= First Light Division, Maryland Volunteers =

1st Light Division
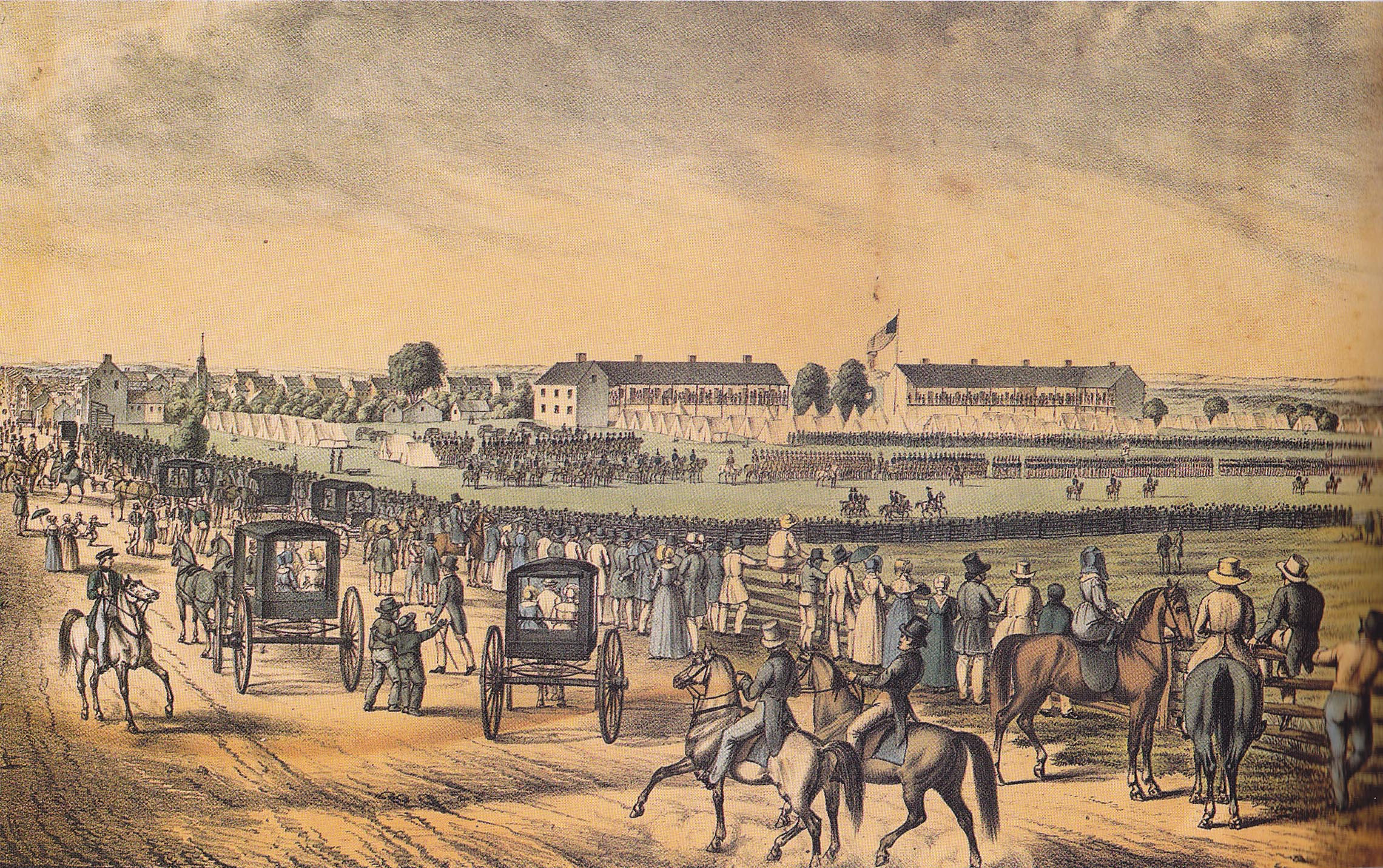
- Major General George H. Steuart reviews the Maryland Militia at Camp Frederick, 1843
- Active: c1841 – 1861
- Country: United States
- Branch: Maryland State Militia
- Type: Division
- Part of: Forces Command
- Garrison/HQ: Baltimore, Maryland
- Engagements: Harper's Ferry

Commanders
- Notable commanders: Major General George H. Steuart

The First Light Division of Maryland Volunteers was a militia unit based in Baltimore and formed in around 1841. Its commander was the militia general George H. Steuart. Elements of the division participated in the suppression of John Brown's raid on Harper's Ferry in 1859, but its members found themselves in a difficult position at the outbreak of the American Civil War in 1861. Many of the citizen volunteers, especially the senior command, wished to secede from the Union and join the Confederate States of America. However, Maryland remained loyal to the Union during the Civil War and as a consequence of this the division was disbanded. Many of its members left Maryland and went south to fight for the Confederacy.

== History ==
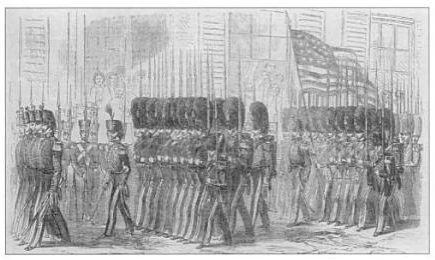
The Baltimore City Guards march through Charleston in 1859, wearing bearskins "taller than the Grenadier Guards".

In 1833 a number of Baltimore regiments were formed into a brigade. The brigade commander was George H. Steuart, who was promoted from colonel to brigadier general. From 1841 to 1861 he was Commander of the First Light Division, Maryland Volunteer Militia. Until the Civil War he would be the Commander-in-Chief of the Maryland Volunteers.

The First Light Division comprised two brigades: the 1st Light Brigade and the 2nd Brigade. The First Brigade consisted of the 1st Cavalry, 1st Artillery, and 5th Infantry regiments. The 2nd Brigade was composed of the 1st Rifle Regiment and the 53rd Infantry Regiment, and the Battalion of Baltimore City Guards.

Each company of citizen volunteers was uniformed, though these differed considerably from unit to unit. The Baltimore City Guard, formed in 1857 under Captain Joseph P. Warner, wore bearskins which were said to be "taller than those of the Grenadier Guards", and "dark blue tailcoats laced with gold, and light blue pants".

The Independent Greys, by contrast, commanded by Captain James O. Law, wore grey tailcoats with black trim, and white pants.

== John Brown and Harper's Ferry ==
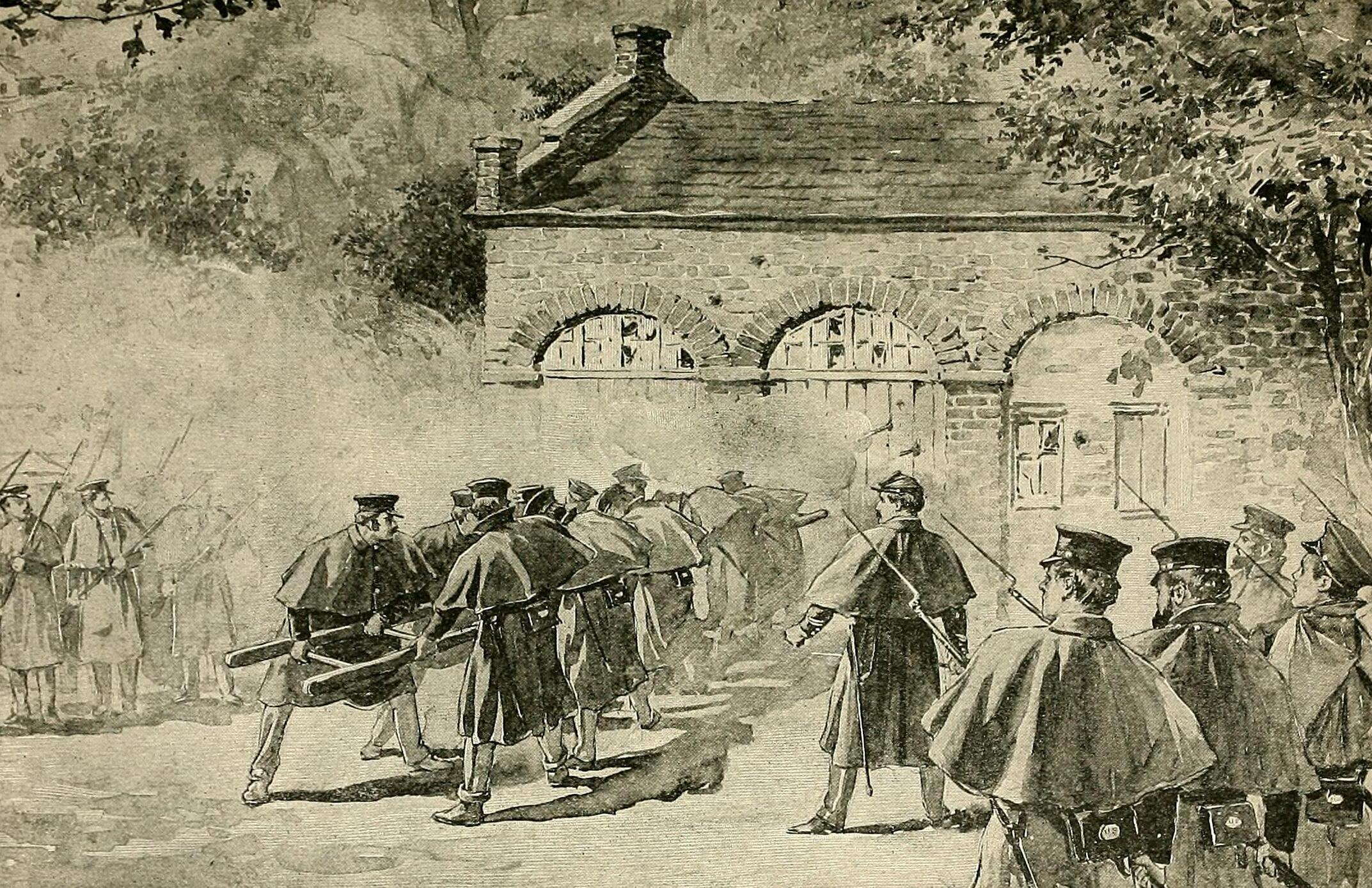
Elements of the First Light Division participated in the suppression of John Brown's raid on Harpers Ferry, 1859.

In 1859 elements of the First Light Division, the City Guards, participated in the suppression of John Brown's raid on Harpers Ferry, an abortive attempt to ignite a slave rebellion. Steuart personally led six companies of Militia: the City Guard, Law Greys and Shields Guard from Baltimore, and the United Guards, Junior Defenders and Independent Riflemen from the city of Frederick.

== Civil War ==
The First Light Division found itself in a difficult position at the outbreak of the American Civil War in 1861. Many of its members, especially the senior command including General Steuart, wished to secede from the Union and join the Confederate States of America. However, Maryland remained within the Union during the Civil War and as a consequence of this the division was disbanded. Many of its members including most of its commanders left Maryland and went south to fight for the Confederacy.

== See also ==
- History of the Maryland Militia in the Civil War
- Maryland Line (CSA)
- 1st Maryland Infantry, CSA
