= 2nd Maryland Infantry Regiment (Confederate) =

Infantry regiment of the Confederate States Army

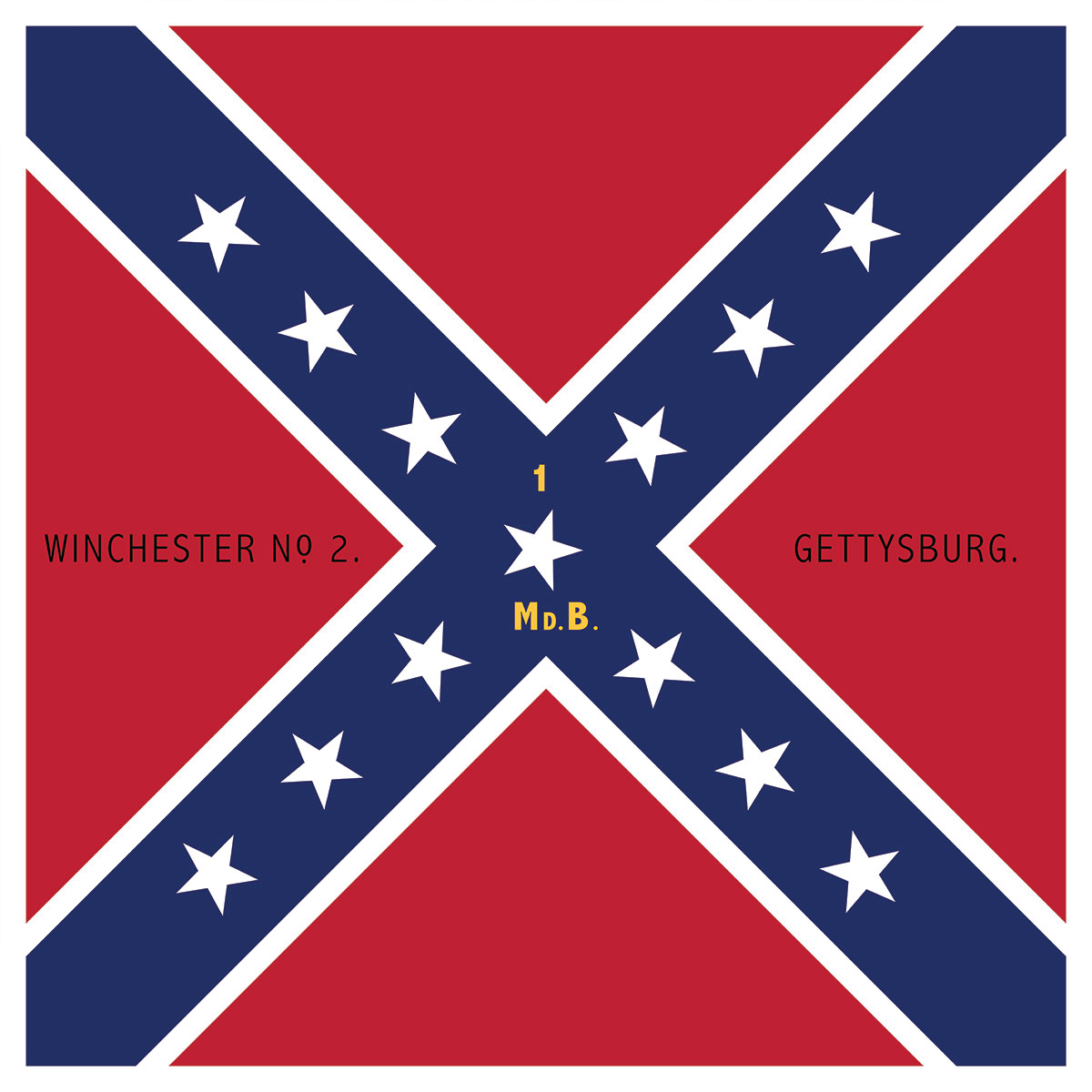
- 2nd Maryland Infantry/1st Maryland Battalion battle flag
- Active: 1862–1865
- Country: Confederate States of America
- Branch: Confederate States Army
- Type: Infantry
- Role: Regiment
- Size: One regiment
- Engagements: Second Battle of Winchester; Battle of Gettysburg; Battle of Cold Harbor; Siege of Petersburg

Commanders
- Ceremonial chief: President of the Confederate States of America

The 2nd Maryland Infantry Regiment (formerly known as the First Maryland Battalion) was a Confederate infantry regiment made up of volunteers from Maryland who, despite their home state remaining loyal to the Union during the American Civil War, chose instead to fight for the Confederacy. The regiment was largely made up of volunteers from the 1st Maryland Infantry, CSA, which was disbanded in August 1862, its initial term of duty having expired. They saw action at many of the fiercest battles of the Civil War, taking part in the brutal fighting at Culp's Hill at the Battle of Gettysburg. The unit suffered such severe casualties during the war that, by the time of General Robert E. Lee's surrender at Appomattox Court House on April 9, 1865, only around forty men remained.

== History ==
=== Disbandment of the 1st Maryland Infantry ===
In August 1862 the 1st Maryland Infantry, CSA was disbanded at Gordonsville, Virginia, at the expiry of its initial twelve-month term of duty. The 1st Maryland Infantry was a regiment of the Confederate army, formed shortly after the commencement of the American Civil War in April 1861. The unit was made up of volunteers from Maryland and saw action at the First Battle of Manassas and in the Shenandoah Valley Campaign. In September 1862 its former commander, Colonel Bradley Tyler Johnson, and many members of his staff offered their services to General Stonewall Jackson.

=== Formation of the 2nd Maryland Infantry ===
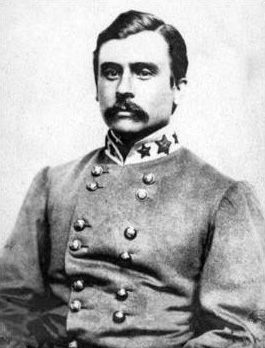
Commander of the 2nd Maryland Infantry, Brig. Gen. George H. "Maryland" Steuart.

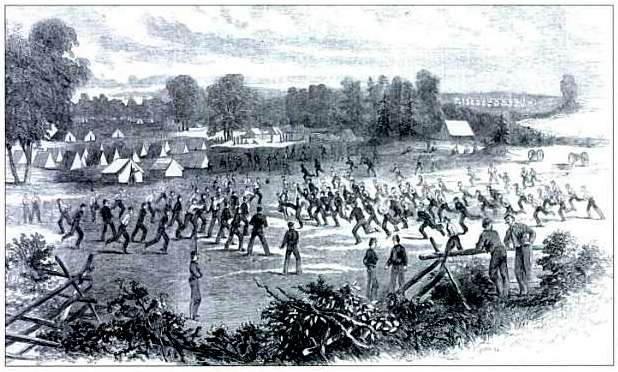
Many 2nd Maryland volunteers had seen service with the 1st Maryland Infantry, CSA, seen here in 1861 playing football at Camp Johnson, near Winchester, Virginia.

After the disbandment of the 1st Maryland Infantry, the rank and file soldiers of the former regiment found themselves in a precarious position. They were unable to return home to Maryland, having effectively committed themselves to the Confederacy for the duration of the war. With little choice but to fight on, many went on to join other units of artillery, or cavalry, while others waited to form a new Maryland Infantry Regiment. The new unit was known as the 1st Maryland Battalion until officially re-designated in January 1864 as the 2nd Maryland Infantry. The change was made in order to distinguish it from the original regiment.

Several former officers of the 1st Maryland, such as Captains William Murray, James Herbert, and lieutenants George Thomas, Clapham Murray and William Zollinger began to recruit veterans for the new regiment, and in addition fresh recruits from Maryland.

Soon, two companies under Captain Murray and Captain J. Parran Crane were formed, followed by three more. By October 1862 more than five hundred men had joined the unit, now a battalion, which was soon assigned to the command of General George Hume "Maryland" Steuart' in Winchester, Virginia. The new battalion held an election in which Captain Herbert was elected to the rank of major. In November the battalion was assigned to the command of General William "Grumble" Jones (so called because of his cantankerous nature), who had taken command of Thomas T. Munford's brigade of cavalry.

Eventually the battalion grew in size, and new elections were held. The commander of the old regiment, Colonel Bradley Tyler Johnson, was duly elected Lieutenant Colonel, but he declined the offer. In the end Major Herbert was elected Lieutenant Colonel, and Captain W. W. Goldsborough, who would later go on to chronicle the history of the Maryland Line in the Civil War, was elected Major.

=== Winter of 1862–63 ===
The regiment spent the harsh winter of 1862–3 in the Shenandoah Valley, without seeing action. Few of the men were equipped with tents, most slept in the open on the frozen ground and, according to Goldsborough, "it was no unusual thing to see several hundred men arise from a covering of a foot of snow that had fallen during the night." In May 1863 the regiment was united with the Baltimore Light Artillery and Company A of the 1st Maryland Cavalry (CSA), as Colonel Johnson, under orders by the Secretary of War, began to organize the various Maryland units under one command, with a view to forming for the first time a true Maryland Line in the Confederate Army.

=== Gettysburg Campaign ===
In early summer of 1863, the 2nd Maryland (then still known as the 1st Maryland Battalion) was assigned to Steuart's Third Brigade, a force of around 2,200 men, in Major General Edward "Allegheny" Johnson's division, part of General Ewell's 2nd Corps in the Army of Northern Virginia. The brigade's former commander, Brigadier General Raleigh Colston, had been relieved of his command by Lee, who was disappointed by his performance at the Battle of Chancellorsville. The brigade consisted of the following regiments: the 1st Maryland, the 1st and 3rd North Carolina, and the 10th, 23rd, and 37th Virginia. Rivalries between the various state regiments had been a recurring problem in the brigade and Lee hoped that Steuart would be able to knit them together effectively. However, he had only been in command for a month when the Gettysburg campaign got under way.

In June 1863 Lee's army advanced north into Maryland, taking the war into Union territory for the second time. The Marylanders were jubilant to be returning to their home state. Steuart is said to have jumped down from his horse, kissed his native soil and stood on his head; according to one of his aides: "We loved Maryland, we felt that she was in bondage against her will, and we burned with desire to have a part in liberating her". Quartermaster John Howard recalled that Steuart performed "seventeen double somersaults" all the while whistling Maryland, My Maryland.

=== 2nd Battle of Winchester ===
In June 1863 the 1st Maryland Battalion saw action at the Second Battle of Winchester fought between June 13 and June 15. On June 13 the Marylanders fought with Federal cavalry and artillery just outside Newtown. On June 14 the 1st Maryland took part in the assault on Winchester, repelling two enemy attacks, and on June 15 the regiment took part in the final attack which led to the capture of Star Fort. Overall Steuart's Third Brigade took around 1,000 prisoners and suffered comparatively small losses of 9 killed, 34 wounded.

=== Battle of Gettysburg ===
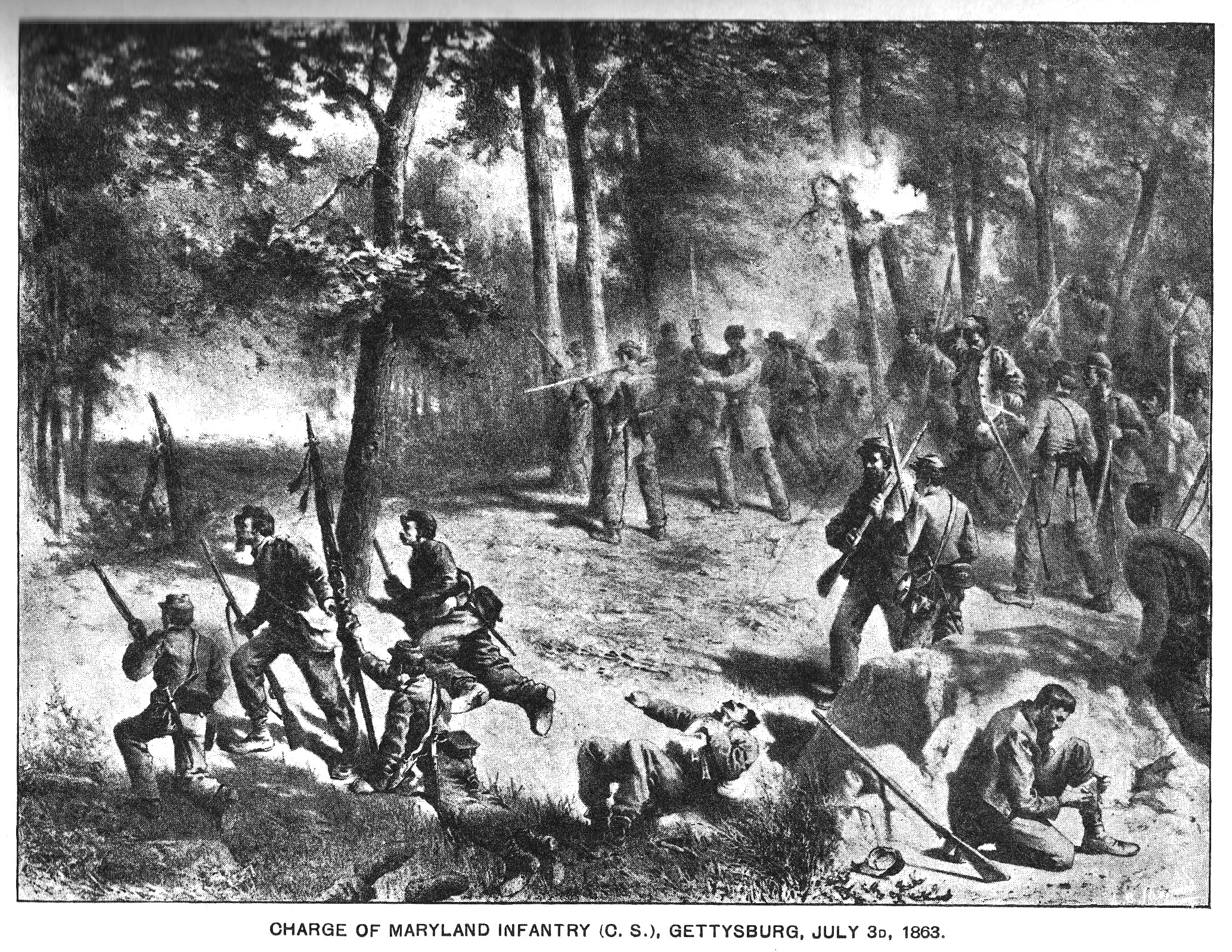
Charge of the 2nd Maryland Infantry, CSA into the "slaughterpen" at Culp's Hill, Battle of Gettysburg, July 3, 1863. So severe were the casualties among the Marylanders that Steuart is said to have broken down and wept, wringing his hands and crying "my poor boys".

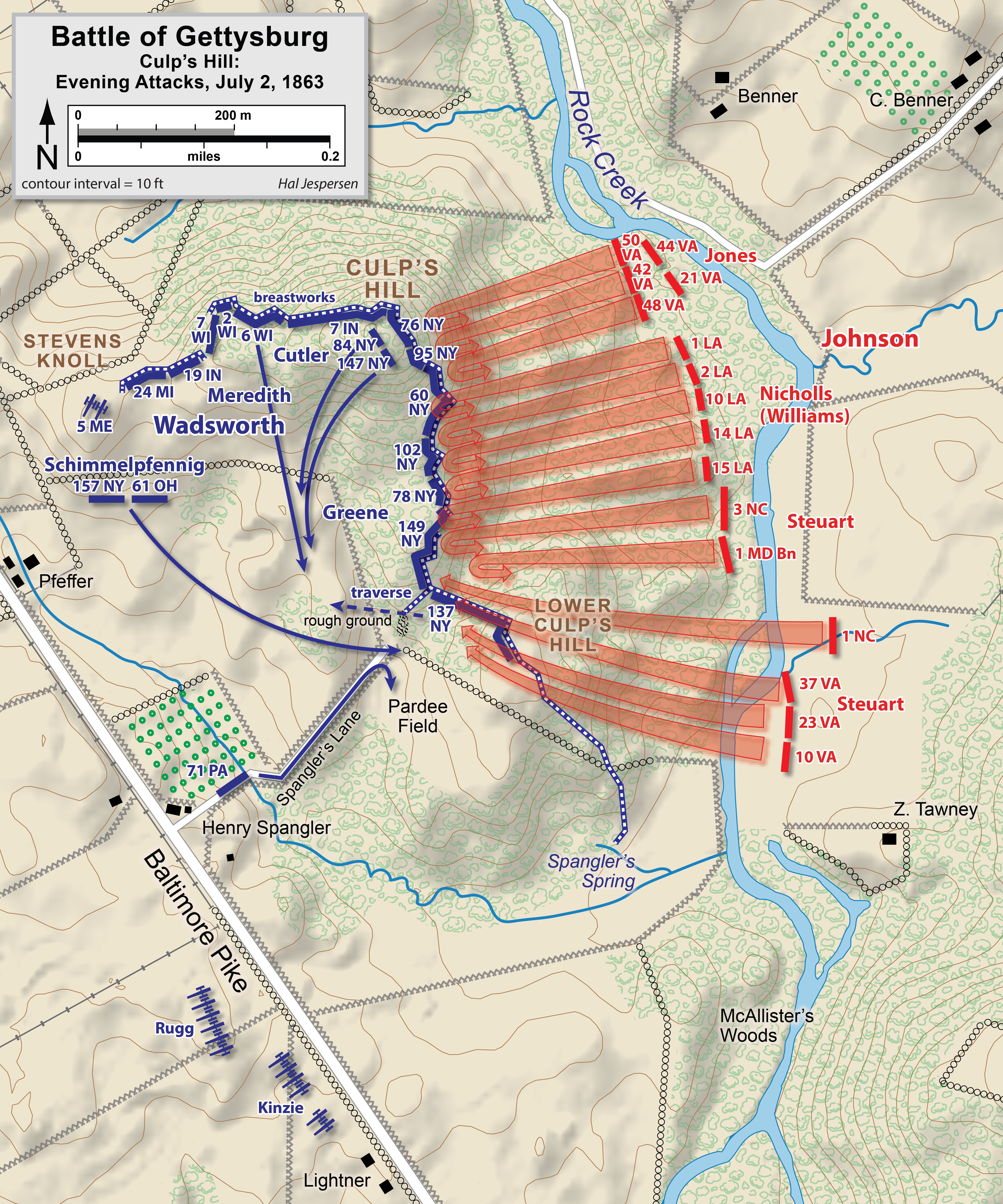
Map showing the attack of Steuart's Marylanders on Lower Culp's Hill at the Battle of Gettysburg.

Johnson's division, including the 1st Maryland, arrived at Gettysburg late in the afternoon on July 1, 1863, taking position on the far edge of the Confederate left at the foot of Culp's Hill; the men were exhausted after a 130-mile forced march. Culp's Hill was a rocky wooded hill topped by a line of well fortified enemy breastworks.

On July 2 the Confederates attacked the hill, with the 1st Maryland, the 10th, 23rd and 37th Virginia regiments, and 3rd North Carolina regiment, all assaulting the Union breastworks, defended by General George S. Greene's 12th Corps. The Marylanders and others were initially able to breach the works and drive out Green's men, and they held their position until the next morning, July 3.

The morning of July 3 revealed the full scale of the Union defenses, as enemy artillery opened fire at a distance of 500 yards with a "terrific and galling fire", followed by a ferocious assault on the Marylander's position. The result was a "terrible slaughter" of the Third Brigade, which fought for many hours without relief, exhausting their ammunition, but successfully holding their position. Then, late on the morning of July 3, General Johnson ordered a bayonet charge against the well-fortified enemy lines. Steuart was appalled, and was strongly critical of the attack, but direct orders could not be disobeyed. The Third Brigade attempted several times to wrest control of Culp's Hill, a vital part of the Union Army defensive line, and the result was a "slaughterpen", as the First Maryland and the Third North Carolina regiments courageously charged a well-defended position strongly held by three brigades, a few reaching within twenty paces of the enemy lines. So severe were the casualties among his men that Steuart is said to have broken down and wept, wringing his hands and crying "my poor boys". Overall, the failed attack on Culp's Hill cost Johnson's division almost 2,000 men, of which 700 were accounted for by Steuart's brigade alone—far more than any other brigade in the division. At Hagerstown, on the 8th July, out of a pre-battle strength of 2,200, just 1,200 men reported for duty. The casualty rate among the First Maryland and Third North Carolina was between one half and two-thirds, in the space of just ten hours.

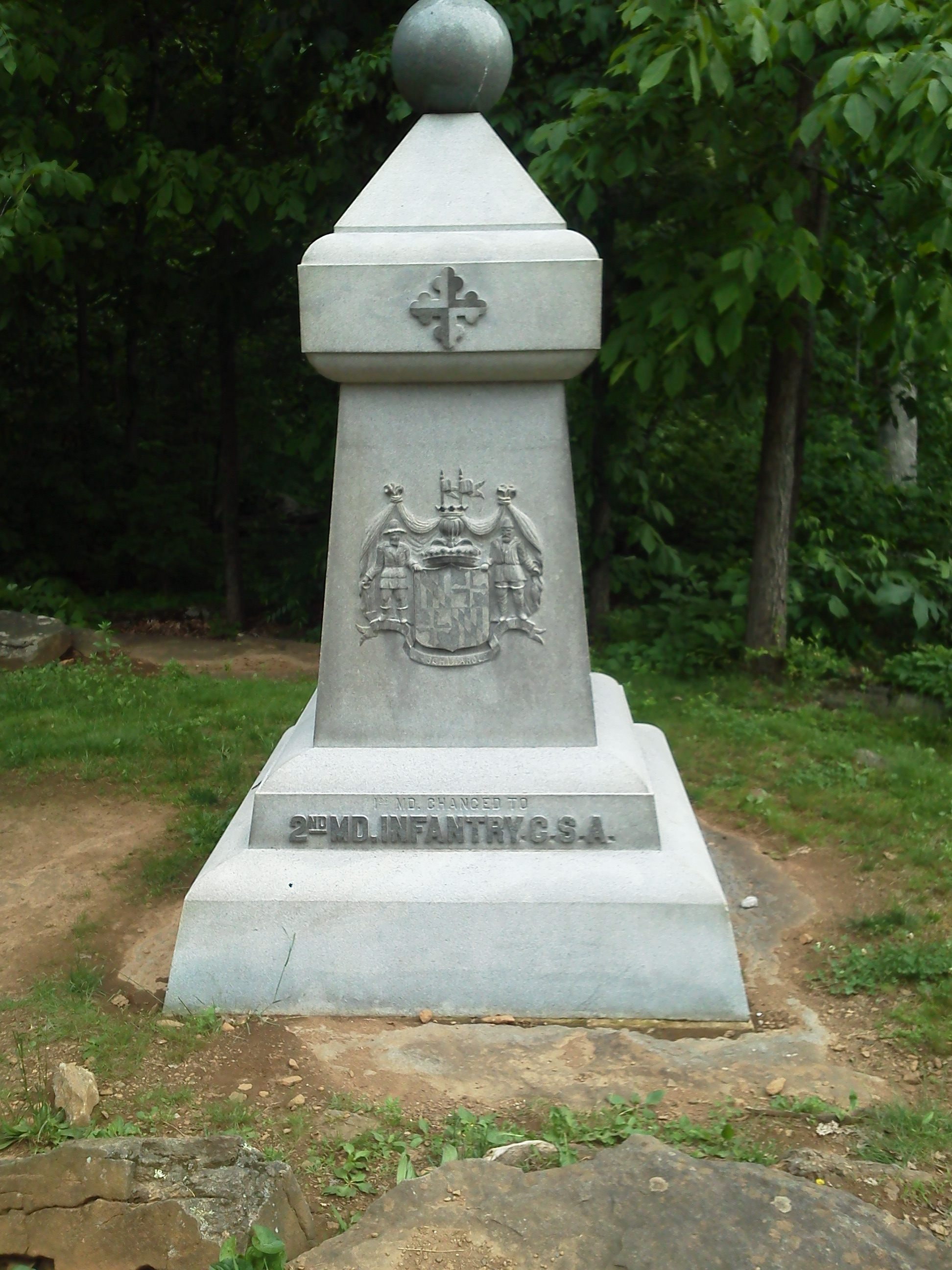
Monument to the regiment at Gettysburg

After Gettysburg, during a review of the Army of Northern Virginia, General Johnson commented to General Robert E. Lee as the Marylanders marched past: "General, they were as steady as that at Gettysburg." Aware of the casualties taken by the Marylanders at the recent battle, Lee honored the regiment, now reduced to battalion strength, by removing his hat to the men.

=== Formation of the Maryland Line ===
On October 22, 1863, the 2nd Maryland Regiment was detached from Steuart's Brigade and assigned to the newly formed Maryland Line, travelling by rail to Hanover Junction, Virginia, where they met the 1st Maryland Cavalry, CSA, the Baltimore Light Artillery, CSA, the 1st Maryland Artillery, CSA, and the 4th Maryland Artillery, CSA. At this time all Marylanders serving in the Army of Northern Virginia were invited to join the newly formed Maryland Line. Few however did so, as the men were by now reluctant to break up units which had already fought together for over two years.

On January 20, 1864, while camped at Hanover Junction, the unit known up to that time as the First Maryland Battalion was official re-designated the Second Maryland Infantry by order of the Confederate Secretary of War.

By May 1864 the 2nd Maryland could muster barely 325 men, and found itself assigned to the command of General John C. Breckinridge, though not attached to any brigade.

=== Battle of Cold Harbor ===
The regiment saw action in June 1864 at the Battle of Cold Harbor, in which General Robert E. Lee's outnumbered men managed to defeat General Ulysses S. Grant's much larger force. On the morning of June 3 the Marylanders were attacked by Federal troops, and mounted a counter-attack. The Marylanders gained the guns of the attacking Union troops and turned them on the Federals, firing canister rounds until "nearly a hundred men were stretched on the plain, from the fire of the Second Maryland Infantry, and many others captured."

After the battle the 2nd Maryland became attached to Frye's Brigade, Heth's Division, Hill's Corps, and on June 13 they took part in the Battle of White Oak Swamp. On June 18 the regiment crossed the James River and went by rail to Petersburg, where they set up defensive breastworks. The Siege of Petersburg was underway, and for the next few months the men lived in their trenches, exchanging occasional fire with the Union attackers.

=== Siege of Petersburg ===
On August 19 a fierce Union assault saw the 2nd Maryland engaged in fierce combat. On August 20, forming a part of General James J. Archers Brigade, it managed to breach the Federal defenses, but the men were unable to hold their position and were thrown back in brutal fighting, by the end of which almost a third of the regiment were dead, wounded or captured. During the Battle of Peebles' Farm the regiment would lose a further 53 men dead and wounded. By this time they had ceased to exist as an effective fighting force.

=== 1865 and surrender ===
On February 5, 1865, what remained of the regiment saw further fighting at the Battle of Hatcher's Run, after which the unit effectively fell apart. By the time of General Robert E. Lee's surrender at Appomattox Court House on April 9, only around forty men were present to surrender to the Union army.

== See also ==
- History of the Maryland Militia in the Civil War
- Maryland in the American Civil War
- Maryland Civil War Confederate units
- Maryland Line (CSA)
