= List of Confederate units from Maryland in the American Civil War =

"Crossland Banner", unofficial flag used by Maryland secessionists.

This is a list of Confederate units from Maryland in the American Civil War. The list of Maryland Union Civil War units is shown separately.

== Infantry ==
- 1st Infantry
- 2nd Infantry
- Weston's Battalion

== Cavalry ==
- 1st Cavalry
- 2nd Battalion, Cavalry (a.k.a. Gilmor's Partisan Rangers)
- Davis's Battalion, Cavalry

== Artillery ==
- 1st Artillery (Dement's)
- 2nd Artillery (Baltimore Light Artillery)
- 3rd Artillery (Ritter's)
- 4th (Chesapeake) Artillery

== Maryland units serving in other state's regiments ==
- Zarvona's Zouaves - 47th Virginia Infantry
- Maryland Guard, Co. B, 21st Virginia Infantry
- Maryland Guerilla Zouaves, 2nd Co. C, Nelligan's Louisiana Infantry
- The Lanier Guard, Company G, 13th Virginia Infantry
- Company D, 54th Virginia Infantry
- Howard Dragoons, 1st Company B, 7th Virginia Cavalry
- Mason Rangers, Company G, 7th Virginia Cavalry
- Chiswell's Maryland Exiles, Company B, 35th Battalion Virginia Cavalry
- 1st Stuart's Horse Artillery (John Pelham Battery), Virginia Horse Artillery

== See also ==
- Lists of American Civil War Regiments by State
- Confederate Units by State
- Maryland Line (CSA)
