= Arnold Elzey =

Confederate Army general (1816-1871)

Arnold Elzey Jones Jr.
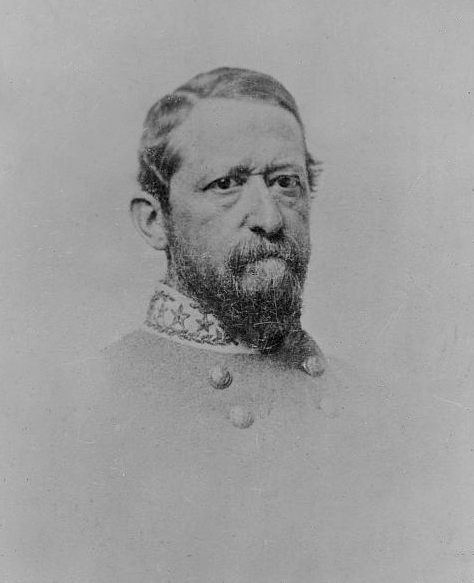
- Born: December 18, 1816; Somerset County, Maryland, U.S.
- Died: February 21, 1871 (aged 54); Baltimore, Maryland, U.S.
- Military career
- Allegiance: United States; Confederate States
- Branch: United States Army; Confederate Army
- Service years: 1837–1861 (USA); 1861–1865 (CSA)
- Rank: Captain (USA); Major General (CSA)
- Conflicts: Seminole Wars; Mexican-American War; Battle of Contreras; Battle of Churubusco; Siege of Vera Cruz; Battle of Cerro Gordo; Battle of Molino del Rey; Battle of Chapultepec; Battle for Mexico City; American Civil War; First Battle of Manassas; Valley Campaign; Battle of Cross Keys (WIA); Battle of Gaines Mill (WIA); Battle of Chancellorsville; Battle of Lynchburg

Arnold Elzey Jones Jr. (December 18, 1816 – February 21, 1871), known for much of his life simply as Arnold Elzey, was a soldier in both the United States Army and the Confederate Army, serving as a major general in the American Civil War. At First Manassas, he became one of the few officers ever to receive an on-the-field promotion to general by President Jefferson Davis. He commanded a brigade in Stonewall Jackson's Valley Campaign, and was badly wounded at Gaines Mill, ending his active field career.

== Early life and career ==
Jones was born on the "Elmwood" plantation along the Manokin River in Somerset County, Maryland. His parents were Colonel Arnold Elzey Jones and Anne Wilson (née Jackson) Jones. He graduated from the United States Military Academy 33rd in the Class of 1837. After turning twenty-eight, he dropped Jones from his name and officially adopted Elzey as his surname to grant a wish of his father, going for the rest of his life simply as Arnold Elzey.

He was assigned to the 2nd U.S. Artillery and sent to Florida to fight in the Second Seminole War before being assigned to duty at Detroit, Michigan, during a series of territorial disputes between the U.S. and Canada. Promoted to first lieutenant in November 1839, he spent the next few years on recruiting duty.

During the Mexican-American War, he was cited for bravery during the battles of Contreras and Churubusco. He was granted a brevet promotion to captain. He also participated in engagements at Fort Brown, Vera Cruz, Cerro Gordo, Molino del Rey, Chapultepec, and the capture of the City of Mexico.

Following the war, Elzey was formally promoted to the full rank of captain on February 14, 1849. He served in Florida a second time during the Third Seminole War in 1849–50, and again in 1856. He also commanded Augusta Arsenal.

== Civil War ==
Following the secession of several Southern states and the formation of the Confederate States of America, Elzey surrendered Augusta Arsenal to the Confederates in January 1861 and took his men to Washington, D.C., in early April 1861. He resigned his commission on April 25, 1861, and traveled to Richmond, Virginia, where he joined the Confederate army with the initial rank of colonel of the newly formed 1st Maryland Infantry, CSA.

He was assigned to the brigade of Brigadier General Edmund Kirby Smith and fought in the First Battle of Manassas. When Smith was wounded during the afternoon, Elzey, as the senior colonel, assumed command and led a successful charge, for which he received the thanks of commanding general P.G.T. Beauregard. He was promoted on the field to brigadier general by Jefferson Davis.

In 1862, the following year, Elzey commanded a brigade under Richard S. Ewell during Stonewall Jackson's Valley Campaign. He was wounded in the leg and had his horse shot from under him at the Battle of Cross Keys.

Elzey was shot through the head at the Battle of Gaines Mill, a serious wound that kept him from active field command for the rest of the war. After he had recovered sufficiently to perform administrative and desk duty, he was promoted to major general dating from December 4, 1862. He was assigned command of the Department of Richmond and charged with the defense of the Confederacy's capital city. He dealt with a raid by George Stoneman's Union cavalry during the Chancellorsville Campaign, as well as Union gunboats that summer that threatened Richmond from the James River. Later relieved of command, he raised the Local Defense Brigade, a militia group consisting primarily of government clerks. He also helped organize the Virginia state reserves.

In June 1864, Elzey left Richmond to join General Jubal Early's force defending Lynchburg, Virginia. He arrived on June 18, and briefly took command of General John C. Breckinridge's division for the last day of the Battle of Lynchburg and the following pursuit of General David Hunter's army as it withdrew westwardly into the mountains of West Virginia.

Elzey was assigned as the Chief of Artillery for the Army of Tennessee and traveled to Georgia to serve under John Bell Hood. However, he missed Hood's disastrous Franklin-Nashville Campaign. With Hood's army essentially wrecked, Elzey was relieved of duty on February 17, 1865, and then assumed command of militia at Augusta, Georgia. Following the collapse of the Confederacy, he was paroled in Washington, Georgia, in May 1865.

== Postbellum activities ==
After the war, Elzey returned to his native Maryland and retired with his wife and son to a small farm near Jessup's Cut, Anne Arundel County, Maryland. He died in Baltimore and was buried there in Green Mount Cemetery.

== Legacy ==
The Maj. Gen. Arnold Elzey Camp #1940 of the Sons of Confederate Veterans was named in his honor.

== See also ==
- Maryland in the American Civil War
- List of American Civil War generals (Confederate)
