= Bradley Tyler Johnson =

Confederate Army general (1829–1903)

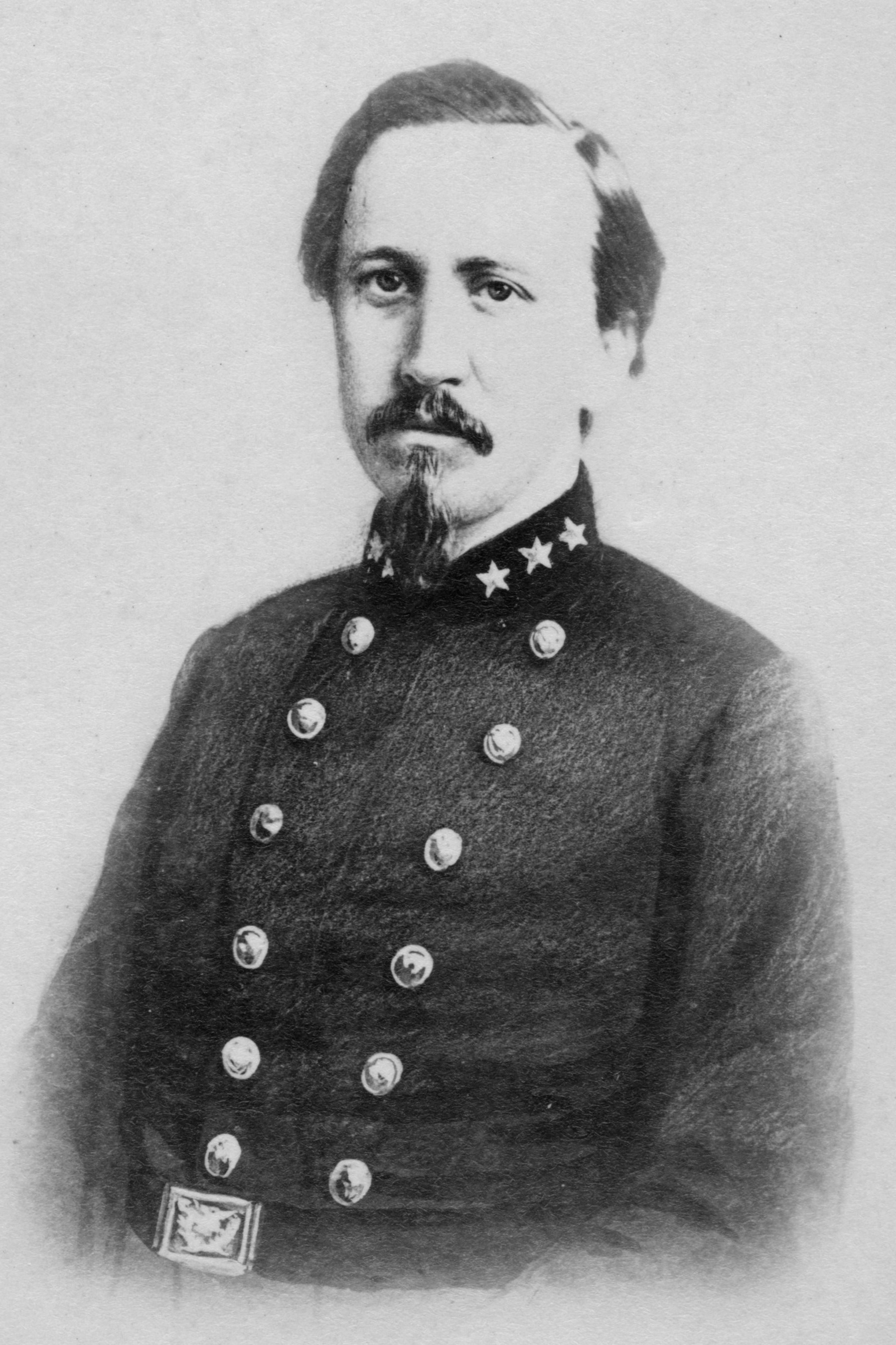

Member of the Virginia Senate from the Virginia's 7th Senate district district
- In office 1875–1877

Personal details
- Born: September 29, 1829 Frederick City, Maryland, US
- Died: October 5, 1903 (aged 74) Amelia, Virginia, US
- Resting place: Loudon Park Cemetery
- Party: Democratic
- Occupation: Lawyer

Military service
- Allegiance: Confederate States
- Branch/service: Confederate States Army
- Rank: Brigadier General
- Commands: 1st Maryland Infantry
- Battles/wars: American Civil War Battle of Front Royal First Battle of Winchester Battle of Cross Keys Peninsula Campaign

Bradley Tyler Johnson (September 29, 1829 – October 5, 1903) was an American lawyer, soldier, and writer. Although his home state of Maryland remained in the Union during the American Civil War, it was still considered a Southern state and Confederate sympathies were common, and Johnson served as a brigadier general in the Confederate States Army, leading efforts to raise a Maryland Line in the CSA, and rising to command the 1st Maryland Infantry, CSA.

== Early life ==
Johnson was born in Frederick City, Maryland, a son of Charles Worthington Johnson and Eleanor Murdock Tyler. He graduated from Princeton in 1849, read law with William Ross of Frederick, and finished his legal degree at Harvard. He was admitted to the bar in 1851.

On June 23, 1851, he married Jane Claudia Saunders of North Carolina (a daughter of Hon. Romulus Mitchell Saunders and granddaughter of Judge William Johnson). Their son, Bradley Saunders Johnson was born on February 14, 1856.

Johnson was a delegate to the National Democratic Convention at Baltimore in 1860 and joined the majority of his delegation when they withdrew from the convention and united with the Southern wing of the party, which supported Breckinridge and Lane.

== Civil War ==
When the Civil War began, Johnson organized and equipped a company at his own expense, and he took an active part in forming the 1st Maryland Infantry, CSA, of which he became major and subsequently colonel, meanwhile declining a lieutenant colonel's commission in a Virginia regiment because of his belief that his strongest obligation was to his own state.

By early May 1861 around 500 Marylanders had begun to assemble at Harper's Ferry, Virginia, under Johnson's command, forming 8 companies of Maryland infantry. Johnson preferred not to join the newly forming Virginia regiments, arguing that Marylanders should fight under their own flag. However, other former members of the Maryland militia did not agree; many members of the elite Maryland Guard and Independent Greys from Baltimore went to Richmond, where they were mustered into the service of Virginia.

=== Mutiny and the Battle of Front Royal ===
On May 17, 1862, the initial 12-month term of duty of C Company, 1st Maryland Regiment, expired, and the men began to clamor for their immediate discharge. By this time the regimental commander George H. Steuart had been promoted brigadier general, assigned with the task of forming the Maryland Line, and Johnson had been promoted to colonel and succeeded to command of the regiment. Johnson reluctantly agreed with the men, but he could not disband the entire regiment in mid-campaign, and discontent began to spread. By May 22, on the eve of the Battle of Front Royal, discontent became open mutiny. Steuart and Johnson argued with the men to no avail, though news of the rebellion was kept secret from General Jackson. When given orders to engage the enemy, Johnson addressed his soldiers:

You have heard the order, and I must confess are in a pretty condition to obey it. I will have to return it with the endorsement upon the back that "the First Maryland refuses to meet the enemy", despite being given orders by General Jackson. Before this day I was proud to call myself a Marylander, but now, God knows, I would rather be known as anything else. Shame on you to bring this stigma upon the fair name of your native state - to cause the finger of scorn to be pointed at those who confided to your keeping their most sacred trust - their honor and that of the glorious Old State. Marylanders you call yourselves - profane not that hallowed name again, for it is not yours. What Marylander ever before threw down his arms and deserted his colors in the presence of the enemy, and those arms, and those colors too, placed in your hands by a woman? Never before has one single blot defaced her honored history. Could it be possible to conceive a crime more atrocious, an outrage more damnable? Go home and publish to the world your infamy. Boast of it when you meet your fathers and mothers, brothers, sisters and sweethearts. Tell them it was you who, when brought face to face with the enemy, proved yourselves recreants, and acknowledged yourselves to be cowards. Tell them this, and see if you are not spurned from their presence like some loathsome leper, and despised, detested, nay abhorred, by those whose confidence you have so shamefully betrayed; you will wander over the face of the earth with the brand of 'coward', 'traitor', indelibly imprinted on your foreheads, and in the end sink into a dishonored grave, unwept for, uncared for, leaving behind as a heritage to your posterity the scorn and contempt of every honest man and virtuous woman in the land.

Johnson's speech seems to have worked where threats had failed, and the Marylanders rallied to the regimental colors, seizing their weapons and crying "lead us to the enemy and we will prove to you that we are not cowards"

At the Battle of Front Royal, May 23, 1862, the 1st Maryland (CSA) was forced into battle with their fellow Marylanders, the 1st Regiment Maryland Volunteer Infantry (USA) commanded by Colonel Kenly. This is the only time in United States military history that two regiments of the same numerical designation and from the same state have engaged each other in battle.

=== Battle of Winchester ===
Just two days later, on May 25, 1862, the 1st Maryland fought again at the First Battle of Winchester, and at the Battle of Cross Keys on June 8, where the 1st Maryland were placed on General Ewell's left, successfully fighting off three assaults by Federal troops.

After the Confederate victory at the First Battle of Winchester, Johnson, who was described by J. J. Goldsborough as "one of the handsomest men in the First Maryland", was the recipient of some not entirely welcome female attention. According to Goldsborough:

having dismounted from his horse in an unguarded moment, [he] was espied and singled out by an old lady of Amazonian proportions, just from the wash tub, who, wiping her hands and mouth on her apron as she approached, seized him around the neck with the hug of a bruin, and bestowed upon him half a dozen kisses that were heard by nearly every man in the command, and when at length she relaxed her hold the Colonel looked as if he had just come out a vapor bath.

=== Peninsular Campaign ===
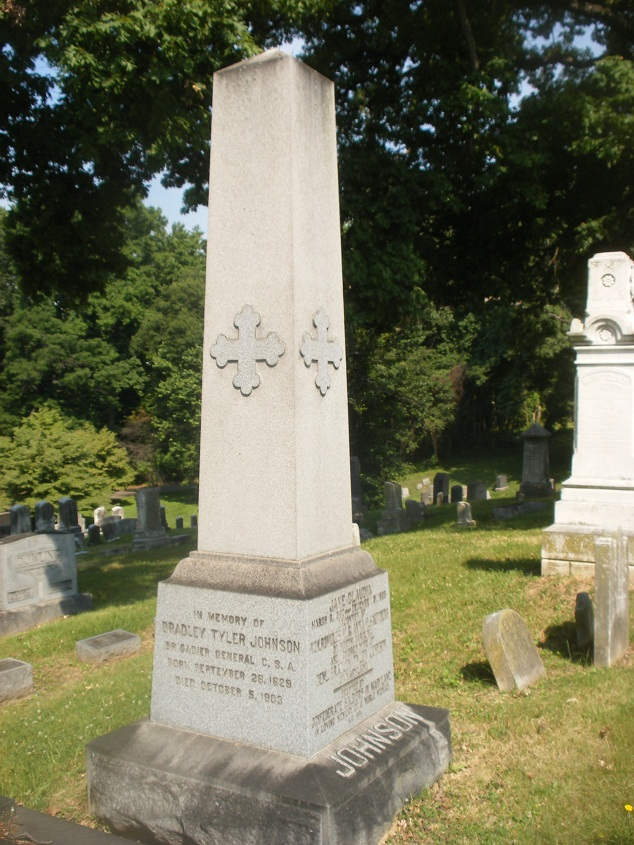
Grave monument, Loudon Park Cemetery, Baltimore, Maryland

Johnson saw service in the Seven Days Battles in 1862, part of the Peninsula Campaign, a series of six major battles over the seven days from June 25 to July 1, 1862, near Richmond, Virginia, in which Confederate General Robert E. Lee drove the invading Union Army of the Potomac, commanded by Maj. Gen. George B. McClellan, away from Richmond and into a retreat down the Virginia Peninsula.

Johnson's 1st Maryland Infantry regiment was mustered out at Richmond, on August 17, 1862, at the end of its term of service. The Maryland men immediately began re-organizing into the 1st Maryland Infantry Battalion.

In the meantime, the Northern Virginia Campaign had begun. Following Battle of Cedar Mountain, Johnson succeeded T.S. Garnett as commander of the Second Brigade in the Stonewall Division. The Second Brigade had fought under John R. Jones during the Seven Days Battles prior to that officer being wounded. Johnson led the Second Brigade at the Second Battle of Manassas. John R. Jones returned and reassumed command of the Second Brigade for the subsequent Maryland Campaign, and Johnson returned to Richmond to sit on the Confederate military court for court-martials for 1862–1863.

Johnson was advanced to the rank of brigadier general of cavalry in 1864.

As commander of the post at Salisbury, N.C., he used his influence to lessen the suffering among the prisoners of war and finally obtained their parole.

== Postbellum career ==
In 1875, Johnson and William Elam Tanner successfully ran as Democrats for the Virginia State Senate. Johnson initially maintained support from African Americans. "Johnson clubs" were political organizations of African-American voters. Johnson quickly lost their support. William Carter Knight and Patrick Henry Starke declared their run for the Virginia Senate on the Sunday before election day. They ran as Independents and declared an aggressive fight for civil rights. All African-Americans quickly abandoned the Democratic candidate for Knight and Starke. In one precinct, eighty-five Johnson supporters switched to Knight and Starke. After the war, Johnson practiced law in Richmond until 1879, when he moved to Baltimore. After the death of his wife, he moved to Amelia, Virginia, where he died, but his remains were interred back in Baltimore in Loudon Park Cemetery.

== Selected works ==
- Reports of Chase's Decisions on the Fourth Circuit (1875)
- Memoir of Joseph E. Johnston (1891)
- Foundation of Maryland and the Maryland Act Concerning Religion (1883)
- Life of General Washington, in "Great Commanders Series" (1894)
- Maryland in Confederate Military History (Atlanta, 1899)

== See also ==
- List of American Civil War Generals (Confederate)
- Johnny Poe
