= Washington Blues =

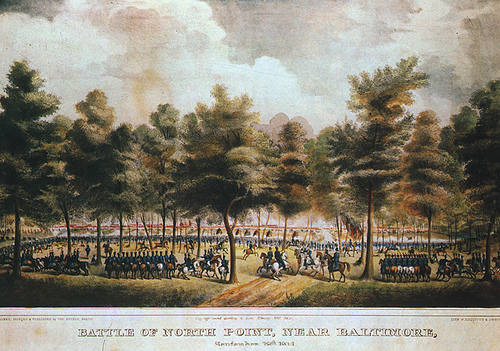
- The Battle of North Point, painted by Thomas Ruckle, a corporal and amateur artist who served in George H. Steuart's company, the Washington Blues, Maryland Militia
- Active: 1814
- Country: United States
- Allegiance: Maryland
- Branch: Maryland Militia
- Type: volunteers
- Size: company
- Part of: Maryland Line
- Engagements: War of 1812: Battle of Bladensburg; Battle of North Point

Commanders
- Current commander: Captain George H. Steuart
- Notable commanders: Lieutenant Colonel Joseph Sterett Captain George H. Steuart

The Washington Blues were a company of Maryland Volunteers which saw action during the Battle of Bladensburg and the Battle of North Point, during the War of 1812.

== History ==
When war broke out between the United States and Great Britain, George H. Steuart (then Captain Steuart) raised a company of Maryland volunteers, known as the Washington Blues, part of the 5th Maryland Regiment commanded by Lieutenant Colonel Joseph Sterett. They saw action at the Battle of Bladensberg (August 24, 1814), where the Americans, including the 5th Regiment, were routed by the British. Although the 5th had "evinced a disposition to make a gallant resistance", it was flanked by the redcoats and forced to retreat in some disorder. After the battle, British forces entered Washington, D.C. and burned several government buildings.

Steuart's company fought better at the Battle of North Point (September 12, 1814), where the militia were able to hold the line for several hours before making a fighting retreat, and where Steuart was wounded. Some of the militia regiments, such as the 51st, and some members of 39th, broke and ran under fire, but the 5th and 27th held their ground and were able to retreat in reasonably good order having inflicted significant casualties on the advancing enemy. Corporal John McHenry of the 5th Regiment wrote an account of the battle:

Our Regiment, the 5th, carried off the praise from the other regiments engaged, so did the company to which I have the honor to belong cover itself with glory. When compared to the [other] Regiments we were the last that left the ground...had our Regiment not retreated at the time it did we should have been cut off in two minutes.

== Notable members ==
- Corporal Thomas Ruckle was among those who volunteered for the Washington Blues. Ruckle was a sign painter and glazier, and also an amateur painter. Ruckle's paintings The Battle of North Point, and The Defense of Baltimore were painted shortly after the events they describe, and are now in the collection of the Maryland Historical Society.
- Captain George H. Steuart would later become Major General of the Maryland Militia, and its senior commander. From 1841 to 1861 he was Commander of the First Light Division, Maryland Volunteer Militia.

On April 19, 1861, during the start of the American Civil War, Baltimore was disrupted by riots, during which Southern sympathizers attacked Union troops passing through the city by rail. Steuart himself was strongly sympathetic to the Confederacy and, perhaps knowing this, Governor Hicks did not call out the militia to suppress the riots. On May 13, 1861 Union troops occupied the state, restoring order and preventing a vote in favor of Southern secession. Steuart moved south for the duration of the Civil War, and much of the general's property was confiscated by the Federal Government as a consequence. However, many members of the newly formed Maryland Line in the Confederate army would be drawn from Steuart's militia.
