= Sterett =

Sterett is a surname. Notable people with the surname include:

- Andrew Sterett (1787–1807), United States Navy officer
- Joseph Sterett (1773–1821), Maryland militia officer
- Samuel Sterett (1758–1833), American politician

== See also ==
- Sterrett, a surname
- Sterritt, a surname
