= 175th Infantry Regiment (United States) =

- 175th Infantry Regiment coat of arms
- Active: 1774 – present
- Country: United States
- Branch: United States Army
- Type: Infantry
- Part of: 2nd Infantry Brigade Combat Team, 28th Infantry Division
- Garrison/HQ: Dundalk, Maryland – 1st Bn.
- Nickname: "Fifth Maryland" (special designation)
- Mottos: Decus et Praesidium (An Honour and a Guard)
- Anniversaries: 3 Dec. 1774 (Regimental Day)
- Engagements: Revolutionary War; Long Island; Trenton; Princeton; Brandywine; Germantown; Monmouth; Battle of Cowpens; Guilford Courthouse; Yorktown campaign; Siege of Yorktown; Saratoga campaign; Battles of Saratoga; Battle of Camden; Battle of Guilford Court House; Battle of the Combahee River; War of 1812; Battle of Bladensburg; Battle of Baltimore; Battle of North Point; American Civil War; First Battle of Bull Run; Peninsula Campaign; Jackson's Valley Campaign; Battle of Gettysburg; Cold Harbor; Siege of Petersburg; Appomattox Campaign; World War I; Meuse-Argonne Offensive; World War II; Invasion of Normandy; Rhineland Offensive; War on terror; Iraq War; Multinational Force and Observers

Commanders
- Current commander: LTC Joseph Mucci (1st BN)
- Notable commanders: Mordecai Gist William Smallwood; John Stricker; Milton Reckord Edward H. McDaniel

Insignia
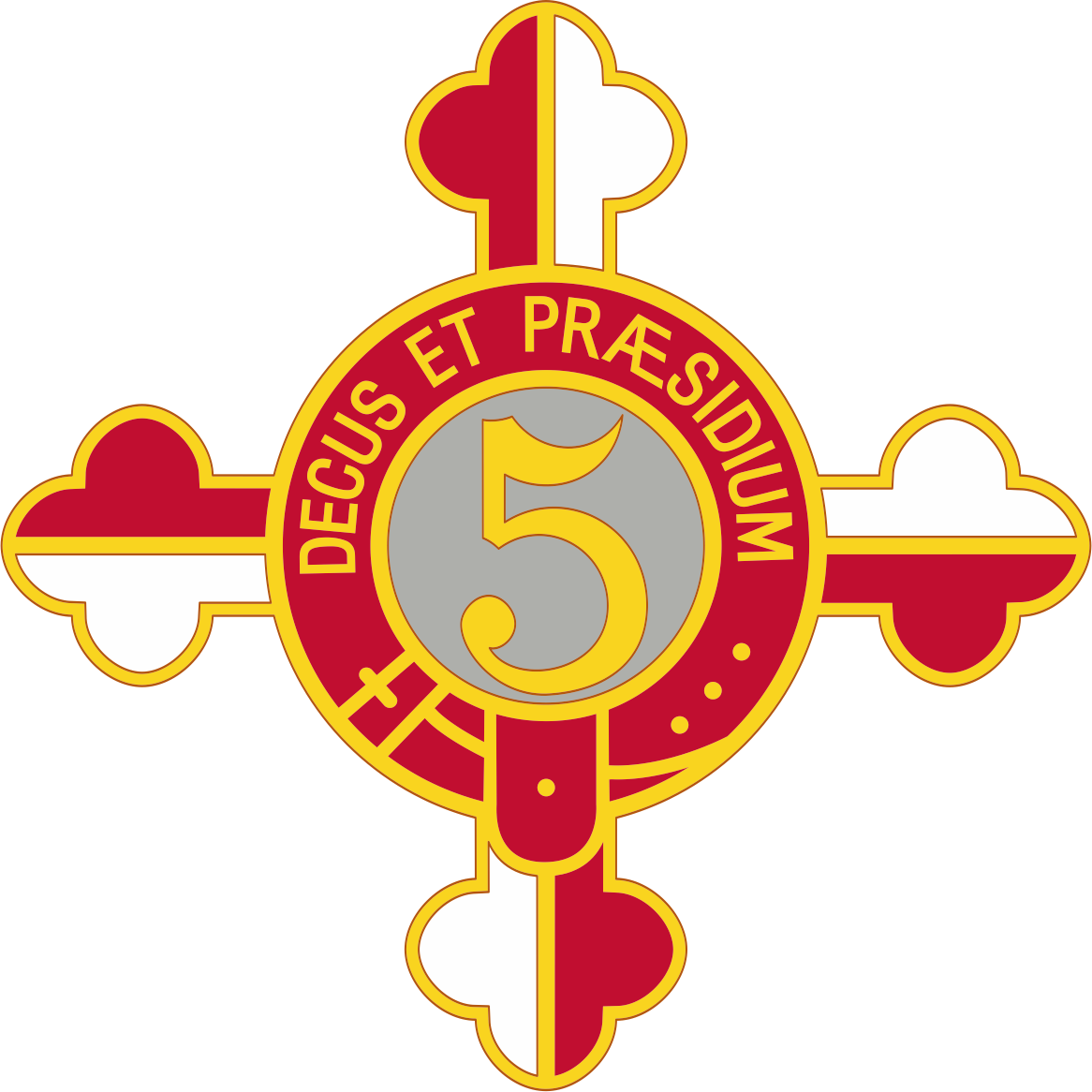
- Distinctive unit insignia

The 175th Infantry Regiment ("Fifth Maryland") is an infantry regiment of the Maryland Army National Guard. It is one of several National Guard units with colonial roots and campaign credit for the War of 1812. Formed in 1774, it is the fifth-oldest National Guard regiment in the Army. Its active 1st Battalion is stationed at the Dundalk Readiness Center on the 1814 Battle of North Point battlefield, making it one of fewer than six units in the military garrisoned on ground where its predecessors fought. With 22 authorized campaign streamers spanning from the Revolutionary War through the Global War on Terrorism, the 175th ranks 3rd among all National Guard infantry regiments for total battle honors.

== History ==
Mordecai Gist, a young Baltimore merchant, organized a militia company on 3 December 1774. This company was the nucleus of Baltimore's Fifth Regiment which—expanded, modified, and undergoing occasional changes in designation—has enjoyed an uninterrupted history down to the present 175th Infantry (Fifth Maryland), Maryland Army National Guard. The unit is the seventh oldest regiment in the United States.

=== Revolutionary War ===
By 1774 the people of Maryland had become thoroughly aroused over the troubles around Boston, especially the blockading of the port as the consequence of the "Boston Tea Party." Their reaction to the British actions in October 1774 was to burn tea, and the brig Peggy Stewart in which the tea had arrived, during daylight in Annapolis Harbor. Hostilities having begun, an assembly of delegates from the various counties met in Annapolis in November to discuss measures for armed resistance and to adopt resolutions for defense.

In this tense atmosphere, Mordecai Gist of Baltimore organized a company of militia, which assumed the title "The Baltimore Independent Cadets." On 3 December 1774, 58 young men of the town signed an agreement to "form ourselves into a body or company in order to learn the military discipline," and each agreed to provide himself with a uniform consisting of "a coat turnd up with Buff, and trimd with Yellow Mettal, or Gold Buttons, White Stockings & black Cloth half Boots," and to equip himself with arms and ammunition. And so was organized the first uniformed military company in Maryland, the parent from which the Fifth Regiment sprung in the early days of the war just two years later.

The battles of Lexington, Concord, and Bunker Hill were fought in Massachusetts during the spring of 1775. On 1 January 1776, the Maryland Assembly voted to organize and send its first regiment of soldiers to the Continental Army. This consisted of nine companies, the eighth of which was Gist's "Independent Cadets." Gist became Major in the new regiment and the command of the company passed to Samuel Smith, later to become major general, Mayor of Baltimore, and United States Senator from Maryland. Thus organized, Smallwood's Regiment, so-called after its commander Colonel William Smallwood, left on 10 July 1776 to join General Washington's army. It marched to Philadelphia, and from there was promptly dispatched by John Hancock, President of the Congress, to the "Flying Camp" of the army before New York.

On 27 August 1776 the Continentals fought a large British Army force. Smallwood's men, led by Major Gist, lost nearly half of their number at the Battle of Long Island in an attempt to halt the British advance. The British, under General Howe, flanked the American positions, and General Washington ordered a withdrawal to the mainland. In order to allow the army to escape capture, Smallwood's men were ordered to attack the British forces and hold them long enough to give the American army time to withdraw across Long Island Sound.

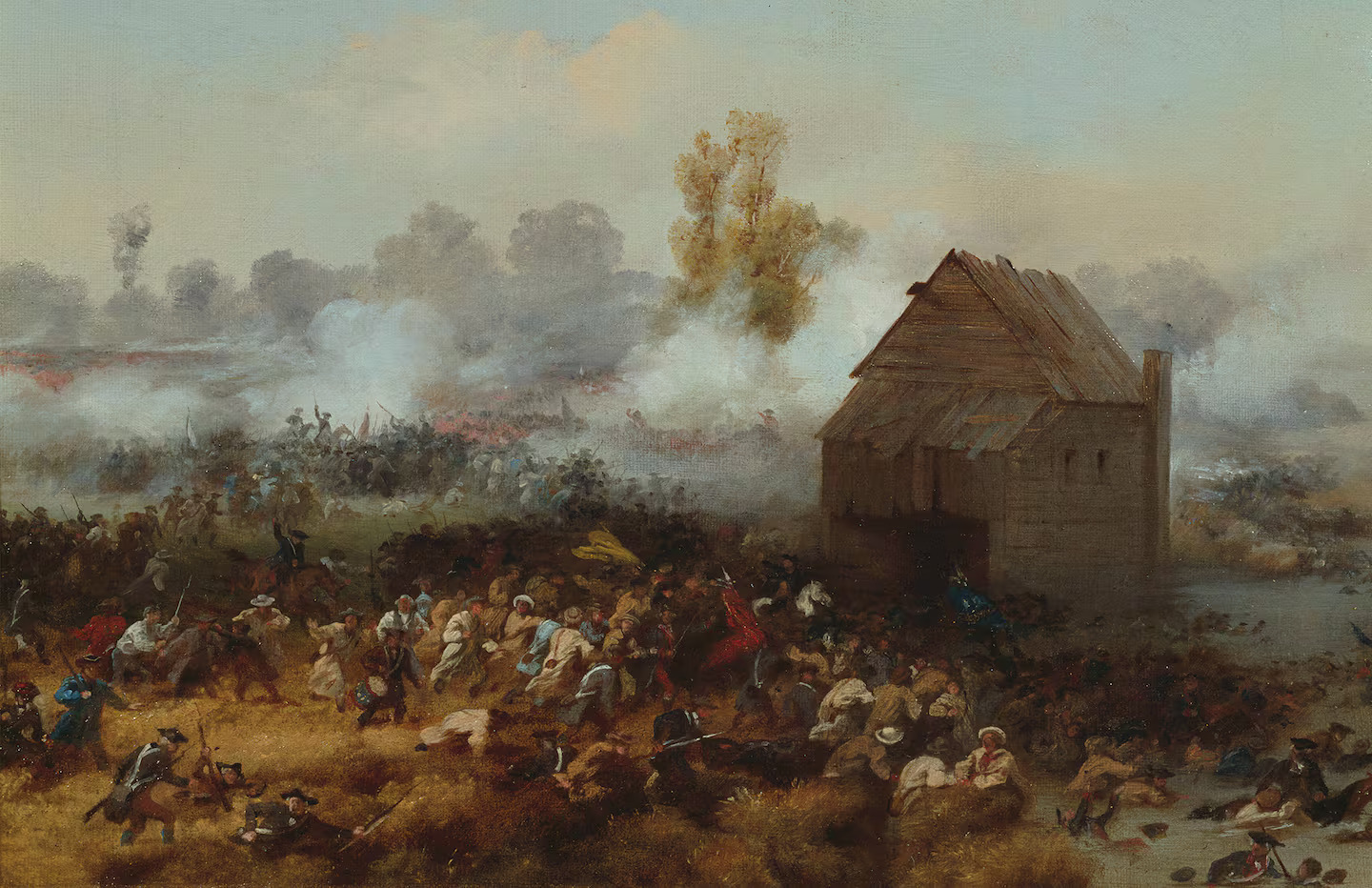
Lord Stirling leading an attack against the British in order to enable the retreat of other troops at the Battle of Long Island, 1776. Painting by Alonzo Chappel, 1858.

During the following weeks, the regiment fought at Harlem Heights, Fort Washington, and White Plains. Several times during these engagements the Marylanders performed missions at the particular direction of General Washington. At this time, on 1 December 1776, enlistments, which the Congress had authorized only to that date, expired throughout the army. Although practically all of the Maryland troops re-enlisted, the losses from the battles around New York, combined with the expired enlistments, made necessary a reorganization of the army. In doing so, General Washington organized all of the Maryland troops into seven regiments of the line in the Maryland Brigade, which collectively became known as the "Maryland Line." Smallwood's regiment was too depleted in numbers to form a regiment to itself but it gave many men and officers, including one of the subsequent wartime commanders, to the Fifth Regiment of the Line, and on 10 December 1776, Colonel William Richardson assumed command of the new regiment.

According to the historian James McSherry, writing of the Maryland Line during the Revolutionary War, "No troops in the continental army had rendered better service, endured more fatigue, or won greater glory than the Maryland Line. In proportion to their number, no body of men suffered more severely. They were the first to use the bayonet against the experienced regulars of the enemy, and that in their earliest battle -- and throughout the succeeding struggles of the war, they were most often called on to lead with that bloody weapon into the ranks of the foe. They seldom shrank from the encounter. At Long Island, a fragment of the battalion shook, with repeated charges, a whole brigade of British regulars. At White Plains, they held the advancing columns at bay. At Harlem Heights they drove the enemy from the ground. At Germantown they swept through the hostile camp, with their fixed bayonets, far in advance of the whole army; and at Cowpens, and at Eutaw, their serried ranks bore down all opposition with unloaded muskets. And at Guilford, and at Camden, though victory did not settle on their banners, they fought with a courage which won the admiration and surprise of their enemies. Everywhere they used the bayonet with terrible effect.

Entering into the war with two strong battalions, they were soon reduced to a single company. Again swelled up to seven regiments, they were again thinned by their losses to a single regiment and before the campaign had well passed they were once more promptly recruited to four full battalions of more than two thousand men. The Marylanders are best described as the shock troops of the Continental Army, usually given the toughest assignments by Gen. George Washington.

At least two of their colonels, Williams and Howard, were considered as the best officers of their grade in the army. Gunby, Hall, Smith, Stone, and Ramsey, and the lamented Ford, who dies gallantly at the head of his regiment, were equal to any others in the whole continental service."

=== Whiskey Rebellion ===
Shortly after the Revolutionary War, the regiment was reorganized in Baltimore by its former officers, and in 1794, it responded to President Washington's call for troops to put down the Whiskey Rebellion in Western Pennsylvania by marching from Baltimore to Cumberland. The prompt assemblage of troops under General "Light Horse Harry" Lee caused the uprising to collapse without bloodshed.

=== War of 1812 ===
Baltimore Town remained calm until the outbreak of the War of 1812. The Fifth Regiment had grown into a strong and well trained organization, and as the principal military group in the town, it promptly marched to Bladensburg when news of the British approach to Washington arrived. But here again the experience was similar to that of Smallwood's men at Long Island in 1776. When the British attack began, the hastily assembled raw American militia retreated and the Fifth was left to oppose the British with only Commodore Barney's artillery in support. But the 5th Regiment held its ground until it was swept back by superior British forces.

Not many days later, a British fleet appeared off Baltimore and the Fifth immediately took its place in the defense works. Early on the morning of 12 September 1814, British troops under General Robert Ross attacked the lines held by the Fifth Regiment. Following their landing near Sparrows Point, the British advanced up the Patapsco Neck between Jones Creek and Back River. The Fifth Regiment met the British Army in a heated meeting engagement along the line formed by the Bread and Cheese Creek. Early in the battle, Ross was killed not far in front of the position held by the Independent Blues Company of the regiment. The regiment, outnumbered, slowly fell back to the earthen defenses established across Hampstead Hill (preserved now as Patterson Park). The Battle of North Point along with the formidable defenses around Baltimore convinced British Colonel Arthur Brooke to withdraw and instead bombard Fort McHenry. When the bombardment failed to lead to the fort's capitulation or evacuation by American forces, the British withdrew from the Chesapeake. The 175th Infantry is one of only nineteen Army National Guard units with campaign credit for the War of 1812.

=== Civil War ===
By 1861, the divergent sympathies of a border state had divided the members of the regiment. While most of them supported the Southern cause, and succeeded in making their way out of Baltimore when it passed under Union military control in April 1861, others served in the Union Army. In June, 1861, the Southern sympathizers organized the First Maryland Infantry, CSA, at Harpers Ferry and became part of Thomas "Stonewall" Jackson's Corps which fought the first Battle of Manassas. During the Valley Campaign in 1862, the town of Front Royal, Virginia was defended by Federal troops from Maryland. Upon receiving this information, General Jackson ordered, "Maryland to the Front," to lead the attack. In this action the First Maryland Infantry (CSA) defeated the First Maryland Infantry (USA) at the Battle of Front Royal. They followed that victory with a rout of the Pennsylvania Bucktail Rifles at Harrisonburg on 6 June 1862, earning from Major General Ewell the honor of carrying a "buck tail" on their colors.

Early in 1863, upon expiration of original enlistments, the First Maryland Infantry was disbanded and the Second Maryland Infantry (CSA) was organized under Colonel James R. Herbert, who became Colonel of the Fifth Regiment when it was reorganized after the war. The Second Maryland fought at the battles of Malvern Hill, Winchester, Gettysburg, Cold Harbor, the Siege of Petersburg, and surrendered 63 officers and men with General Lee at Appomattox.

After the end of hostilities, the Maryland State Legislature adopted a Militia Act which until, its repeal in 1867, rendered ineligible for military service in Maryland all those who had served the Confederacy. Consequently, it was not until the latter year that the regiment could be reorganized because most of its former members had served in the Southern army. When it was reorganized on 10 May 1867, former members and new ones enlisted and in about two months it had reassembled a complete organization. In February 1868, the ladies of Baltimore presented a blue and gold silk flag which they had embroidered by hand. This flag had been started before the war and was concealed during the occupation of the city by Federal troops, and the work upon it completed after the return to peace. The distinctive grey full dress uniform of the regiment, patterned after uniforms worn by several of the constituent companies before the war, as far back as 1812, was adopted at this period.

From this time until the Spanish–American War, the regiment, with but two exceptions, was at peace. The exceptions were: first, the violent Baltimore railroad strike of 1877; and, second, in 1894, when it was called into service of the state during labor disturbances among the coal miners in Western Maryland. Aside from these duties, the regiment visited nearly all the cities on the Eastern seaboard on public occasions. In 1876, it participated in the organization of the "Centennial Legion" at the Centennial Exhibition in Philadelphia that year.

=== Spanish–American War and Mexican border ===
On 14 May 1898, the regiment volunteered as a unit for service in the Spanish–American War and was mustered into federal service as the Fifth Maryland Regiment of United States Volunteers. After a short period of encampment near Baltimore, it was dispatched first to Chickamauga, then to Tampa, and finally to Huntsville, Alabama, returning to Baltimore in September of the same year. Like many other organizations in the war, it never reached the scene of active service, but it suffered severely from disease while in the camps, losing a number of men from this cause.

In 7–8 February 1904, the Great Fire destroyed most of the waterfront and central business district of the city. The Fifth Regiment of the Maryland National Guard was called out and spent several days rescuing persons and property and establishing order. In this same year the Fifth Regiment Armory, along North Howard Street near West Chase, and Biddle Streets, under construction for four years with its massive thick granite stone block walls and a barrel-vaulted roof occupying practically an entire city block, was dedicated in Baltimore.

The landmark Fifth Regiment Armory, often serving as a meeting hall and convention place hosted the 1912 Democratic National Convention where Governor Woodrow Wilson of New Jersey received the nomination over Speaker of the U.S. House of Representatives, Champ Clark of Missouri. Two decades later, after a devastating fire in 1932, the old armory was reconstructed using the same walls but a flatter roof. and served as the headquarters for the regiment until 1995.

In 1916, the entire state National Guard was mobilized for service on the Mexican border, ostensibly to put down the Mexican "Pancho Villa", but more probably turned out as unexpected training for World War I, which began in Europe in 1914. The regiment spent eight months at Eagle Pass, Texas until the United States severed diplomatic relations with Germany in February 1917.

=== World War I ===
The regiment had just returned to Baltimore, when in April 1917, the United States entered the First World War. The Fifth Regiment was at once a part of the Army of the United States. In spite of strenuous efforts opposition, the Fifth Maryland was combined with the First Maryland Regiment to form the 115th Infantry Regiment, 58th Brigade, 29th Division on 20 April 1917. Training at Anniston, Alabama, was followed by departure for France. After preliminary service in Alsace, the 115th entered the Meuse-Argonne Offensive on 8 October 1918, and continued in the attack almost up to the close of the war.

=== Interwar period ===
Arrived at the port of Newport News 24 May 1919 on the troopship USS Artemis as elements of the 115th Infantry, and was demobilized on 7 June 1919 at Camp George G. Meade, Maryland. Elements of the former 115th Infantry, less the regimental headquarters, were reorganized as the 5th Infantry, Maryland National Guard, from 1919–23. Assigned in 1921 to the 29th Division. The regimental headquarters was federally recognized on 1 May 1923 at Baltimore, Maryland. The regiment conducted annual summer training most years at Virginia Beach, Virginia, 1921–24, and at Camp Albert C. Ritchie, Cascade, Maryland, 1925–39. Redesignated 175th Infantry on 1 January 1941.

=== World War II ===
In January 1941, the regiment was federalized. The 175th moved to Fort George G. Meade, where it was reinforced by an influx of draftees in April and participated in 29th Division maneuvers in North Carolina that fall. The regiment trained in the United States until 5 October 1942 when it sailed to England on the ocean liner RMS Queen Elizabeth.

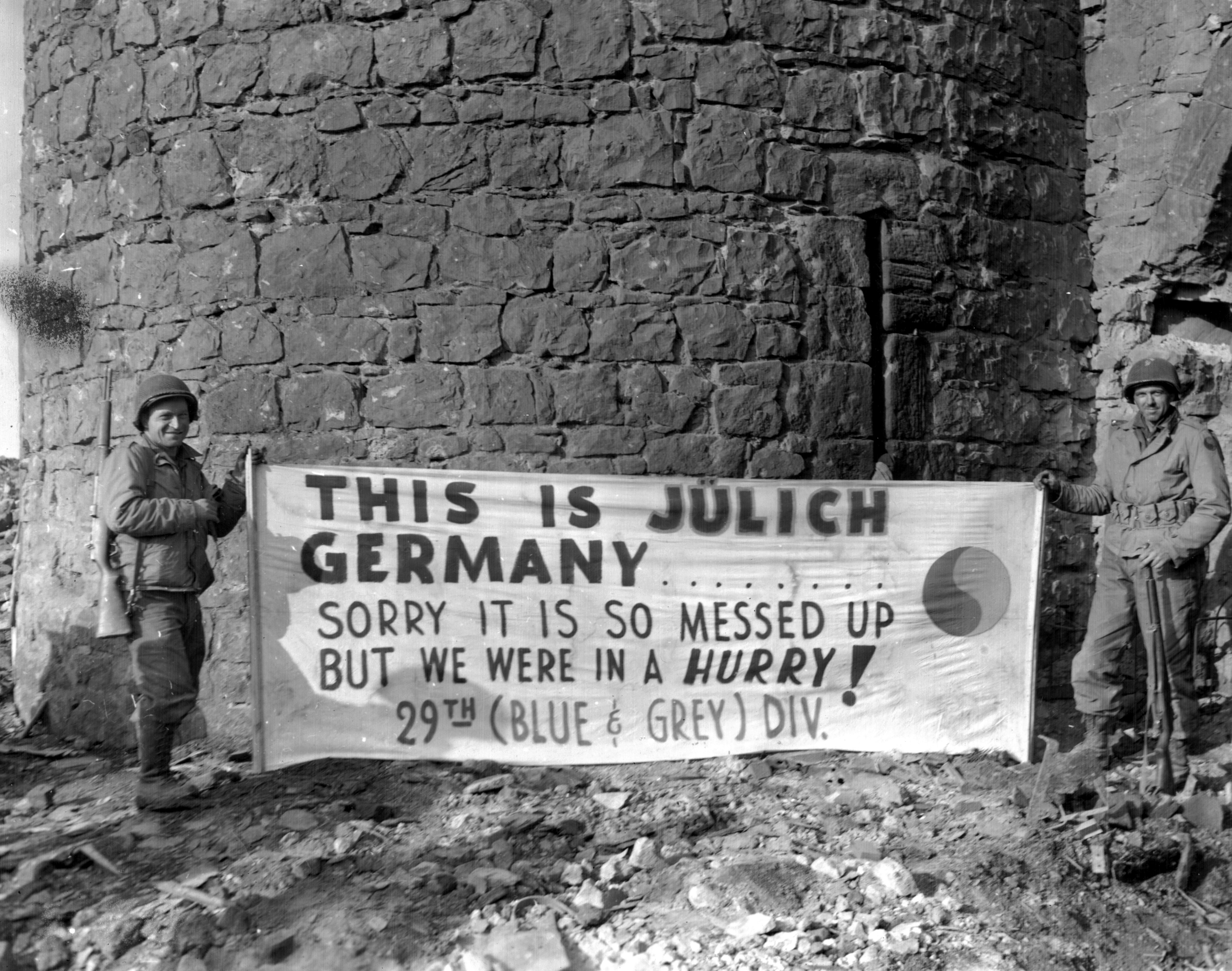
Soldiers of Company C, 175th Infantry Regiment in Jülich, Germany, 24 February 1945.

The 175th was quartered at the Tidworth Barracks where it underwent intense training until its move to Cornwall. The regiment trained on the cold moors during the late summer of 1943 and then transitioned to invasion training. It performed amphibious assault training at Slapton Sands. It was then moved to the invasion assembly area in Devon. On 4 June 1944, the regiment boarded the LSTs which would carry them to the beaches of Normandy. Following a 24-hour delay, the 115th and 116th Infantry assaulted the beaches on 6 June. The 175th, the 29th Division's reserve, landed on the still unsecured Omaha Beach on the morning of 7 June, and proceeded to its objective to seize the village of Isigny. It pushed through Isigny and crossed the Vire River and on to St Lo. The 175th fought stiff German resistance hedgerow by hedgerow. The 1st Battalion, 175th Infantry pushed the American lines to within three miles of St. Lo, creating a salient into the German lines. The unit defended the high ground, known as Hill 108 but nicknamed "Purple Heart Hill," as they were surrounded on three sides.

The regiment was rotated into the division reserve for the final thrust into St Lo. The 175th fought in Normandy until the end of August when the division was moved to Brittany to participate in the capture of Brest and the German submarine pens located there. Following the Battle of Brest, the division was moved to the Netherlands to participate in the 9th Army's drive to the Rhine River. The regiment played a significant role in capturing Jülich followed by the occupation of the industrial center of Mönchengladbach. The regiment was moved to occupy the lines along the Elbe River near Felberg. On 2 May 1945, a patrol from 3-175 Infantry made contact with elements of the 28th Company, 6th Guards Cavalry of the Soviet Red Army. Following the surrender of the German army, the regiment remained in Europe until 1 January 1946.

The 175th demobilized between 11 and 17 January 1946, this time keeping its federal numerical designation. It reorganized as an infantry regiment and regained federal recognition on 12 November 1946.

=== Cold War ===
Following the war, the regiment underwent reorganization and by January 1947, the 175th Infantry was a small but growing activity. The unit trained for emergencies and reinstituted some of its old traditions. It prepared for the possibility of war in Europe until the collapse of the Soviet Union's threat from the late 1940s to the late 1980s. The 175th's infantry battalions were mobilized in 1967, 1968 and 1971 as a response to the race riots in Cambridge and Baltimore and anti-Vietnam War demonstrations in College Park in Maryland. The 1990s brought preparation for combat in the Middle East as the training focus slowly changed from woodland combat to urban operations.

During the Cold War, the 175th Infantry was alternately assigned to the reactivated 58th Infantry Brigade, the 3rd Brigade, 28th Infantry Division, and the 3rd Brigade, 29th Infantry Division. In 1985, the 175th Infantry Regiment was reduced to two battalions under the 3rd Brigade, 29th Division and in 1995, it was reduced to a single battalion. Individual members of the battalion participated in peacekeeping in the Sinai Peninsula in 1994 and in Bosnia-Herzegovina in 2001.

=== Global war on terror ===
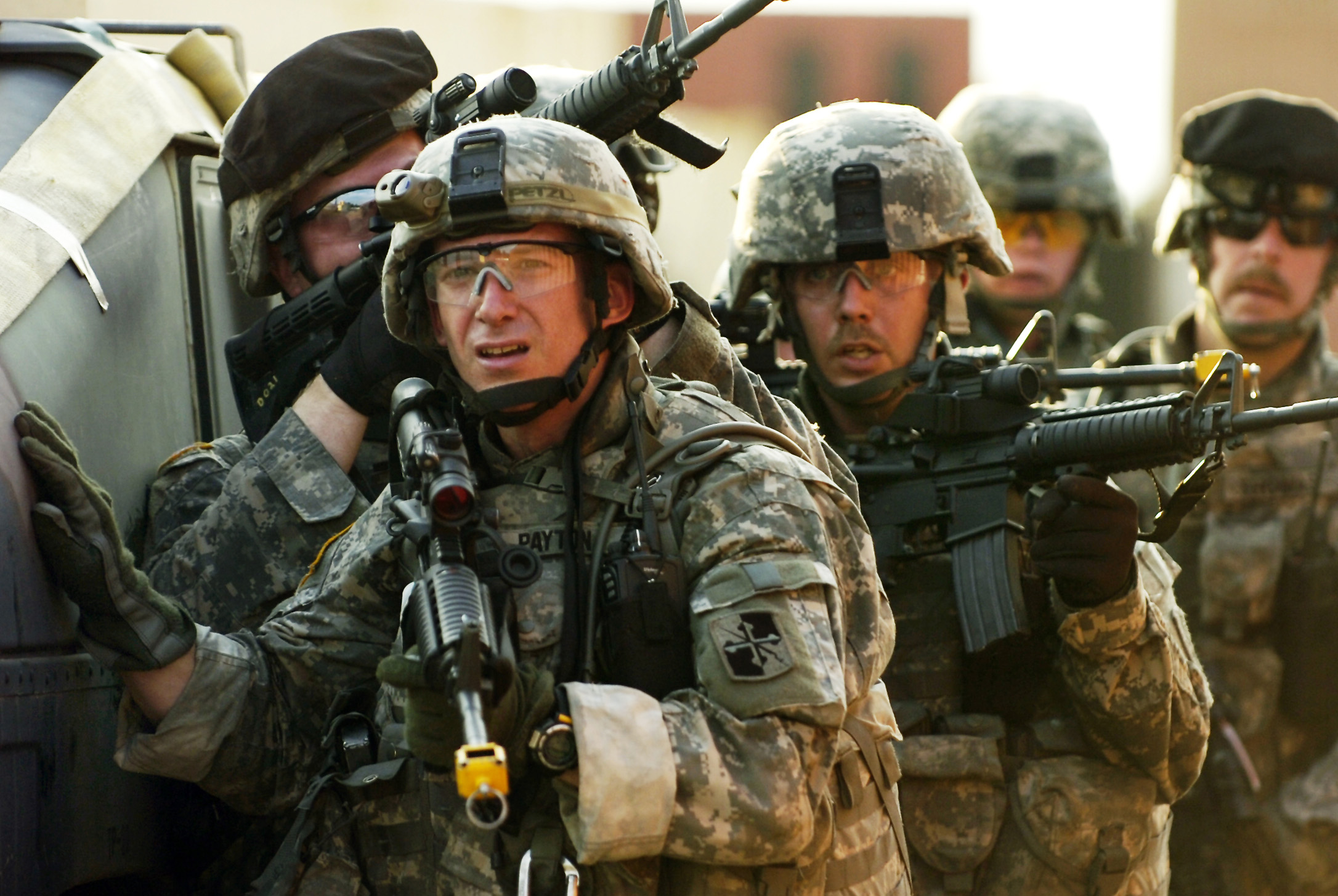
U.S. Army Soldiers from Charlie and Delta Companies, 1st Battalion, 175th Infantry Regiment, Maryland Army National Guard training at Fort Dix, N.J. for a scheduled deployment to Iraq.

Following the attacks of 11 September 2001, more than 100 members of 1st Battalion, 175th Infantry were individually mobilized to protect key airports in Maryland. This was followed by the battalion's mobilization in 2003 for Operation Noble Eagle, to protect Andrews Air Force Base and the Warfield Air National Guard Base, both in Maryland.

Several officers and senior enlisted soldiers from the battalion have served as advisors for both the Afghan National Army and the Iraqi Army. In September 2005, the battalion deployed several platoons and a company headquarters in support of the Hurricane Katrina relief effort in Mississippi and Louisiana. Thirty-two 1-175 Infantry soldiers served in a composite company, formed from 1-175 Infantry, from August to September 2006 on a section of the U.S. / Mexico Border in an effort to halt illegal immigration and smuggling. Others from the battalion guarded the prisoners of the Global War on Terrorism at the Naval Base at Guantanamo Bay, Cuba from 2006 to 2007.

Company B, then a part of the 1st Battalion, 115th Infantry, was the first infantry company from Maryland mobilized for combat since World War II. Company B mobilized as a separate company and was attached to the 1st Battalion, 118th Field Artillery 48th Infantry Brigade from the Georgia Army National Guard, and deployed to Iraq in 2005. Company B was placed under the Operational Control of 2nd Battalion, 70th Armor of the 1st Armored Division (TF 2/70 Armor) and designated as their main effort. Company B conducted full spectrum operations against enemy forces in the vicinity of Saba Al Boor, Iraq while operating out of a Combat Outpost in the center of Saba Al Boor. Company B conducted over 660 Combat Steady State Patrols, conducted over 20 Company level operations and participated in 7 Battalion Level Operations (6 of which Company B was the Battalion main effort). Company B received a change of mission and was returned to the control of 1/118th Field Artillery, 48th Infantry Brigade. Then transitioned to providing gun truck escort to combat logistics patrols between Al Asad and the Jordanian border (600 mile round trip) reducing the cargo loss rate of over 11% to less than 2%. Company B completed 25 three-day missions to Jordan and 75 short range combat logistics patrols. The men of Company B were entered into the Order of the Spur by 2/70th Armor. During their tour they completed over 320 days of combat operations, earned 11 Purple Hearts, 13 Bronze Stars, 8 Meritorious Service Medals, 3 Army Commendation Medals with V device, 144 Army Commendation Medals, 14 Army Achievement Medals, 2 Georgia Commendation Medals, and 124 Combat Infantryman/Combat Action Badges. They returned home in May 2006 and were reassigned to the 1st Battalion, 175th Infantry and alerted for their next deployment less than one year later.

In March 2007, the entire battalion was alerted for its deployment to Iraq. On 22 May 2007, the battalion was federalized and on 25 May, it reported to Fort Dix, New Jersey for post-mobilization training in preparation for security forces operations in Northern Iraq. The first elements from the battalion arrived at Camp Buehring, Kuwait, in early August 2007 and deployed into Iraq after a week of acclimatization and training. The remainder of the battalion arrived in theater by 21 August and all had been flown to their bases by 1 September. 1-175 Infantry was assigned to the 3rd Sustainment Brigade, of the 3rd Infantry Division. The battalion was deployed to the former Iraqi air base west of Qayyarah, Iraq, known as Q-West. The battalion headquarters retained command and control of HHC and Company A, with additional command and control of a contract security force made up of local Iraqis and Ugandans. They conducted aggressive base defense operations on and in the vicinity of the Q-West base complex. Company B was attached to the 17th Combat Sustainment Support Battalion to conduct gun truck escort to combat logistics patrols throughout the Ninewah Provence, also known as Multi-National Division – North (MND-N). Company B was the first company in the battalion to begin conducting combat patrols in Iraq. Company B conducted patrols to the Kirkuk Governorate (Kirkuk) Wasit Governorate (Camp Anaconda) and the Ninewah Governorate ( Tal Afar and Mosul). Company C was detached and deployed to Forward Operating Base Marez and the Logistics Support Area Diamondback located in Mosul, Iraq. There, Company C was attached to the 87th Combat Service and Support Battalion, where they conducted base defense operations and convoy logistics patrols to and from the border crossing at Habur Gate, Turkey. Company D was attached to the 17th Combat Sustainment Support Battalion to conduct gun truck escort to combat logistics patrols throughout the Ninewah Provence. The battalion also supported combat, logistics and counter improvised explosive device (IED) operations conducted with both US and Iraqi Army forces throughout MND-N. The battalion suffered only 8 wounded while serving 250 days of continuous operations. Collectively, the battalion conducted 310 combat logistics patrols, 81 route clearance operations and 280 reaction force operations. The battalion redeployed to Fort Dix in mid-April 2008.

=== Present day ===
Since 1 Sep. 2010, 1-175 Infantry has been assigned for its federal mission to the 2nd Brigade Combat Team, 28th Infantry Division but is overseen by the 58th Troop Command when not in federal service. The 1st Battalion is organized as an IBCT light infantry battalion under the brigade unit of action table of organization and equipment.

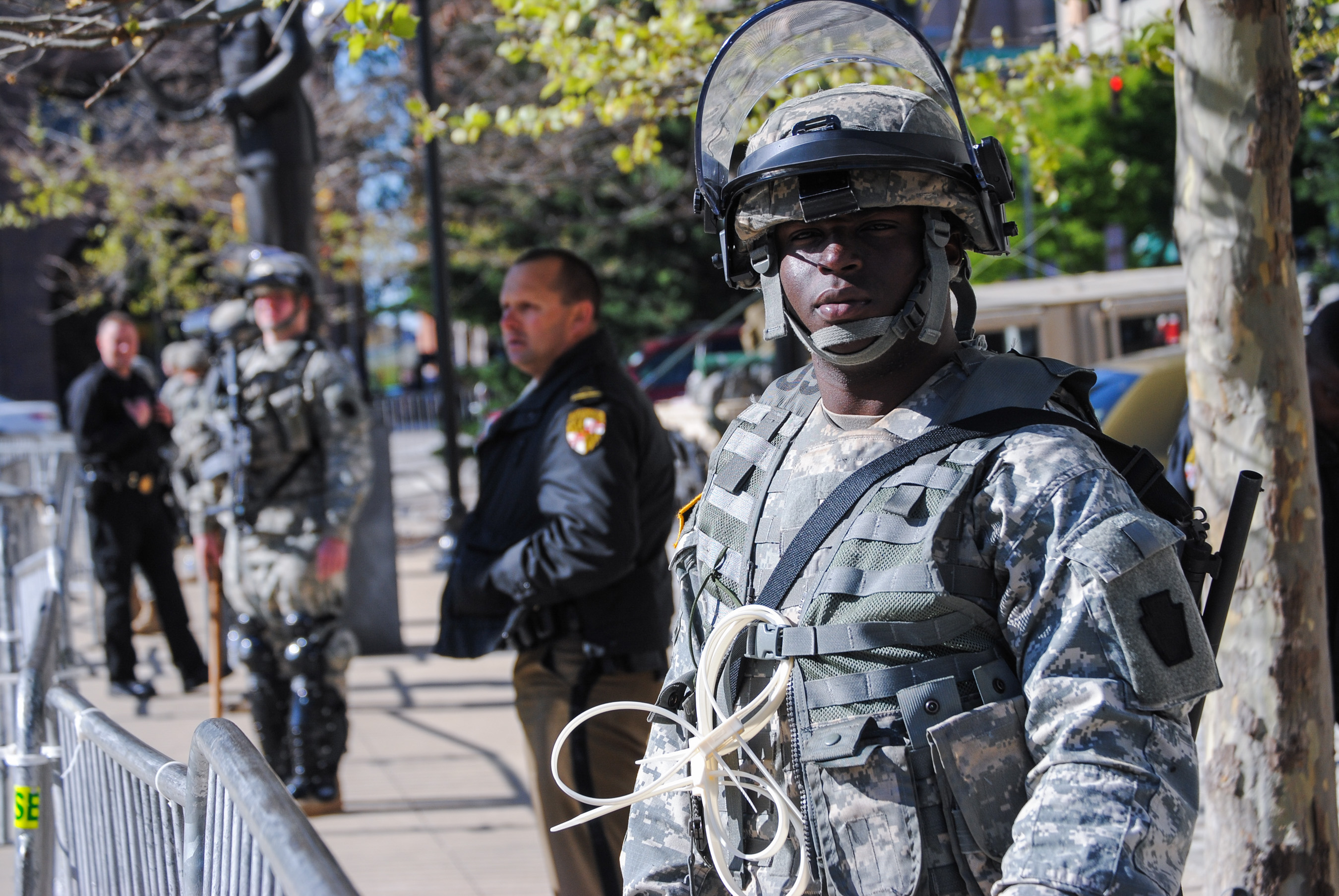
A soldier from 1st Battalion, 175th Infantry Regiment keeps watch in front of Baltimore City Hall during the 2015 Baltimore protests

In January 2010, 1-175 Infantry again was notified that it would be mobilized and deployed, this time as the U.S. infantry battalion assigned to the Multinational Force and Observers (MFO) Mission #55 in the Sinai Peninsula, enforcing the Camp David Accords and the Treaty of Peace between Egypt and Israel. It was mobilized on 21 March 2011 and moved to Camp Atterbury, Indiana for a brief period of pre-mobilization training. The battalion deployed to the Sinai on 27 April 2011. 1-175 Infantry was the first U.S. force to perform this mission after the overthrow of the Mubarak regime during the Arab Spring revolution in Egypt. The battalion faced security challenges in and around their area of operations, including increased weapons trafficking, terrorist attacks, and conflicts with Bedouin tribes. The battalion returned to Camp Atterbury on 9 March 2012.

In May 2015, 1-175 Infantry was called to assist Local authorities with civil unrest during riots throughout the city of Baltimore. Operation Baltimore Rally lasted nearly 8 days and involved all four line companies and the Headquarters Company of the Battalion. The Soldiers of the 1-175 Infantry assisted local authorities in regaining control of the city and maintaining peace.

In March 2020, 1-175 Infantry was again called to assist the state in response to the COVID-19 pandemic, helping support food distribution sites and testing sites throughout the state. In 2021, the battalion responded to the January 6th insurrection at the U.S. Capitol Building. In 2024, the battalion sent companies to Ghana, Senegal, and Tunisia to participate in U.S. AFRICOM’s African Lion exercise. In 2026, the battalion will again return to Africa as part of CJTF-HOA, conducting security and stability operations in Djibouti.

Current units:
Dundalk Readiness Center, Dundalk, Maryland – Headquarters and Headquarters Company (HHC) ("Governor's Guard")
Dundalk Readiness Center, Dundalk, Maryland – Detachment 1, Headquarters and Headquarters Battery, 1-107th Field Artillery Regiment
Frederick, Maryland – Company A
La Plata, Maryland – Company B
Glen Burnie, Maryland – Company C
Easton, Maryland – Company D
Dundalk Readiness Center, Dundalk, Maryland – Company H/128 BSB (Forward Support Co.)

== Lineage ==
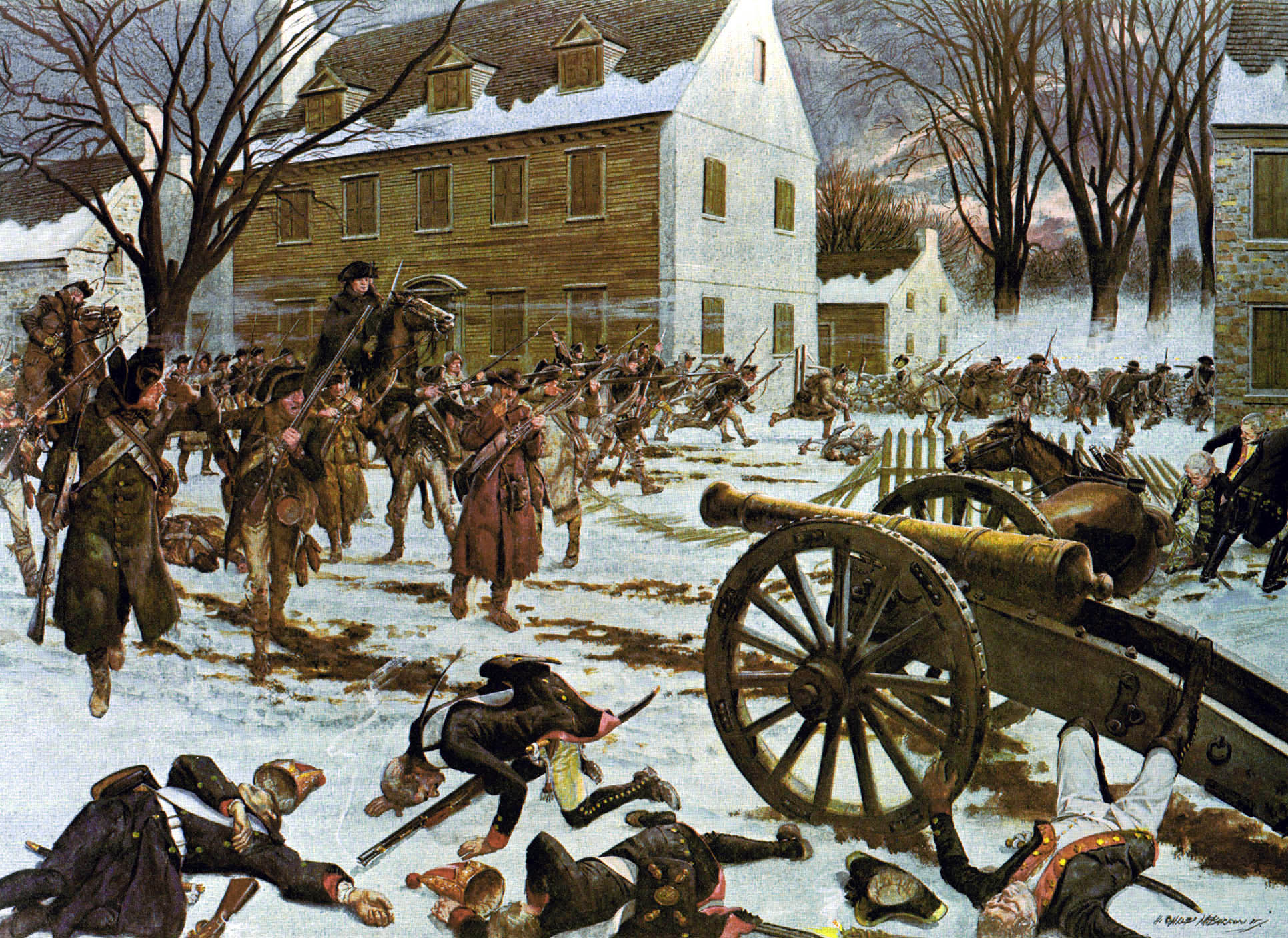
Remnants of Smallwood's Regiment crossed the Delaware with General Washington to capture the Hessian force at Trenton on the morning of 26 December 1776. Painting by H. Charles McBarron Jr., 1975.

• Formed 3 Dec. 1774, in Baltimore, Maryland, as the Baltimore Independent Cadets (later called the Baltimore Independent Company).
• Absorbed into 1st or Smallwood's Battalion (or Regiment), organized 2 Jan. 1776, with eight battalion companies and attached independent companies.
• Smallwood's Maryland Regiment reorganized and expanded into the Maryland Brigade, Continental Line (comprising the 1st, 2nd, 3rd, 4th, 5th, 6th, and 7th Maryland Battalions), 10 Dec. 1776-27 Mar. 1777.
• Reorganized into the 1st and 2nd Maryland Brigades, 1780.
• Reorganized into a single regiment of two battalions designated 1st Maryland Regiment, 13 Sept. 1780.
• Reorganized as the Maryland Battalion, 12 Apr. 1783.
• Mustered out 15 Nov. 1783, at Baltimore, Maryland.
• First Baltimore Light Infantry Company of Volunteers organized in Dec. 1787.
• Volunteer militia companies of Baltimore organized into the 5th Regiment of Militia, June 1794, to include nine companies, divided into two battalions.
• Mustered into Federal Service, 19 Aug. 1814.
• Mustered out of Federal Service, 18 Nov. 1814.
• 53rd Regiment of Volunteer Infantry constituted in Baltimore, Maryland, of Volunteer Militia companies, Dec. 1835 (The 53rd Regiment formed, with the now-designated 5th Regiment of Volunteer Infantry and other elements. The First Light Division of Maryland Volunteers. Exchange of companies between the 53rd and 5th Regiments was not uncommon).
• Elements of the 5th and 53rd Regiments reorganized at Harpers Ferry during May and June 1861 as the Maryland Battalion C.S.A. (Company A mustered into Confederate service 21 May 1861).
• Redesignated 1st Regiment Maryland Infantry, C.S.A., 16 June 1861.
• 1st Regiment Maryland Infantry, C.S.A., mustered out Aug.17, 1862 at Gordonsville, Virginia.
• Reorganized as the 1st Battalion Maryland Infantry at Winchester, Virginia, 2 Oct. 1862.
• Redesignated 2nd Battalion Maryland Infantry, 19 Jan. 1864.
• Parolled at Appomattox, Virginia, 10 Apr. 1865.
• 5th Regiment of Volunteer Infantry reorganized 10 May 1867, at Baltimore, Maryland, about a nucleus of former members of the Maryland Guard (1859–61) and the 1st and 2nd Maryland Infantry, C.S.A.
• Mustered into Federal service 14 May 1898, at Pimlico, Maryland.
• Mustered out of Federal service 22 Oct 1898, at Baltimore, Maryland.
• Called into Federal service 18 June 1916.
• Mustered out of Federal service, 24 Feb. 1917.
• Mustered into Federal service 20 Apr. 1917 (Hq. Company and Supply Company, 5th Infantry Regiment, MDNG, redesignated Hq. Company and Supply Company, 112th Field Artillery Regiment, later 110th Field Artillery Regiment, on 1 Oct. 1917; Machine Gun company reassigned to 110th MG Battalion; remaining companies became elements of the 115th Infantry Regiment, 29th Division.
• Demobilized 2–7 June 1919, at Camp Meade, Maryland.
• 5th Infantry Regiment, MDNG, reorganized at Baltimore, Maryland, between Dec. 1919 and Apr. 1923; Headquarters Federally recognized 1 May 1923.
• Reorganized and redesignated 5th Infantry Regiment (Rifle), MDNG, 1 May 1940.
• Redesignated 175th Infantry Regiment (Rifle), 1 Jan. 1941.
• Inducted into Federal service 3 Feb. 1941, as a component of the 29th Infantry Division.
• Inactivated 11-17 Jan. 1946, at Camp Kilmer, New Jersey.
• 175th Infantry Regiment reorganized and Federally recognized 12 Nov. 1946.

== Distinctive unit insignia ==
- Description

A Gold color metal and enamel device 1 5/16 inches (3.33 cm) in height consisting of a cross bottony quarterly Gules and Argent surmounted by a Gray roundel bearing the number "5" in Gold within a Red belt garnished Gold with the inscription "DECUS ET PRAESIDIUM" in Gold letters.

- Symbolism

The red color of the annulet is symbolic of the red uniforms of the Baltimore Independent Cadets, the military forebears of the Regiment, which during the War of the Revolution were incorporated in Smallwood's Regiment of the Maryland Line. Superimposed on the annulet is a belt of military design and origin containing the inscription "Decus Et Praesidium," the regimental motto which is translated "An Honour and a Guard." The belt is the heraldic symbol of knighthood and identifies the insignia as being of the military order, while the gray field represents the Confederate Service in the Civil War. The numeral "5," the historic designation of the regiment, was assigned following the Revolutionary War by act of the General Assembly of Maryland in 1794. The insignia is the design of the Crossland Arms, Alicia Crossland having been the mother of George Calvert, 1st Baron Baltimore and planner of the colony of Maryland. The insignia symbolizes the historic record of the regiment from 1774 to 1931. The cross bottony forms the escutcheon, and the annulet represents the five most significant periods in the regiment's history until the time of adoption: 1774—the organization of the Baltimore Independent Cadets; 1776—the Revolutionary War; 1814—War of 1812; 1861—the Civil War, Confederate Service; and 1918—World War I.

- Background

The distinctive unit insignia was approved on 9 July 1958.

== Coat of arms ==
- Blazon
  - Shield- Azure, two pallets Argent, a torteau charged with a swan's head erased of the second, on a chief paly of six Or and Sable a bend counterchanged, a bayonet (c. 1776) fesswise Silver.
  - Crest- That for the regiments and separate battalions of the Maryland Army National Guard: On a wreath of the colors Argent and Azure, a cross bottony per cross quarterly Gules and Argent.
  - Motto- Decus et Praesidium (An Honour and a Guard).
- Symbolism- The colors blue and white are for Infantry, white the original color of Infantry facings has been superseded by blue; the combination of the old and new colors signifies the regiment has been Infantry since organization. The five stripes have a dual significance. They represent the regiment's participation in five major wars, i.e., The Revolution, War of 1812, Civil War (C.S.A.), World Wars I and II. The Whiskey Rebellion 1794, Harpers Ferry 1859, War with Spain 1898 and The Mexican Border Incident 1916, are not referenced, though Federal Service, since combat was not involved. They also indicate the former regimental designation, the Fifth Maryland, 1794–1941, and the popular sobriquet, "The Dandy Fifth of Maryland." The torteau alludes to the red of the uniform of the Baltimore Independent Cadets, the initial uniformed militia company of the Colony of Maryland; this uniform was later adopted during the Revolutionary War by Smallwood's Regiment of the Maryland Line. The swan is from the coat of arms of the Gist family and commemorates Mordecai Gist who on 3 December 1774 organized and commanded the Baltimore Independent Cadets, the parent unit of the regiment. The gold and black pattern in chief is from the reverse of the Great Seal of the proprietary Colony of Maryland, the family coat of arms of the Calverts, under whose authority the Mordecai Gist company was organized. The bayonet is representative of its introduction to American arms at the Battle of Long Island 1776, by the Maryland Line and in the use of which it became famed throughout the War. It is also symbolic of the Maryland 400 which by repeated charges and sustaining heavy losses delayed General Howe's army, which enabled General Washington to successfully withdraw his defeated army across the Hudson River.
- The coat of arms was approved on 9 July 1958.

== Unit decorations ==
Ribbon	Award	Year	Notes
A blue ribbon with gold frame.	Presidential Unit Citation, World War II	1944	ST. LAURENT-SUR-MER (earned by the 115th Infantry)
A blue ribbon with gold frame.	Presidential Unit Citation, World War II	1944	ST. LO (earned by the 1st Battalion, 175th Infantry)
A red ribbon with four vertical dark green stripes in the center.	Army Superior Unit Award	2022	Streamer embroidered 2021-2022
A red ribbon with four vertical dark green stripes in the center.	Army Superior Unit Award	2012	Streamer embroidered 2011-2012
A red ribbon with four vertical dark green stripes in the center.	French Croix de Guerre, World War II (with Palm)	1944	Streamer embroidered BEACHES OF NORMANDY (earned by the 175th Infantry)
A red ribbon with four vertical dark green stripes in the center.	French Croix de Guerre, World War II (with Palm)	1944	Streamer embroidered ST. LAURENT-SUR-MER (earned by the 115th Infantry)
A red ribbon with four vertical dark green stripes in the center.	French Croix de Guerre, World War II (with Silver-Gilt Star)	1944	Streamer embroidered ST. LO JUN 1944 (earned by the 1st Battalion, 175th Infantry)
A red ribbon with four vertical dark green stripes in the center.	French Croix de Guerre, World War II (with Silver-Gilt Star)	1944	Streamer embroidered ST. LO JUN 1944 (earned by the 1st Battalion, 115th Infantry)
A red ribbon with four vertical dark green stripes in the center.	French Croix de Guerre, World War II (with Silver-Gilt Star)	1944	Streamer embroidered BREST (earned by the 2nd Battalion, 175th Infantry)
Company B (Silver Spring), 1st Battalion, additionally entitled to:
A blue ribbon with gold frame.	Meritorious Unit Commendation	1945	Streamer embroidered EUROPEAN THEATER (earned by the Service Company, 115th Infantry)
Company D (Easton), 1st Battalion, additionally entitled to:
A blue ribbon with gold frame.	Meritorious Unit Commendation	2008	Streamer embroidered IRAQ SEP 2007-MAR 2008
