= Sterrett =

Sterrett is a surname. Notable people with the surname include:

- Cliff Sterrett (1883–1964), American cartoonist
- Dutch Sterrett (Charles Hurlbut Sterrett) (1889–1965), American professional baseball player
- Frances Roberta Sterrett (1869–1947), American writer
- Frank W. Sterrett (1885–1976), American Episcopal bishop
- J. Macbride Sterrett (1847–1923), American psychologist
- Jack Sterrett (1901–1984), American sports coach
- James Sterrett (c. 1764–1825), American military officer
- James P. Sterrett (1822–1901), American judge
- Jean Anderson Sterrett (1924–2022), Australian-American pianist, actor, playwright, and composer
- John H. Sterrett (c. 1815–1879), American ship captain and investor
- John Robert Sitlington Sterrett (1851–1914), American classical scholar and archaeologist
- Joseph Edmund Sterrett (1870–1934), American accountant
- Ray Sterrett (born 1965), Australian rules footballer
- Samuel B. Sterrett (1922–2013), judge of the United States Tax Court
- Virginia Frances Sterrett (1900–1931), American artist and illustrator

== See also ==
- Sterritt (surname)
- Sterett (surname)
