= Thomas Ruckle =

American painter

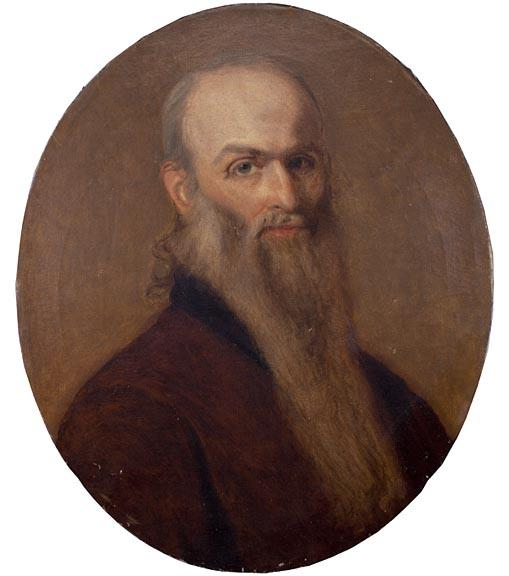
- Born: 1776; Ireland
- Died: 1853
- Occupation: Painter
- Notable work: The Battle of North Point; The Defense of Baltimore

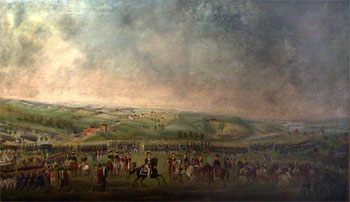
The Defense of Baltimore - Assembling of the Troops, painted by Thomas Ruckle c1814 or 1815.

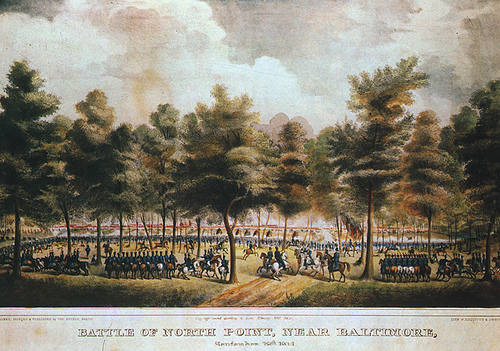
The Battle of North Point, Lithograph based on the original painting by Thomas Ruckle c1814 or 1815.

Thomas Ruckle (1776–1853) was a house painter and sign painter in early nineteenth-century Baltimore, Maryland, and an amateur painter. He is best known for his paintings The Battle of North Point, and The Defense of Baltimore. Ruckle was a veteran of the War of 1812, in which he had served as a corporal in the 5th Maryland Regiment of the Maryland Militia.

== Early life ==
Ruckle was born in Ireland and, having moved to Baltimore, Maryland, he became a sign painter and house painter. It is likely that he had very little, if any, formal training as an artist.

== War of 1812 ==
Ruckle fought in the Maryland Militia during the War of 1812, and took part in the Battle of North Point, during which the Maryland Militia under General John Stricker were able to hold up the British advance long enough to secure the successful defense of Baltimore.

Ruckle served as a Corporal with the Washington Blues, a company of the 5th Maryland Regiment.

Ruckle's paintings The Battle of North Point, and The Defense of Baltimore were painted shortly after the events they describe, and are now in the collection of the Maryland Historical Society. The latter was included in an exhibit of American battle painting at the Museum of Modern Art in 1944.

== Family life ==
Ruckle's son Thomas Coke Ruckle (1811–1891) was also a painter. He received a formal training in fine art at the Royal Academy in London from 1839 to 1841. On his return to Maryland he became a successful portrait painter, working out of a studio in Baltimore St. He also worked as an illustrator, creating a series of scenes of the American West, and also a number of drawings for a volume titled Early History of Methodism in Maryland, published in 1866.

== See also ==
- Battle of North Point
- Battle of Baltimore
