= Arthur Brooke (British Army officer) =

British Army officer (1772–1843)

Lieutenant-General Sir Arthur Brooke KCB
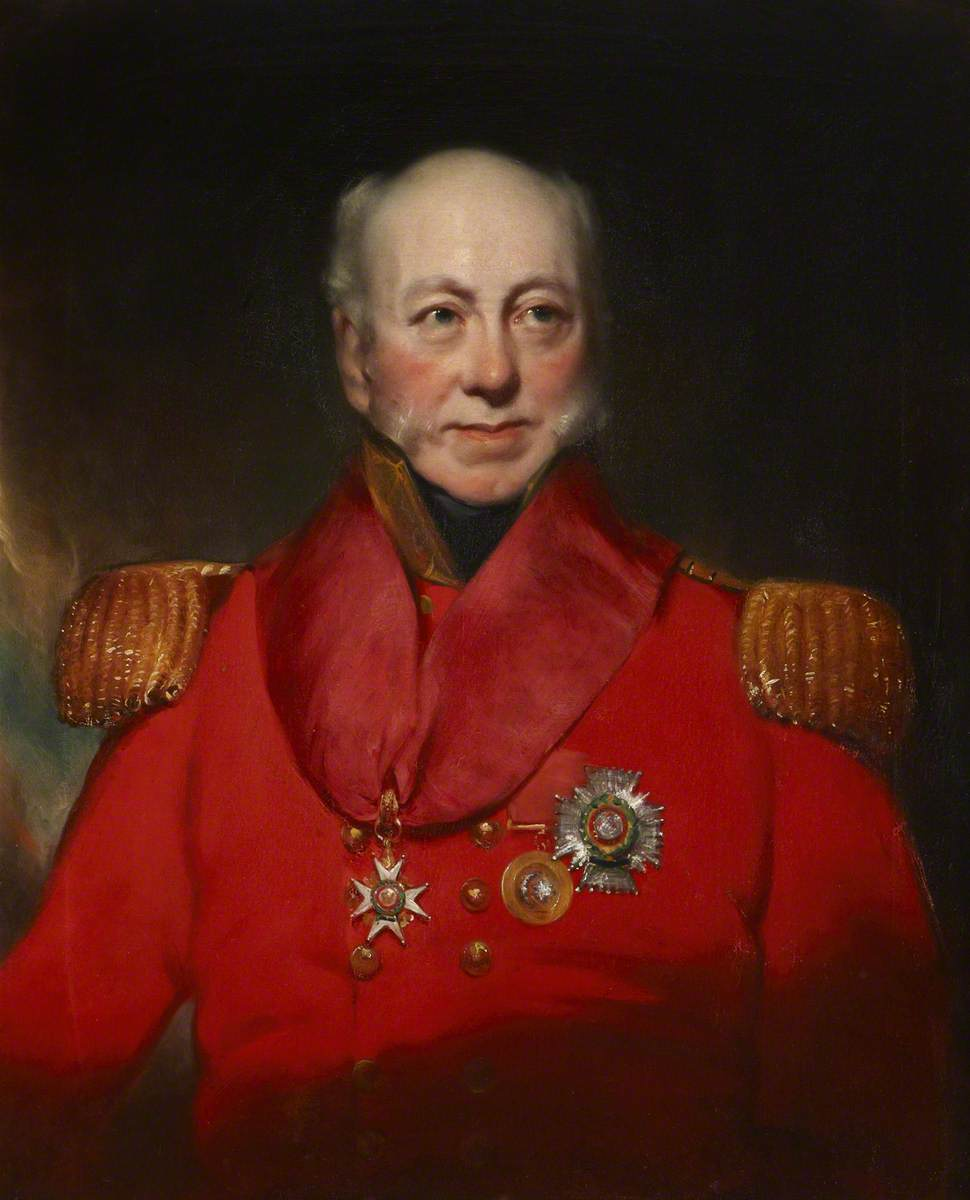
- Portrait by Martin Cregan, c. 1838
- Born: 1772; Fermanagh, Ireland
- Died: 26 July 1843 (aged 70–71); George Street, Portman Square, London
- Military career
- Allegiance: Great Britain; United Kingdom
- Branch: British Army
- Service years: 1792–1843
- Rank: Lieutenant-General
- Unit: 44th Regiment of Foot
- Conflicts: French Revolutionary Wars; Napoleonic Wars; Peninsular War; Battle of Ordal; War of 1812; Battle of Bladensburg; Burning of Washington; Battle of Baltimore; Battle of North Point
- Awards: Knight Commander of the Bath

Lieutenant-General Sir Arthur Brooke, KCB (1772 – 26 July 1843) was a British Army officer who served in the French Revolutionary and Napoleonic Wars and War of 1812.

== Early life ==
Arthur Brooke was the third son of Francis Brooke of Colebrooke, County Fermanagh. He was the younger brother of Sir Henry Brooke, who was created a baronet in 1822, and the nephew of Sir Arthur Brooke, who was also created a baronet in 1764.

== Military career ==
He entered the Army as an ensign in the 44th Regiment of Foot in 1792, at the commencement of the French Revolutionary Wars and served with this regiment throughout them, and the succeeding Napoleonic Wars, until the conclusion of the general peace in 1815. He was promoted to lieutenant in 1793, serving with the 44th Foot in Lord Moira's division in Flanders in 1794 and 1795. He was promoted to captain in 1795, serving with Sir Ralph Abercromby's army in the reduction of the West Indies, where his regiment remained until 1798. He was present throughout the Egyptian campaign of 1801. He was promoted to major in 1802 and lieutenant-colonel in 1804 and commanded the 44th in Malta from 1804 to 1812.

In 1813 he was promoted to colonel, and accompanied Lord William Bentinck to the east coast of Spain. Brooke, as senior colonel, took command of his regiment's brigade and distinguished himself in every action against Louis-Gabriel Suchet, and particularly at the Battle of Ordal.

=== War of 1812 ===
At the conclusion of the war with Napoleon in 1814, Brooke was gazetted a Companion of the Bath and ordered to march regiments from Bentinck's army across the south of France to Bordeaux, in order to embark at that port for an expedition against the United States of America, which was still at war with Britain since June 1812, in the War of 1812. The force embarked consisted of the three battalions of the 44th, 85th and 21st Foot, commanded by Lieutenant Colonels Brooke, William Thornton and William Paterson respectively. The Chesapeake Bay campaign expedition was under the general command of Major-General Robert Ross and the naval command on the North American Station with Vice Admiral Sir Alexander Cochrane and Rear Admiral Sir George Cockburn.

Sailing up the Patuxent River on the south-western shore of the Chesapeake Bay of Maryland, in August 1814, and landing at Benedict, the force proceeded overland through Prince George's County to the Eastern Branch of the Potomac River, (now known as the Anacostia River) to the small bridge crossing there. In the Battle of Bladensburg, victory was secured by the flank movement of Brooke's brigade. The brigade consisted of the 4th Regiment of Foot, commanded by his brother, Francis Brooke, and his own 44th. Following the "Bladensburg Races" in which the disorganized American militia under Gen. William Winder (observed by President James Madison and Secretary of State and future President James Monroe) did not stand and fight the new "Congreve rocket" used by the "Redcoats", they proceeded into the national capital for the occupation of the town. After burning the Capitol, Executive Mansion and other public buildings of Washington, the expedition re-embarked at Benedict, Maryland and sailed back down for refitting at Tangier Island in the lower Chesapeake Bay.

Then, the next month, up to the mouth of the Patapsco River, where the troops were to land and advance on Baltimore, a major port city and "nest of pirates" for the substantial numbers of "privateers" that had raided British commercial shipping during the War. During the land attack from the town's east side, the fleet's ships were to force their way up the Middle and Northwest Branches of the river and bombard Fort McHenry which guarded the port. In the first skirmish of the Battle of Baltimore, before the Battle of North Point, General Ross was killed by supposedly two American snipers (traditionally Henry G. Wells and Daniel McComas of Aisquith's Sharpshooters, celebrated on Defenders' Day) and fell into the arms of his personal aide and Brooke later assumed command of the army. The regiments advanced further and clashed with the units of Stricker waiting for them further up the peninsula. "By the fall of our gallant leader," wrote Ensign George Gleig in his eyewitness account, "the command now devolved on Colonel Brooke, of the 44th, an officer of decided personal courage but perhaps better calculated to lead a battalion than to guide an army." Brooke determined to carry out his predecessor's plan. It was reported that Baltimore was defended by 20,000 American soldiers and militia with about 100 artillery pieces behind extensive earthworks and berms of fortifications stretching for several miles along the town's east side, under the seasoned command of Maryland Militia Maj. Gen. Samuel Smith. Brooke advanced and attacked a powerful force of militia on 12 September advanced earlier from the town, as the City Brigade of Brig Gen. John Stricker to the narrow part of the "Patapsco Neck" peninsula between Bread and Cheese Creek, which flowed north into Back River and Bear Creek (flowing south into the Patapsco), an area known as "Godly Wood". After facing the forces of several bastions including "Rodgers' Bastion" manned by sailors of the U.S. Navy under Commodore John Rodgers, after the experience at Bladensburg, he expected Baltimore was supposedly then at his mercy, but on finding that the sailors of the bombarding ships of the Royal Navy could not come further up the river's Northwest Branch to his assistance after a two-day bombardment by subduing the still active guns of the fort, even after a night-time landing party expedition by barge during the driving rainstorm to the fort's western flank under Capt. Charles Napier was discovered and fired upon and turned back by supporting Forts Covington and Babcock. Having also already moved his forces north and south before the Americans' trenches, probing for a weak point and finding large numbers of his opponents moving in concert with him, forestalling any attempt to get around the wings of the defenders. After an officers' conference, he quietly retired down the peninsula back to North Point after bivouacking on the scene of his "victory".

The fleet sailed southward, and was joined at sea by a battalion of the 93rd, five companies of the 95th, and by Major-General John Keane, who superseded Brooke, after delivering to him a most eulogistic despatch from the commander-in-chief. The British, receiving further reinforcements, came under the command of General Sir Edward Pakenham in December 1814. Several engagements culminated with the Battle of New Orleans on 8 January 1815. Brooke assumed command of the 2nd Brigade when General Samuel Gibbs was killed. Brooke's troops captured Fort Bowyer on 12 February 1815.

== Later life ==
At the close of the war, Brooke returned to England and in 1822 was rewarded by being made governor of Yarmouth. He was also promoted to major-general in 1819. He was made colonel of the 86th Regiment in 1837 and promoted to lieutenant-general that year. He was gazetted a Knight Commander of the Bath in 1833, and died on 26 July 1843 at his residence on George Street, Portman Square in London and was buried at Kensal Green Cemetery.

Military offices
Preceded by James Watson	Colonel of the 86th (Royal County Down) Regiment of Foot; 1837–1843	Succeeded by John Maister
