= Joseph Sterett =

- Born: 1773; Maryland
- Died: 1821 (aged 47–48); Maryland
- Military career
- Allegiance: United States of America; Maryland Militia
- Rank: Lieutenant colonel (United States)
- Commands: 5th Maryland Regiment, Maryland Militia
- Conflicts: War of 1812: Battle of Bladensberg; Battle of North Point
- Other work: planter

Joseph Sterett (1773–1821), also known as Joseph Sterrett, was a Maryland militia officer who served during the Battle of Baltimore during the War of 1812. At the Battle of Bladensberg and the Battle of North Point he commanded the 5th Maryland Regiment, composed largely of volunteers from Baltimore.

== Early life ==
Sterett was born in 1773. He married Molly Harris, and farmed at a 260-acre slave plantation known as "Mount Deposit". The couple had eleven children. They are as follows (YOB & Death where documented in parentheses): David Harris (1801), Essex (1803–1835), Frances Mary (1804–1805), Josephine (1805–1826), James William I (1807–1808), James William II (1808–1857), Mary Harris Winder(1810–1876), Joseph (1812–1874), Maria Ridgley Hollins (1814–1852), Louisa Sherlock Hollins (1816–1889), and Augusta Temple (1818–1819).

== War of 1812 ==
=== Battle of Bladensberg ===
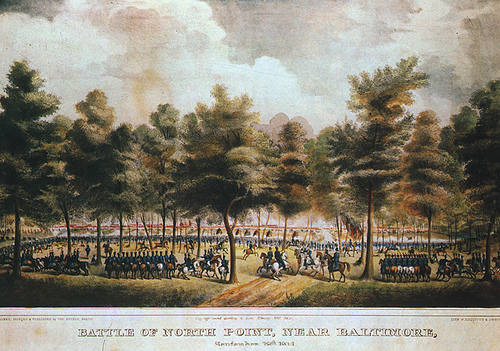
The Battle of North Point, by militiaman and amateur painter Thomas Ruckle, who served in Sterett's 5th Maryland Regiment

When war broke out between the US and Britain, Sterett commanded the 5th Maryland Regiment, a so-called "dandy regiment" which was composed of around 500 men, mostly volunteers raised from the City of Baltimore. The 5th first saw action at the Battle of Bladensburg on August 24, 1814, where the regiment was placed in the first line of defense, and where the defending Americans would be routed by the British.

Pressed by the British attack, some of the militia units broke under fire and fell back, leaving the 5th exposed to the full weight of the British army. Sterett's men "gallantly" held their ground, briefly pushing the British back, but the 5th was soon outflanked by advancing British troops and Brigadier General Tobias Stansbury soon ordered a full retreat. Although the 5th had "evinced a disposition to make a gallant resistance", it was outflanked by the British and eventually forced to retreat in some disorder. After the battle, British forces entered Washington and burned several government buildings in the city.

=== Battle of North Point ===
Sterett's men also performed with great credit on September 12 at the Battle of North Point which, while tactically a defeat for the Americans, bought valuable time to organise the successful defense of Baltimore. As the British advanced, some of the militia regiments broke under fire, but the 5th Maryland Regiment and the 27th held their ground and were able to retreat in good order, having inflicted significant casualties on advancing British troops.

Corporal John McHenry of the 5th Regiment wrote an account of the battle:

Our Regiment, the 5th, carried off the praise from the other regiments engaged, so did the company to which I have the honor to belong cover itself with glory. When compared to the [other] Regiments we were the last that left the ground... had our Regiment not retreated at the time it did we should have been cut off in two minutes.

After the battle Sterett retreated to his plantation, which was nearby, and made arrangements to remove his family from Mount Deposit to a place of greater safety. Sterett's estate, described by a British officer as "a mansion of considerable size and genteel exterior", was occupied by a group of British soldiers and sailors, who began to damage the house after failing to find any food. This led them to discover its wine cellar, and soon "not a single pint either of wine or spirits remained".

After North Point, Sterett took up a defensive position on Hampstead Hill along with his regiment, and awaited the British attack. The following naval bombardment of Baltimore was not able to break the city's defences, and the British, perceiving the Americans to be "entrenched in the most formidable manner, having covered the whole face of the heights with breastworks", eventually withdrew without risking a land assault.

== Death and legacy ==
Sterett was regarded by his colleagues as a brave and reliable soldier. He died in 1821, and was succeeded as lieutenant colonel of the 5th Regiment by George H. Steuart who had been a captain serving under him at Bladensberg and North Point.
