= Up the Road with Sallie =

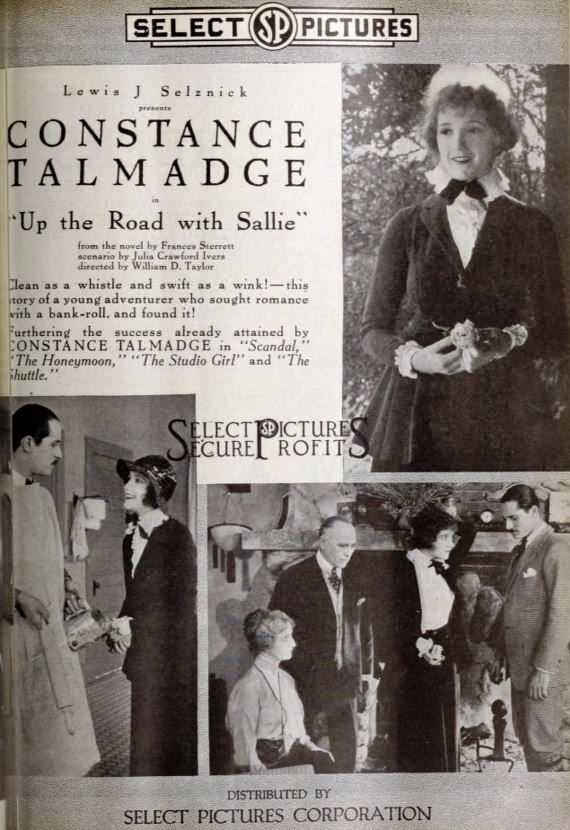
- advertisement
- Directed by: William Desmond Taylor
- Written by: Julia Crawford Ivers
- Based on: the novel Up the Road with Sallie by Frances Roberta Sterrett
- Produced by: Lewis J. Selznick
- Starring: Constance Talmadge; Norman Kerry
- Cinematography: Frank E. Garbutt; Homer Scott
- Distributed by: Select Pictures
- Release date: April 1918
- Running time: 50 minutes
- Country: USA
- Language: Silent..English intertitles

Up the Road with Sallie is a surviving 1918 silent film comedy-romance directed by William Desmond Taylor and starring Constance Talmadge. It was produced by Lewis J. Selznick and released through his Select Picture Corporation. It is preserved in the UCLA Film and Television Archive.

== Cast ==
- Constance Talmadge - Sallie Waters
- Norman Kerry - Joshua Cabot II, alias Smith Jones
- Kate Toncray - Martha Cabot
- Thomas Persse - John Henderson, alias John Johnson
- Karl Formes - Judge Joshua Cabot
- M. B. Paanakker - Richard Cabot

== Critical appraisal ==
Up the Road With Sallie is “typical of many unpretentious but entertaining features” that in the silent era ran about an hour (typically of 4-or 5-reel productions). Film historian Charles Hopkins of the UCLA Film and Television Archive remarks:

“Sallie is notable on two counts: for a sparking performance by leading lady Talmadge (best remembered today as the Mountain Girl in the Babylonian sequence Griffith’s Intolerance (1916) and as a rare surviving film by William Desmond Taylor, whose unsolved 1922 murder ended the career of Mary Miles Minter...”

== Sources ==
- Hopkins, Charles. Up the Road with Sallie, 1916. UCLA Film and Television Archive: 12th Festival of Preservation, July 22-August 21, 2004. Festival guest handbook.
