= John Stricker =

United States general (1759–1825)

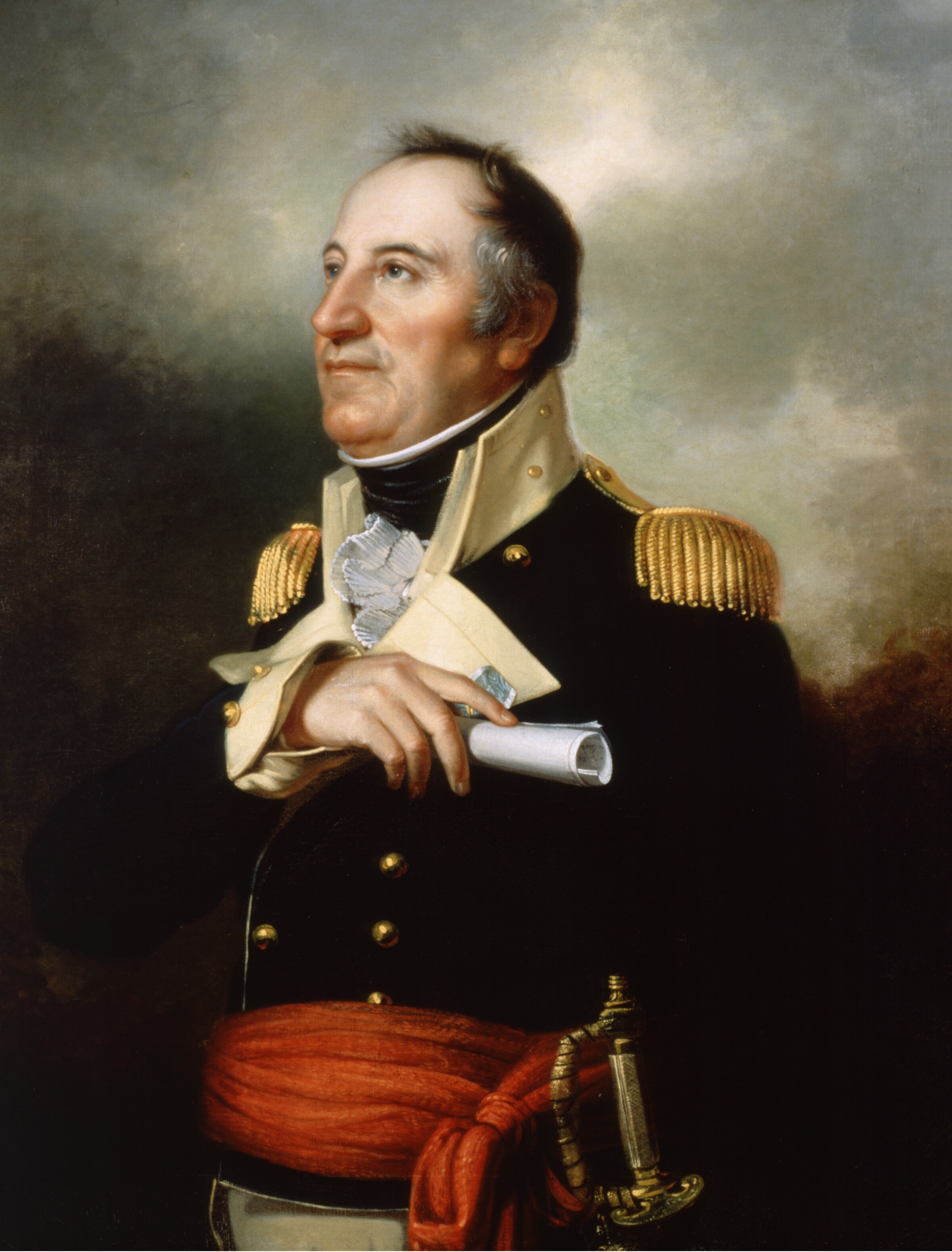
- Portrait by Rembrandt Peale, c. 1817–1818
- Born: February 15, 1759; Frederick, Maryland, British America
- Died: June 23, 1825 (aged 66); Baltimore, Maryland, U.S.
- Burial place: Westminster Hall and Burying Ground, Baltimore
- Military career
- Allegiance: United States of America; Maryland
- Branch: Continental Army; United States Army; Maryland State Militia
- Service years: 1775–1783, 1812–1815
- Rank: Brigadier General
- Commands: Third Brigade ("City Brigade" or "Baltimore Brigade"), Third Division, Maryland State Militia
- Conflicts: American Revolutionary War; Battle of Princeton; Battle of Brandywine; Battle of Monmouth; War of 1812; Battle of North Point; Battle of Baltimore

Brigadier General John Stricker (February 15, 1759 – June 23, 1825) was a Maryland state militia officer who fought in both the American Revolutionary War in the First Maryland Regiment of the famous "Maryland Line" of the Continental Army and in the War of 1812.

During the latter war, Stricker commanded the Third Brigade (also known as the "City Brigade" or the "Baltimore Brigade") of the Maryland state militia in the Battle of North Point on Monday, September 12, 1814, (later known as "Defenders' Day, a state, county and city holiday) which formed a part of the larger Battle of Baltimore, along with the subsequent British naval bombardment of Fort McHenry on September 13-14th, and was a turning point in the later months of the War of 1812 and to the peace negotiators across the Atlantic Ocean for the Treaty of Ghent, in the city of Ghent then in the Austrian Netherlands, (now of future Belgium), which finally arrived at a peace treaty on Christmas Eve of December 1814, of which news finally reached America in February 1815.

== Early life and Revolutionary War ==
Stricker was born on February 15, 1759, in Frederick, Province of Maryland. He was the son of Colonel George Stricker, who served during the Revolutionary War. The younger Stricker served as a cadet under his father's command, in the 1st Maryland Regiment, commanded by Gen. William Smallwood. He was present at the Battles of Princeton (January 3, 1777) in New Jersey, Brandywine (September 11, 1777), in Pennsylvania, and Monmouth (June 28, 1778), (also New Jersey - last battle of the Revolutionary War in the Northern Theatre).

He later became a banker and financier in the quickly growing third largest city then in America, beside joining and becoming a state militia officer.

== Battle of North Point ==
On September 12, 1814, a British force of around 9,000 men was landed at North Point in southeastern Baltimore County in Maryland, west of the Chesapeake Bay aiming to march upon and capture the city of Baltimore and its maritime port of Fells Point. Stricker, as Brigadier General and commander of the Third Brigade (also known as the "City Brigade" or the "Baltimore Brigade") of the Maryland state militia, was ordered by Maj. Gen. Samuel Smith (commander of the Maryland and Baltimore militia and some U.S. Army regular units) to delay the British advance up the "Patapsco Neck" peninsula, in order to buy enough time to complete the building of defensive fortifications around the eastern side Baltimore on Loudenschlager's Hill and adjacent Potter's Hill (also later known as "Hampstead Hill", today's western slope of Patterson Park).

The Fifth Regiment of the Maryland state militia, of mostly Baltimore City troops, commanded by Lt. Col. Joseph Sterrett, having already been bloodied a month earlier at the infamous Battle of Bladensburg, on the northeast outskirts of Washington, D.C. in Bladensburg of Prince George's County, was now assigned the task of holding the right flank of the American armed forces, and withstood two hours of Congreve rocket fire and artillery before eventually being ordered to fall back to the newly constructed line of trenches to the east outside Baltimore on Hampstead Hill. The British Army, many of whom were veterans of the recently concluded Napoleonic Wars, were surprised by the strong resistance of these Maryland Militiamen, unlike their earlier experience at Bladensburg and, having taken around 300 casualties, they withdrew and stayed on the eastern flank of the battlefield near an old Methodist meeting house to tend to their wounded and recoup after the previous morning's sniper shooting of their commanding General Robert Ross, by American sharpshooters/snipers. Command was assumed by Col. Arthur Brooke of the 44th Regiment of Foot, as the American militia withdrew later that afternoon in good order back up the "Patapsco Neck" peninsula to the eastern outskirts of the city and the heavily-prepared Hampstead Hill fortifications.

The successful defense of Baltimore was an important boost to American morale and directly contributed to the end of the War of 1812 and reinforcing the hands of the American peace negotiators against the British diplomats at the Treaty of Ghent, in the neutral city of Ghent, in Flanders, then part of the Austrian Netherlands, (in future Belgium).

As of 2025, the 1st Battalion of the 175th Infantry Regiment in the Maryland Army National Guard carries on the lineage and tradition of the old traditional Fifth Maryland Regiment, long traditionally known as "The Dandy Fifth".

== Family life ==
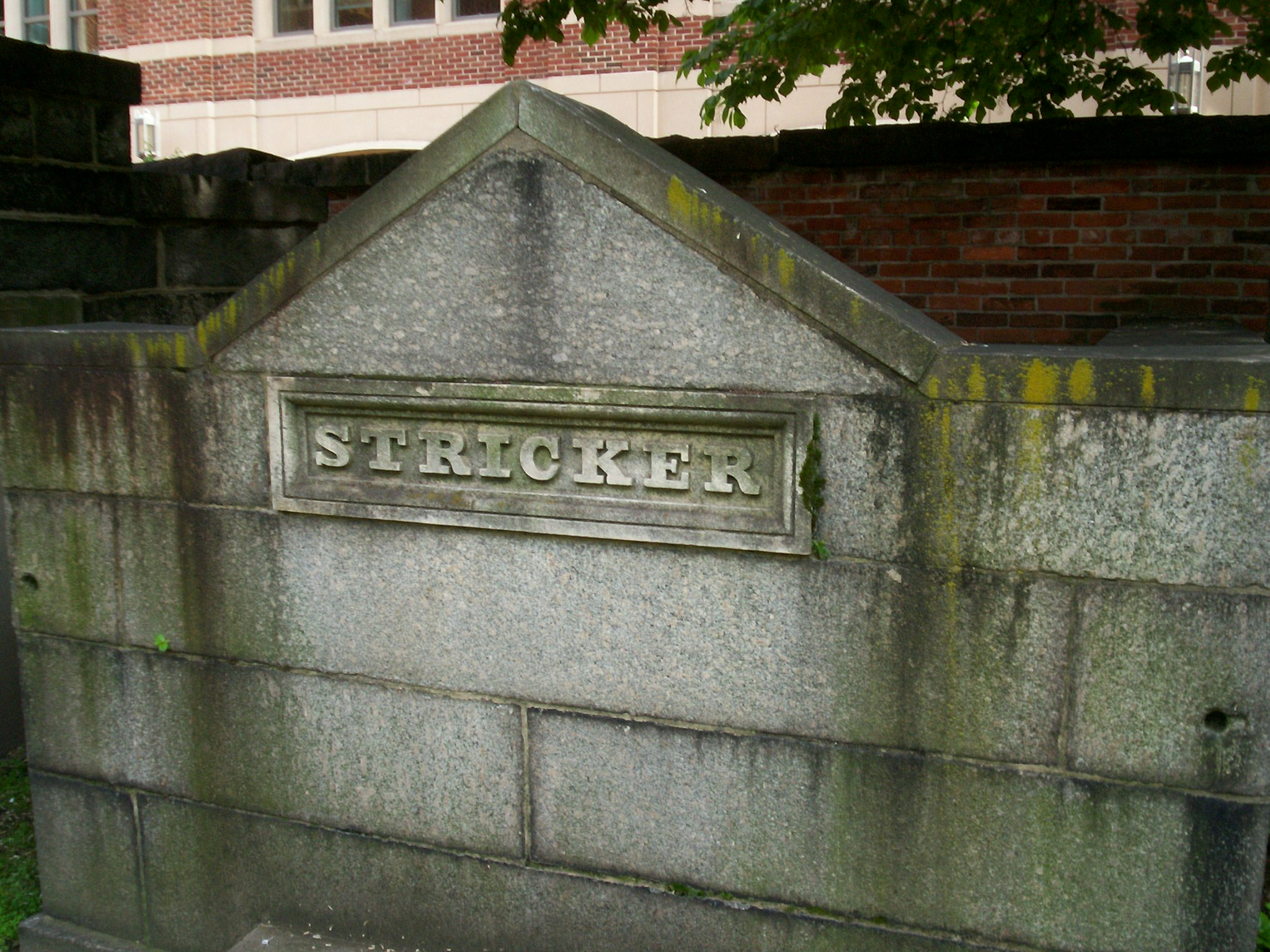
Grave at Westminster Hall and Burying Ground, (later site of Westminster Presbyterian Church built over a portion of the burial ground), North Greene and West Fayette Streets.

Stricker married Martha Bedford (1763–1816), daughter of Gunning Bedford, of Philadelphia, in 1783. They had six daughters and a son:

- Mary (1784–1851)
- Catherine (1786–1860)
- Ann Eliza (1789–1843)
- Julianna (1797-?)
- Charlotte (1798–1826)
- Laura (1805–1877)
- John (1800–1837).

General Stricker is buried at Westminster Hall and Burying Ground, the old Western Burying Grounds of the First Presbyterian Church (later became the Westminster Presbyterian Church which surmounted the cemetery) at North Greene and West Fayette Streets in western downtown Baltimore.

== See also ==
- Battle of North Point
- Battle of Baltimore
