= Frances Roberta Sterrett =

American writer

Frances Roberta Sterrett (1869–1947) was a writer. The 1918 film Up the Road with Sallie was adapted from her novel.

Her book The Jam Girl was praised for being clever and offering "laughing insight." Another review praised it as a "jolly little farce". Her book These Young Rebels was also praised for its hunor.

Her book William and Williamina is about a recluse who encounters a wayward little girl.

She wrote the short story "A Rich Man's Son".

== Writings ==
- The Jam Girl (1914)
- Up the Road with Sallie (1915)
- Mary Rose of Mifflin (1916)
- William and Williamina (1917)
- Jimmie the sixth (1918)
- Rebecca's Promise (1919)
- Nancy Goes to Town (1920)
- These Young Rebels (1921)
- The Amazing Inheritance (1922)
- Rusty of the Tall Pines
- Rusty the High Towers (1929), a children's book
- Rusty of the Mountain Peaks
- Rusty of the Meadow Lands
- The Golden Stream
- Years of Achievement
