= Sterritt =

Sterritt is a surname. Notable people with the surname include:

- Angela Sterritt, Canadian journalist
- Coleen Sterritt (born 1953), American artist
- David Sterritt (born 1944), American film critic
- Lorraine Sterritt, Irish-American academic administrator

== See also ==
- Sterrett, surname
