= Defenders Day (Maryland) =

State holiday in Maryland, US

- Observed by: Maryland
- Type: Local, Historical
- Significance: Anniversary of the successful defense of the city of Baltimore from an invading British military force during the War of 1812.
- Date: September 12
- Next time: September 12, 2027
- Frequency: annual

Defenders Day is a longtime legal holiday on September 12, in the U.S. state of Maryland, in the City of Baltimore and surrounding Baltimore County. It commemorates the successful defense of the city of Baltimore on September 12-13-14, 1814 from an invading British force during the War of 1812, an event which led to the writing of a poem, which when set to music a few days later, became known as "The Star-Spangled Banner", which in 1931 was designated as the national anthem of the United States.

== Origin ==
In September 1814, following the burning of Washington three weeks earlier, a British military force of King's Army commanded by Major General Robert Ross, (1766-1814), landed at North Point (near present-day Fort Howard, Maryland) on the Patapsco Neck peninsula in southeastern Baltimore County and began an advance on the city from the southeast. They were met almost immediately by advance scouts and skirmishers ahead of a detachment from the Baltimore City Third Brigade of the Maryland state militia commanded by Brigadier General John Stricker, (1759-1825), commencing the Battle of North Point. Major General Samuel Smith, (1752-1839), of the Maryland Militia was in overall command of the city's defenses and had sent Stricker forward to probe and slow up the enemy, who just happened to be falling into a trap, facing a series of pre-planned defensive lines dug over the previous year, landing precisely where Smith had expected them to be. After the bloodying and stalwart defense of six regiments, the Americans slowly withdrew back towards town, with the resulting halt of the larger British force to lick their wounds and tend to casualties overnight. This also allowed Baltimore to further organize its eastern dug-in fortifications on Loudenschlager's, Potter's Hills (modern site of Patterson Park) and harbor defenses against a later bombardment and attempted naval barge invasion. It was during this conflict, the Battle of Baltimore, that Fort McHenry was shelled by the British Royal Navy's revolutionary newly constructed bomb and mortar ketches warships. Although the attacking fleet stayed out of the shorter range of McHenry's artillery, the Americans refused to surrender, and inspired Maryland lawyer and amateur poet from Frederick named Francis Scott Key, (1779-1843), after witnessing the two days' attack with two companions from an American truce ship anchored and guarded along the sidelines of the enemy fleet. Key composed a four stanza poem entitled "The Defence of Fort McHenry" to what later became "The Star-Spangled Banner", when set a few days later to a musical tune popular with an old English gentlemen's society from the 18th century. It gained increasing popularity over the next 117 years, accepted by American armed forces bands by the 1890s and eventually proclaimed the national anthem of the United States by act of Congress, signed by the President, Herbert Hoover in 1931.

== History ==
=== Early years ===
Commemorations of the day of the victory, centering on Stricker's stand east of the city, began in the years shortly after the War. During the mid-19th century, Marylanders picnicked on the battlefield grounds, and later celebrations involved the entire city of Baltimore, with parades and speeches.

Initially, the commemoration of Defenders Day was divided between the two sites; one focusing on the Battle of North Point and the other on "The Star-Spangled Banner" and the bombardment of Fort McHenry. The development of the holiday followed the evolution of the local state militia units. The first phase was the transition from the involuntary militia system that existed prior to the War of 1812 to the Voluntary militia system that emerged during the war period itself. The second phase was the development of the Voluntary Militia into the local parochial political-militia-business alliance that peaked with dominance of the Know Nothing (American Party) with its third party politics just prior to the American Civil War. The third was the transition from parochial patriotism to national patriotism during the Civil War. Finally in the fourth phase, after the Civil War, the local militia disappeared (later reorganized into state National Guard with divided state and Federal authority / command structure by the 1880s) and the local parochial patriotic military units traditions were largely forgotten or replaced with new national patriotic ideas and traditions.

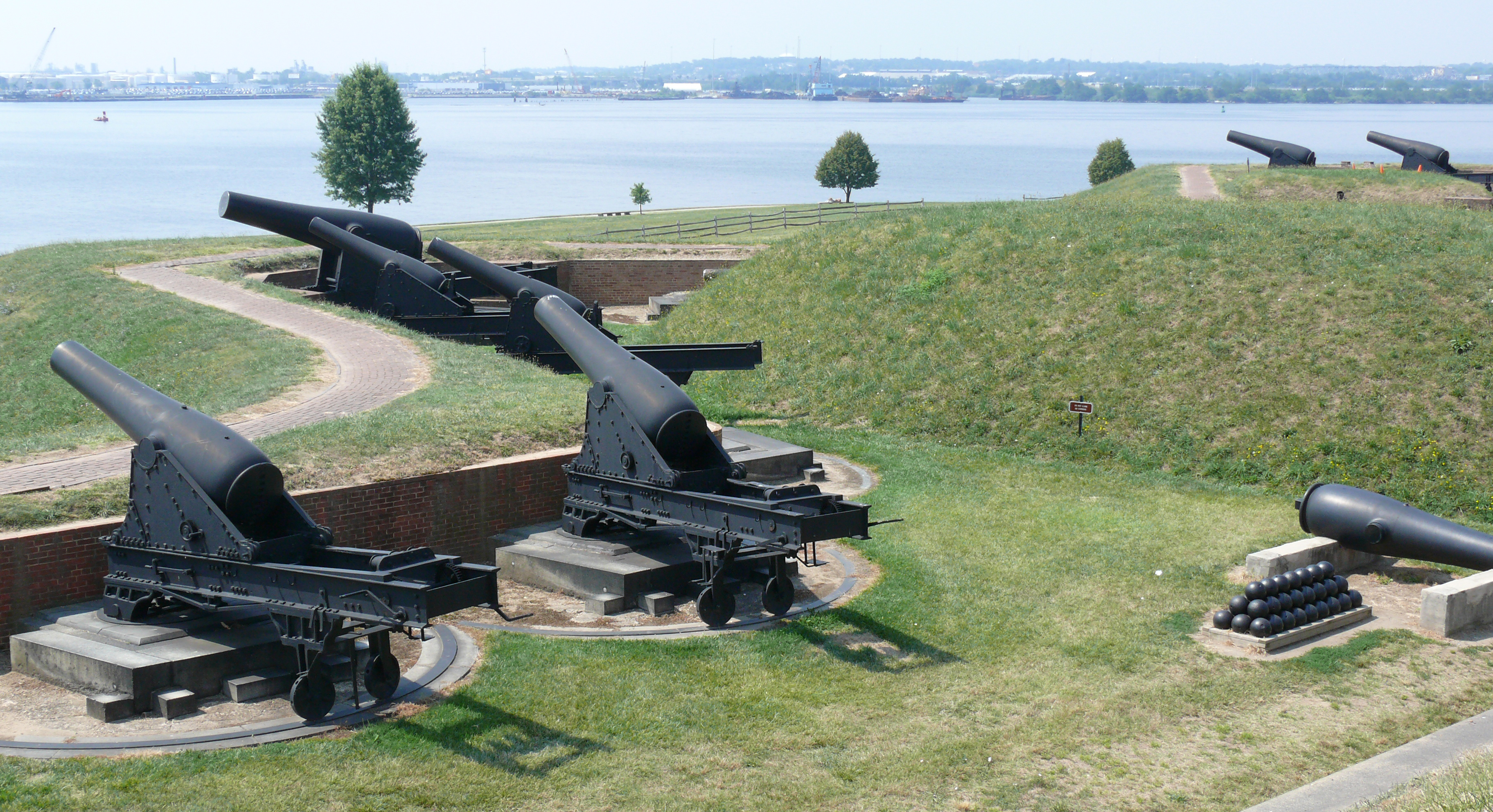
The cannons of Ft. McHenry guarding Baltimore harbor

In the first phase the local militia viewed the national government as allies. During the second the parochial political-militia-business alliance viewed the national government with increasing hostility, as expressed by the Maryland state anthem "Maryland, My Maryland", written after civil strife ("Pratt Street Riots") on Baltimore streets at the beginning of the Civil War in April 1861. During the second phase, the myth and lore of Defender's Day were used to support parochial Nativism (politics). In the third phase the parochial nationalism and nativism of the pre-Civil War militia disappeared since those groups had moved to South Carolina or later Virginia to enlist and join individually or the Maryland southerner regiments in the Confederate States Army. In the fourth phase, nativism returned with the former Confederate veterans and after a struggle between the militias, formed from the Union veterans and their rival militias formed from Confederate veterans, the post Civil War militias were replaced by the creation of the Maryland National Guard. The replacement of the state militias by the National Guard also produced a replacement of the politics and cultural traditions that supported the militias. Hence, the commemoration of the Battle of North Point declined in favor of the celebration of "The Star-Spangled Banner".

The North Point celebrations focused on local parochial politics. These celebrations centered on the "Old Defenders" (the veterans of the Battle of North Point). The celebrations emphasized how the "Defenders" had stood against the British invader after the federal government had failed and Washington was burned. The Fort McHenry celebrations focused on the image of the federal fortifications providing the bastion that saved the nation.

While the "Old Defenders" survived, the commemorations of Defenders Day revolved around them and the early local Baltimore veterans organizations formed which soon led and participated in national 1812 War societies. Following the War of 1812, many of the "Old Defenders" had become civic leaders in Baltimore. The traditional program while the "Old Defenders" survived was for "Defenders' Day" programs that started with a rally and speeches at Baltimore's Battle Monument, the landmark memorial in the former colonial era courthouse square along North Calvert Street, between East Lexington and East Fayette Streets. Following the speeches, the militia units marched from the Battle Monument either out on Eastern Avenue then south on old North Point Road into the county to the battlefield at North Point or took a steamship excursion from "The Basin" (today's Inner Harbor) of the Northwest Branch of the Patapsco River downriver and up Bear Creek. At North Point, the militia units participated in a sham battle, and then march to the former Loudenschlager's Hill (now Hampstead Hill, in what is now Patterson Park in the Highlandtown-Canton communities of East Baltimore). Hampstead Hill was the location of the final redoubts that stopped the British advance on the city. The march and the sham battle were intended to replicate the events of the Battle of North Point and the troop movements to and from there. One of the unfortunate results of this schedule for the commemoration of "Defenders' Day" was that more militia died from heat stroke and exhaustion, from the march to and from the old battlefield, and the occasional musket ball fired during the sham battle at the battlefield, than died during the actual battle. The commemoration in 1822 proved to be exceptionally lethal. An unusually hot September and dress parade heavy wool uniforms produced a significant loss due to heat stroke, resulting in a one-year break in the program.

The occasional musket balls fired during the sham battle produced additional fatalities. In the years following one notable fatality, a new tradition appeared in Baltimore's daily newspapers that lasted until the Civil War; just prior to "Defenders' Day" perennial advertisements appeared in the Baltimore newspapers stating: "now available - blank ammunition.".

Prior to the Civil War, the "Defenders' Day" speeches held that the Battle of Baltimore to be the most noble battle in U.S. military history. The Battle of Baltimore was entirely defensive and was fought by the citizens themselves. Notable examples are the speeches given by One of the "Old Defender's" Nathaniel Williams on September 12, 1857. A monument, a play, and ballads to the two soldiers credited with killing Major General Robert Ross, Pvts. Daniel Wells, such as "The Boy Martyrs of Sept. 12, 1814: A Local Historical Drama", were typical of this period. Today, numerous monuments to the War of 1812 remain throughout "The Monumental City" (the designation of Baltimore as "The Monumental City" was made by sixth President John Quincy Adams in 1827, during a toast at a civic banquet).

In 1854, a committee gathered on the fortieth anniversary with the notion of erecting a monument to Wells and McComas. On September 10, 1858, after securing and investing the funds for the project, the bodies of the teen militiamen were exhumed and placed in the old Maryland Institute (then located above Centre Market - or "Marsh Market" on East Baltimore Street at the west bank of the Jones Falls in Market Place). Thousands of people visited the coffins during the three days leading up to September 12, the anniversary of the Battle of North Point, when the official cornerstone for the memorial was laid. On that day, the bodies of Wells and McComas were paraded to Ashland Square, (near the intersection of North Gay, Monument, and Aisquith Streets in East Baltimore), the site of interment, and placed below the obelisk's foundation in ceremonial fashion.

The Wells and McComas Monument is currently used as the emblem on the embroidered shoulder patches on the uniforms of sheriff deputies for the surrounding rural (now suburban) Baltimore County Sheriff's Office.

=== The Secession Crisis ===
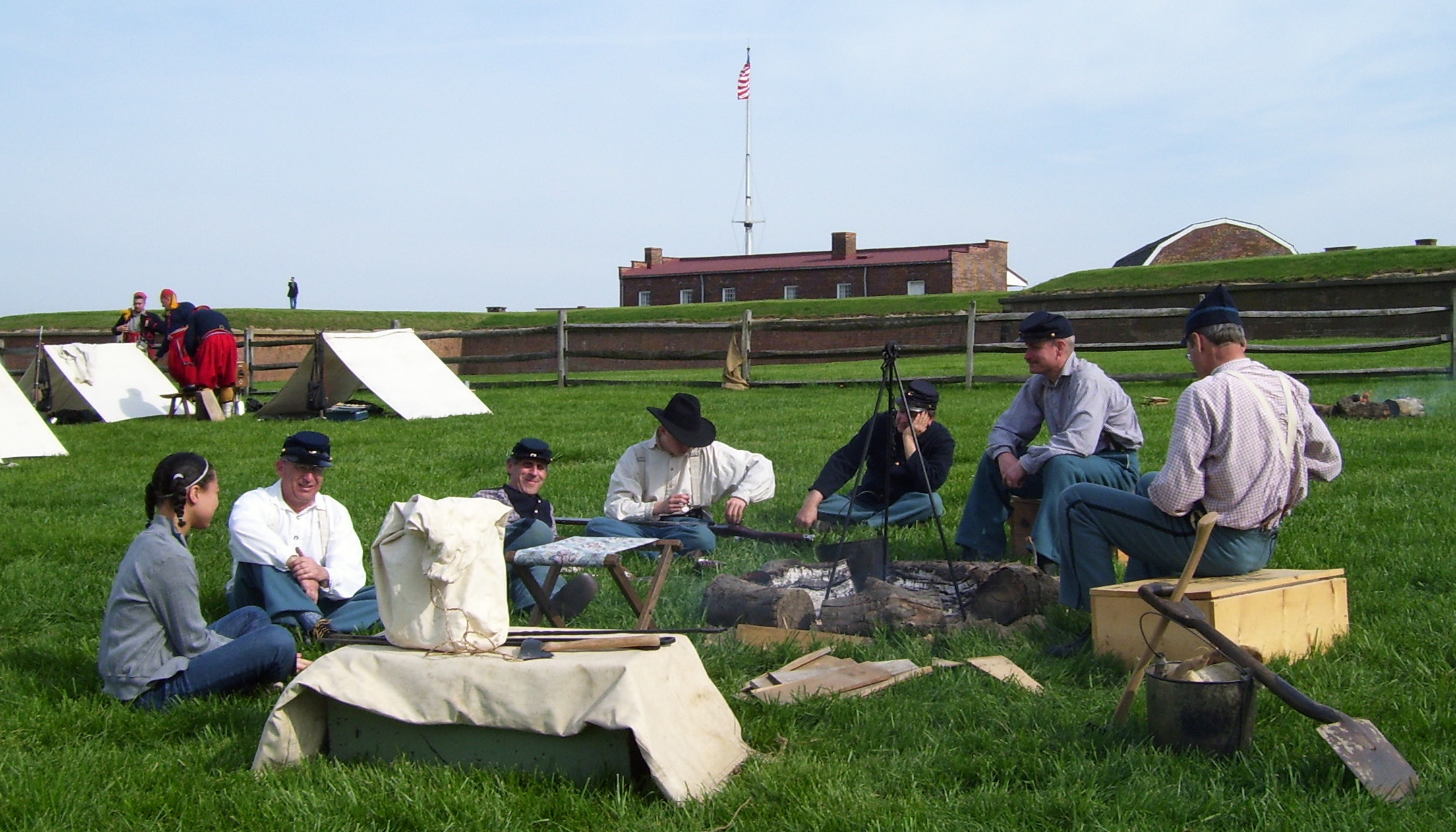
An American Civil War reenactment at Fort McHenry

As documented in The Baltimore Sun, in articles written in September 1860, the Secession Crisis prior to the November 1860 election caused a change in the Defenders' Day program. The federal troops that were stationed at Fort McHenry were deployed to the Mexican border leaving Fort McHenry empty, except for an old sergeant serving as a custodian. This was a product of the administration of James Buchanan's Secretary of War Jefferson Davis, Buchanan was one of the "Old Defenders", having been one of the Pennsylvania Militia at the fort during the Battle of Baltimore and Davis would go on to become the president of the Confederate States of America. Seeing the opportunity, if not by plan, one of the Baltimore city secessionist militia units, the 5th Maryland Regiment ("Dandy Fifth"), planned to seize the fort on Defenders' Day, September 12, 1860. The plot was discovered, an anti-secessionist militia unit (elements of the 53rd Maryland) rowed in the darkness from Fells Point to the fort the night before Defenders' Day. The 5th Maryland departed from the grounds of the Baltimore Excelsiors baseball club near Bolton Hill, but instead of turning to march to the Battle Monument, turned to march on the fort. When the 5th reached the fort they found it already occupied by the 53rd. Thereby the secessionist militia from one part of the city lost the race to the fort to a pro-Union militia unit from another part of the city. The result was a non-violent standoff that was resolved when the secessionist militia marched back to its neighborhood and the conflict was over, to be repeated in the later Secession Crisis that followed the presidential election of 1860, the crisis reached its highest point after the armed 6th Massachusetts Regiment and unarmed "Washington Brigade" and musical band of Philadelphia of their respective state militias were attacked by a southern secessionist armed mob of thousands along President, Pratt and Howard Streets as they first moved along in horse-pulled railroad cars, then marched between the President Street Station of the Philadelphia, Wilmington and Baltimore Railroad on the east side of downtown to the Camden Street Station of the Baltimore and Ohio Railroad on the southwest side to continue on the rail line to get to Washington, D.C. to defend the national capital from recently seceded Virginia on Friday, April 19, 1861. The same units that attempted to prevent the movement of Federalized state militia troops through Baltimore were involved in the earlier demonstration at Fort McHenry. The secessionist unit that featured most prominently on both occasions were the "Baltimore Law Greys" of the 5th Maryland. The Law Greys as part of Baltimore's First Light Division, Maryland Volunteers were disbanded in Baltimore and reformed in Virginia as the 1st Maryland Infantry Regiment, C.S.A.

The move away from the Battle of North Point to Fort McHenry was suggested by the "Old Defenders" themselves when they met at Govanstown, Maryland (today's Govans city neighborhood along Greenmount Avenue/York Road, Maryland Route 45) for their annual dinner to celebrate the Defenders' Day during the Civil War. The choice of the "Old Defenders" to do this was made as an open appeal to heal the wounds of the Civil War. The "Old Defenders" noted that troops from surrounding towns and counties in Pennsylvania, Maryland and Virginia had rallied to Baltimore and Fort McHenry during the 1814 Battle of Baltimore.

Nativism returned with the Confederate veterans after the Civil War. After the Civil War the militia in Baltimore was divided between Union veterans and initially illegal militias of Confederate veterans. Prior to the 1877 riots the Confederate militia was legalized as the 5th Maryland. Baltimore's militia on the eve of the nationwide labor strife and riots in July 1877, the Great Railroad Strike of 1877 was composed of the 4th, 5th and 6th Maryland militia regiments. The former Confederate 5th Maryland being drawn from veterans of the 1st Maryland C.S.A., the 6th Maryland being composed of Union Army veterans and the 4th Maryland of indeterminate origins. Each militia unit had its headquarters and armory close to one of the large railroad stations.

The 5th Regiment Armory above the old Richmond Market at North Howard, West Read & West Biddle Streets, near the old Bolton Station of the Northern Central Railway, the 6th Regiment across the street from the old Phoenix Shot Tower, at East Fayette and North Front Streets, north of the President Street Station of the Philadelphia, Wilmington and Baltimore Railroad and the 4th Regiment at Camden Street Station, headquarters of the Baltimore and Ohio Railroad. During the riot the 6th was attacked by an armed mob and fought its way west on Baltimore Street, the 6th broke and was chased by the mob through the downtown streets, and the 6th's armory was attacked and the remaining militia driven from their armory. The 6th Maryland was disbanded several years later and the unit blamed for all police and militia violence against the rioters. Governor John Lee Carroll then declared that the designation of "6th Maryland" be forever stricken from the Maryland militia rolls. This left the formerly Confederate 5th Maryland as the dominant militia in Baltimore, thereby shaping how Defenders' Day was commemorated until the outbreak of World War I.

The post-Civil War nativism peaked just after the Great Railroad Strike of 1877 and then slowly faded with the growing popularity of the "Star-Spangled Banner" as the U.S. Army and U.S. Navy unofficially adopted the song to be played at all military functions in the 1890s. The demise of the 6th Maryland and the ascendency of the 5th Maryland can be viewed as part of the national political changes ending the Reconstruction Era of the United States and the Compromise of 1877.

Nativism was dealt a decisive blow with the establishment of the National Guard of the United States since the creation of the National Guard effectively removed the local state militia as an active muscular component of local politics.

A famous photograph from the early 1880s, shows one of the last reunions of "The Old Defenders" as a group of a half-dozen old be-whiskered gentlemen, garbed in black cut-away coats, cravat ties and top hats with gold-knobbed canes sitting on chairs in front of the steps of the old historic "Druid Hill" mansion, once the estate of one of their notable officers, then the headquarters of Druid Hill Park, established in 1860.

=== 20th century and the present ===
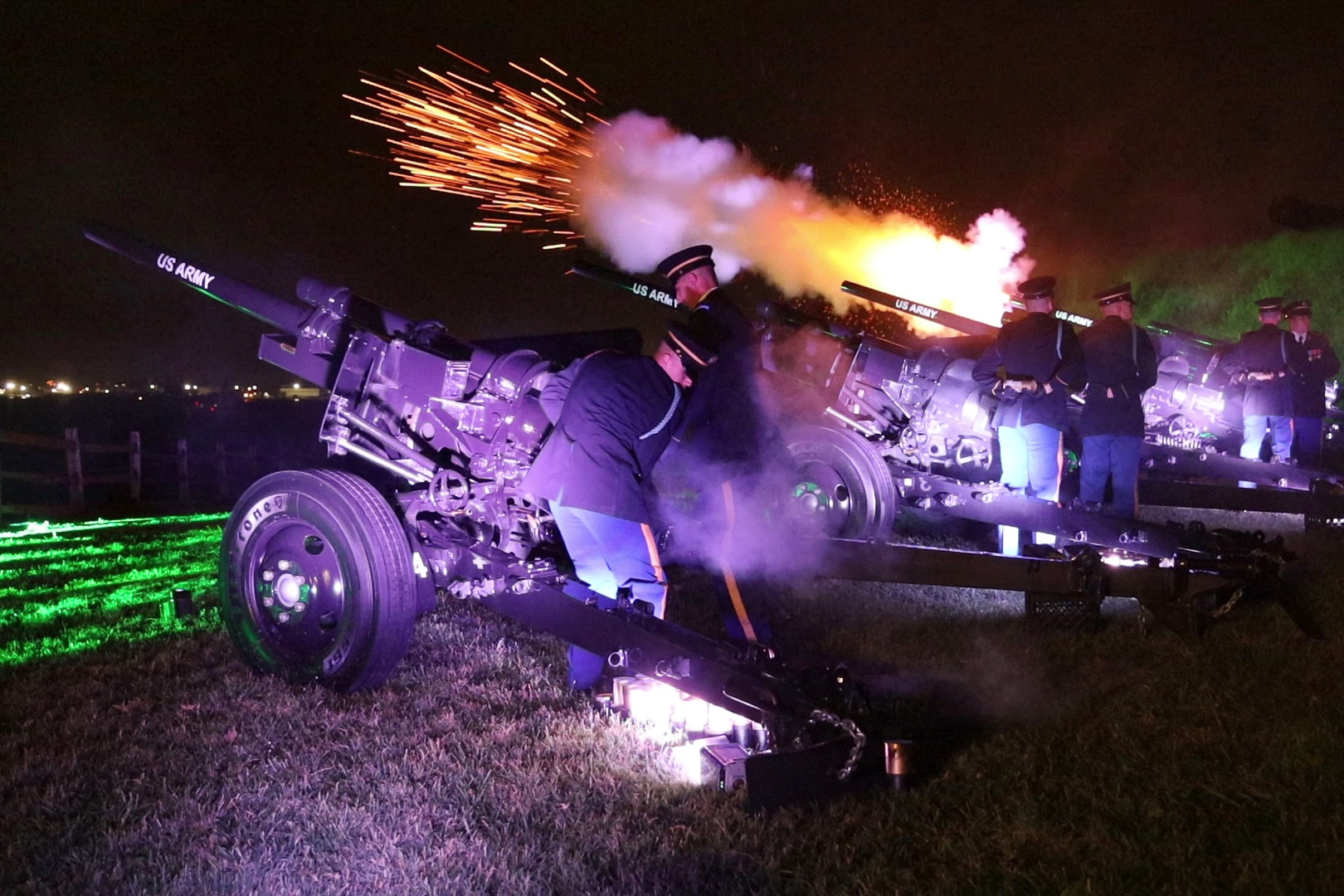
Members of the 3rd U.S. Infantry Regiment participating in a Defenders Day performance at Fort McHenry, 2019

After the Spanish–American War of 1898, the expansion of Baltimore's harbor defenses included building/three additional fortified posts in the outer harbor of the lower Patapsco River. These were Fort Howard on North Point and moving the garrison from Fort McHenry to Fort Howard. In addition, on the southern shores of the harbor, in Anne Arundel County, Fort Armistead was constructed on Hawkins Point to the south, and further south was smaller Fort Smallwood at Rock Point. The City of Baltimore began a campaign that eventually led to Fort McHenry being acquired by the city as a park, held briefly from 1914 to 1917, before being requisitioned again by the Army in 1918 for use as the nation's largest military hospital for World War I returning casualties. Before the temporary transition of Fort McHenry to the City of Baltimore, the last of the "Old Defenders" died in the 1880s and the task of maintaining the traditions of Defender's Day passed to the General Society of the War of 1812 in Maryland, which now was composed of sons and grandsons along with the companion heritage society United States Daughters of 1812. This also coincided with the creation of the National Guard and the dissolution of the old militia units.

The largest celebration was held on the fabled and elaborate "National Star-Spangled Banner Centennial Celebration" for the one hundredth anniversary for a week in September 1914, which included memorial monuments, statuary and bronze plaques erected, pageants, exhibits, parades, fireworks with reenacting of the shelling of Fort McHenry and the legendary dressing of thousands of school children in red-white-blue colors for a "Living Flag" display. The National Star-Spangled Banner Centennial was however overshadowed by the outbreak of the "Great War" World War I in Europe, the month before after nearly a century of peace on the continent.

The dedication of the statue along the entrance driveway (later relocated to another spot further from the historic Star Fort), shortly after the temporary military hospital buildings had been razed and the grounds restored to a park-like scene, at Fort McHenry of "Orpheus with the Awkward Foot" by 29th president Warren G. Harding sealed the prominence of the "Star Fort" in future Defenders' Day observances. The completion of the Orpheus statue at Fort McHenry further emphasized the story of the writing of the "Star-Spangled Banner" following the bombardment of the fort by British naval forces, instead of the commemoration of Battle of North Point and Baltimore's Battle Monument.

The Great Depression of the 1930s curtailed the celebrations somewhat, and they continued to wane in popularity through World War II and the 1960s, when dissatisfaction with martial matters caused by the unpopular Vietnam War were noted. It was not until the 1980s and 1990s that Defenders' Day began to be widely celebrated in Maryland once again, mostly through the increasing popularity of the Fort McHenry Guard, volunteer reenactor soldiers for the National Park Service, who brought new life to celebrations at Fort McHenry. Even Baltimore's then-mayor, Martin O'Malley, donned an elaborate fancily decorated War of 1812 officers uniform as a colonel of the Fort McHenry Guard to participate in Defenders' Day reenactments in 2003, which he repeated as Governor of Maryland during 200th Anniversary events in 2014, in addition to composing Irish-style musical ballads about the "Battle of Baltimore" and the War of 1812 performed by his Irish music band "O'Malley's March"!.
