= Battle of North Point =

Battle of the War of 1812

Coordinates: 39.2789°N 76.4876°W

- Part of the Battle of Baltimore and War of 1812
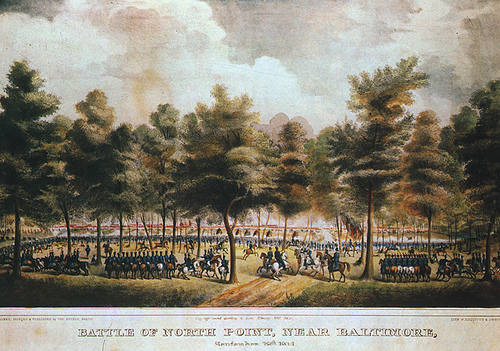
- The Battle of North Point by Thomas Ruckle
Date	September 12, 1814
Location	North Point, Maryland
Result	British victory (See aftermath)

Belligerents
United States	United Kingdom

Commanders and leaders
Samuel Smith; John Stricker	Robert Ross †; Arthur Brooke

Strength
3,200 militia and infantry	4,000–4,700 infantry and marines

Casualties and losses
24 killed 139 wounded 50 captured	39–46 killed 251–295 wounded 1 missing

The Battle of North Point was fought on September 12, 1814, between General John Stricker's Maryland Militia and a British force led by Major-general Robert Ross. Although the Americans were driven from the field, they were able to do so in good order having inflicted significant casualties on the British, killing Ross and demoralizing the troops under his command. Some of Ross's units became lost among woods and swampy creeks during the battle, with others in similar states of confusion.

This combination of setbacks prompted Colonel Arthur Brooke to delay the British advance against Baltimore, giving to the Americans valuable time so to properly prepare for the defense of the city as Stricker was retreating back to the main defenses to bolster the existing force. The engagement was a part of the larger Battle of Baltimore, an American victory in the War of 1812.

== Background ==
=== British movements ===
Major General Robert Ross had been dispatched to the Chesapeake Bay with a brigade of veterans from the Duke of Wellington's army early in 1814, reinforced with a battalion of Royal Marines. He had defeated a hastily assembled force of Maryland and District of Columbia militia at the Battle of Bladensburg on August 24, 1814, and burned Washington. Having disrupted the American government, he withdrew to the waiting ships of the Royal Navy at the mouth of the Patuxent River before heading further up the Chesapeake Bay to the strategically more important port city of Baltimore, although the Americans managed to defeat a British landing at Caulk's Field before doing so.

Ross's army of 3,700 troops and 1,000 marines landed at North Point at the end of the peninsula between the Patapsco River and the Back River on the morning of September 12, 1814, and began moving toward the city of Baltimore.

=== American defenses ===
Major General Samuel Smith of the Maryland militia anticipated the British move, and dispatched Brigadier General John Stricker's column to meet them. Stricker's force consisted of five regiments of Maryland militia, a small militia cavalry regiment from Maryland, a battalion of three volunteer rifle companies and a battery of six 4-pounder field guns. Stricker deployed his brigade halfway between Hampstead Hill, just outside Baltimore, where there were earthworks and artillery emplacements, and North Point. At that point, several tidal creeks narrowed the peninsula to only a mile wide, and it was considered an ideal spot for opposing the British before they reached the main American defensive positions.

Stricker received intelligence that the British were camped at a farm just 3 miles (4.8 km) from his headquarters. He deployed his men between Bear Creek and Bread and Cheese Creek, which offered cover from nearby woods, and had a long wooden fence near the main road. Stricker placed the 5th Maryland Regiment and the 27th Maryland Regiment and his six guns in the front defensive line, with two regiments (the 51st and 39th) in support, and one more (the 6th) in reserve. He placed his men in mutually supporting positions, relying on numerous swamps and the two streams to stop a British flank attack, all of which he hoped would help avoid another disaster such as Bladensburg.

The riflemen initially occupied a position some miles ahead of Stricker's main position, to delay the British advance. However, their commander, Captain William Dyer, hastily withdrew on hearing a rumour that British troops were landing from the Back River behind him, threatening to cut off his retreat. Stricker posted them instead on his right flank.

== Battle ==
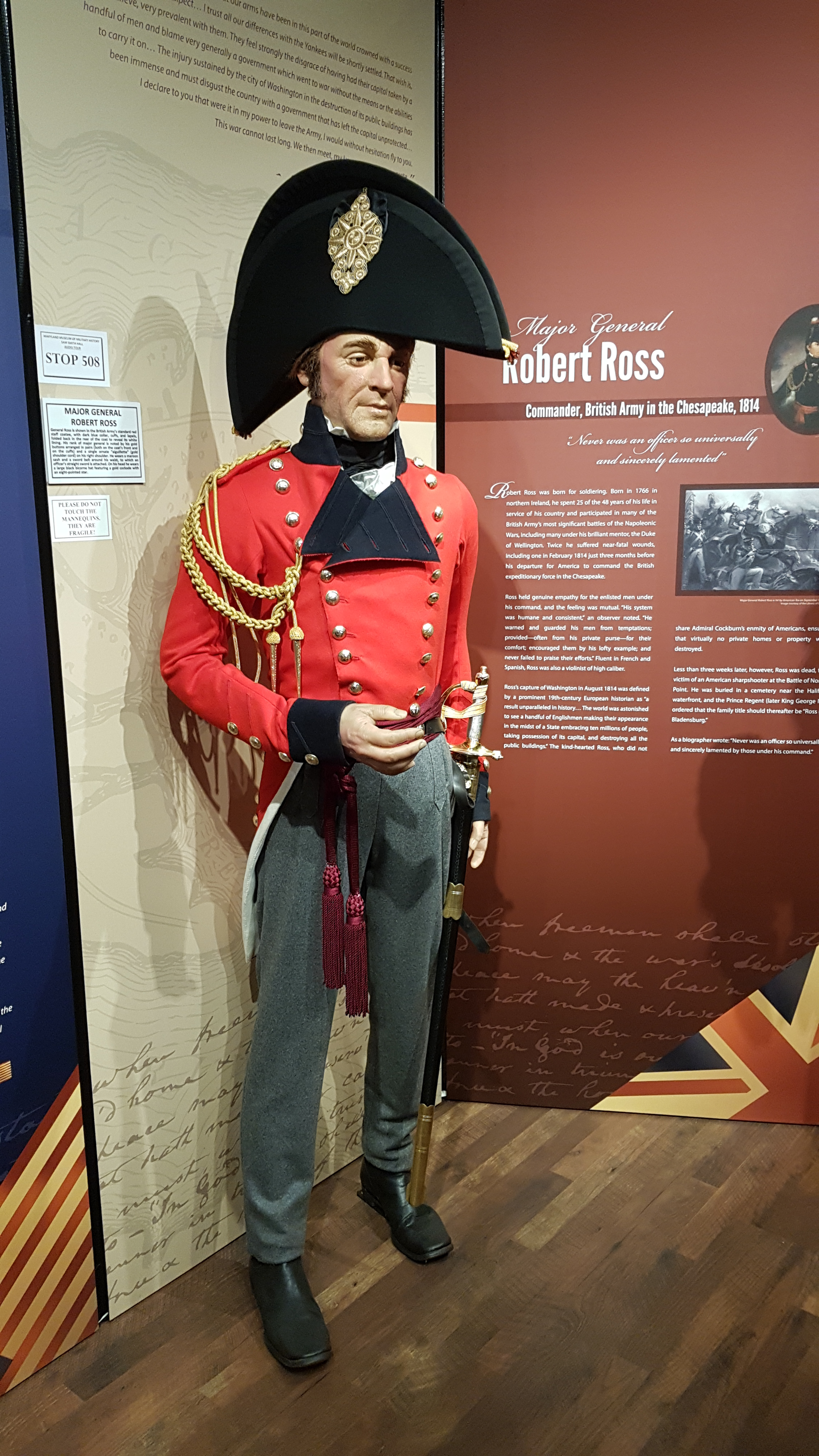
A figure of British Major General Robert Ross as he appeared in the Baltimore campaign

=== Opening skirmish ===
At about midday on the 12th, Stricker heard the British had halted while the soldiers had a meal, and some sailors attached to Ross's force plundered nearby farms. He decided it would be better to provoke a fight rather than wait for a possible British night attack. At 1:00 pm, he sent Major Richard Heath with 250 men and one cannon to draw the British to Stricker's main force.

Heath advanced down the road and soon began to engage the British pickets. When Ross heard the fighting, he quickly left his meal and ran to the scene. His men attempted to drive out the concealed American riflemen. Rear Admiral George Cockburn, second in command of the Royal Navy' American Station who usually accompanied Ross, was cautious about advancing without more support and Ross agreed that he would leave and bring back the main army. However, Ross never got the chance, as an American rifleman shot him in the chest. Mortally wounded, Ross turned command over to Colonel Arthur Brooke and died soon after.

=== Main battle ===
Brooke reorganized the British troops and prepared to assault the American positions at 3:00 pm. He decided to use his three cannon to cover an attempt by his 4th Regiment to get around the American flank, while two more regiments and the naval brigade would assault the American center. The British frontal assault took heavy casualties as the American riflemen fired into the British ranks, and lacking canister the Americans loaded their cannon with broken locks, nails and horseshoes, firing scrap metal at the British advance. Nevertheless, the British 4th Regiment managed to outflank the American positions and sent many of the American regiments fleeing. Stricker was able to conduct an organized retreat, with his men firing volleys as they continued to fall back. This proved effective, killing one of the British commanders and leaving some units lost among woods and swampy creeks, with others in confusion.

Not all the militia regiments performed with equal distinction. The 51st Regiment and some men of the 39th broke and ran under fire. However, the 5th and 27th held their ground and retreated in good order, having inflicted significant casualties on the enemy. Only one American gun was lost.

Corporal John McHenry of the 5th Regiment wrote of the battle:

Our Regiment, the 5th, carried off the praise from the other regiments engaged, so did the company to which I have the honor to belong cover itself with glory. When compared to the [other] Regiments we were the last that left the ground... had our Regiment not retreated at the time it did we should have been cut off in two minutes.

Brooke did not follow the retreating Americans. He had advanced to within a mile of the main American position, but he had suffered heavier casualties than the Americans. As it was getting dark, he chose to wait until Fort McHenry was expected to be neutralized, while Stricker withdrew to Baltimore's main defences.

== Casualties ==
The official British Army casualty report, signed by Major Henry Debbieg, gives 39 killed and 251 wounded. Of these, 28 killed and 217 wounded belonged to the British Army; 6 killed and 20 wounded belonged to the 2nd and 3rd Battalions of the Royal Marines; 4 killed and 11 wounded belonged to the contingents of Royal Marines detached from Cockburn's fleet; and 1 killed (Elias Taylor) and 3 wounded belonged to the Royal Marine Artillery. As was normal, the Royal Navy submitted a separate casualty return for the engagement, signed by Rear-Admiral Cockburn, which gives 4 sailors killed and 28 wounded but contradicts the British Army casualty report by giving 3 killed (1 and 2 from HMS Madagascar and HMS Ramillies respectively) and 15 wounded for the Royal Marines detached from the ships of the Naval fleet. A subsequent casualty return from Cochrane to the Admiralty, dated September 22, 1814, gives 6 sailors killed, 1 missing and 32 wounded, with Royal Marines casualties of 1 killed and 16 wounded. The total British losses, as officially reported, were 43 killed and 279 wounded; 42 killed and 283 wounded; or 44 killed, 287 wounded and 1 missing: depending upon which of the versions of the casualty returns was accurate. Historian Franklin R. Mullaly gives still another version of the British casualties, 46 killed and 295 wounded, despite using these same sources. The American loss was 24 killed, 139 wounded and 50 taken prisoner.

== Aftermath ==
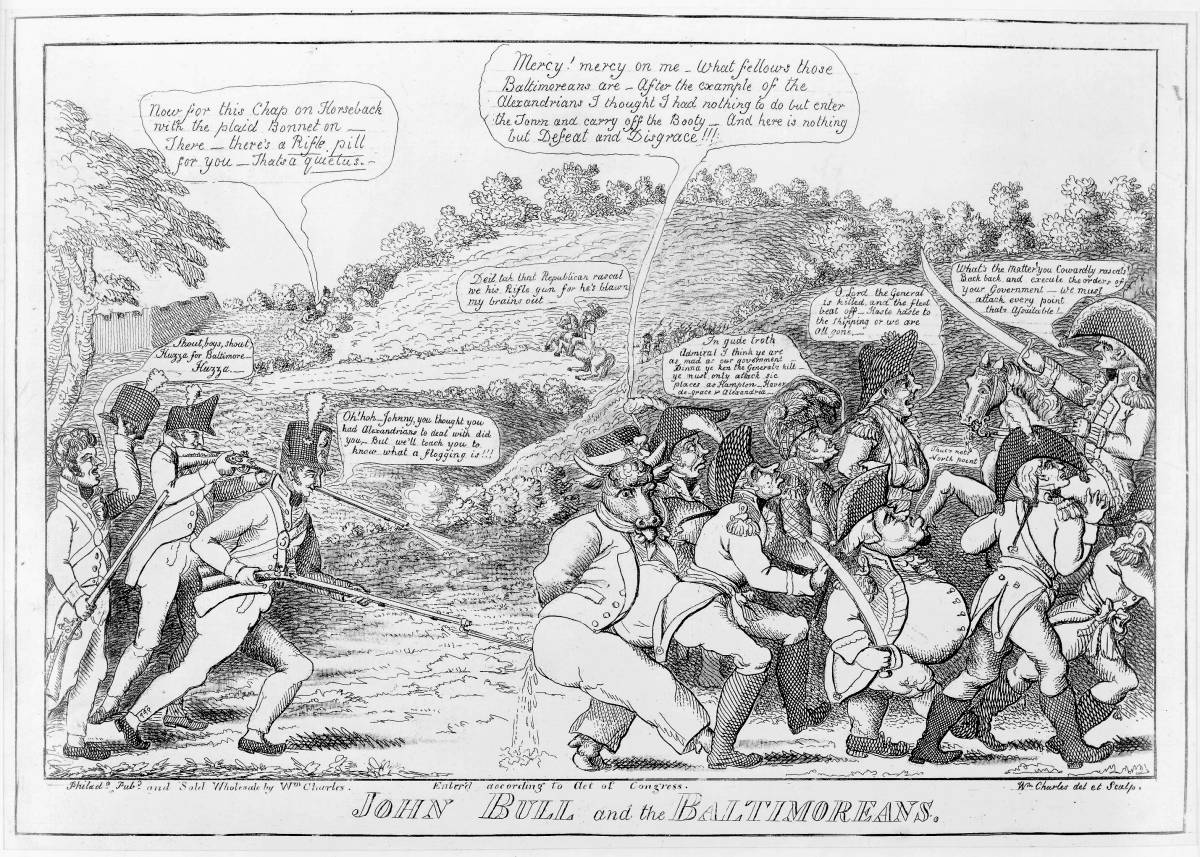
Political cartoon JOHN BULL and the BALTIMOREANS (1814) by William Charles, praising the stiff resistance in Baltimore, and satirizing the British retreat

The British had managed to win a tactical victory against American forces at a heavy cost. Apart from the other casualties and the Americans retreating in good order, losing Major-general Robert Ross was a critical blow to the British. He was an experienced and respected leader of British forces in the Peninsular War and the War of 1812. Ross's death proved to be a blow to British morale as well. The battle gave the defenders of Baltimore crucial time to complete their fortifications on Hampstead hills. The combined effect of the blow suffered at North Point and the failure of the Royal Navy to capture or get past Fort McHenry at the entrance to Baltimore harbor, despite a 25-hour bombardment, proved to be the turning point of the Battle of Baltimore. During the bombardment on Fort McHenry, Francis Scott Key was detained on a British ship at the entrance to Baltimore and penned the words to "The Star-Spangled Banner".

The day after the battle, Brooke advanced cautiously towards Baltimore. There was no more opposition from Stricker, but when the British came into view of the main defenses of Baltimore, Brooke estimated them to be manned by up to 22,000 militia, with 100 cannon. He prepared to make a night assault against the defenses at Loudenslager Hill, but asked Vice Admiral Alexander Cochrane to send boats and bomb ketches to silence an American battery, "Roger's Bastion", on the flank of his proposed attack. Despite a stiff fight between the boats, commanded by Captain Charles John Napier and the American batteries, the Bastion was unharmed and Brooke called off the attack and withdrew before dawn. The British re-embarked at North Point.

== Legacy ==
The battle is commemorated through the Maryland state holiday of Defenders Day, as well as on the patch of the Baltimore County Sheriff's Office. The lineage of the 5th Maryland is perpetuated by the 175th Infantry Regiment (MD ARNG), one of nineteen Army National Guard units with campaign credit for the War of 1812.

The Maryland Museum of Military History, housed in the Fifth Regiment Armory in Baltimore, Maryland, features an exhibit on the Battle of Baltimore which was installed to mark the 200th anniversary of the battle.

== References and further reading ==
- Brooks, Victor; Hohwald, Robert (1998). How America Fought Its Wars. Da Capo Press. ISBN 1-58097-002-8.
- Crawford, Michael J., ed. (2002). The Naval War of 1812: A Documentary History, Vol. 3. Washington: Naval Historical Center (GPO). ISBN 978-0-16-051224-7.
- Elting, John R. (1995). Amateurs to Arms! A Military History of the War of 1812. New York: Da Capo Press. ISBN 0-306-80653-3.
- George, Christopher T. (2001). Terror on the Chesapeake: The War of 1812 on the Bay. Shippensburg, Pennsylvania: White Mane. ISBN 1-57249-276-7.
- Gleig, George Robert (1827). The Campaigns of the British Army at Washington and New Orleans, 1814–1815. London: J. Murray. ISBN 0-665-45385-X.
- James, William (1818). A Full and Correct Account of the Military Occurrences of the Late War Between Great Britain and the United States of America. Vol. II. London. Printed for the author. ISBN 0-665-35743-5.
- James, William (1902) [1837]. The naval history of Great Britain (1813–1827). Vol. 6 (New six volume ed.). London: Macmillan. OCLC 493526150.
- Liston, Kathy Lee Erlandson (2006). "Where Are the British Soldiers Killed in the Battle of North Point Buried?". Myedgemere.com. Fort Howard, Maryland. Archived from the original on November 26, 2010.
- Lord, Walter (1994). The Dawn's Early Light. Baltimore: The Johns Hopkins University Press. ISBN 978-0-80-184864-3.
- McCavitt, John, and Christopher T. George. The Man Who Captured Washington: Major General Robert Ross and the War of 1812. Norman: University of Oklahoma Press, 2016. ISBN 9780806151649 see online review
- Pitch, Anthony S. (2000). The Burning of Washington. Annapolis: Naval Institute Press. ISBN 1-55750-425-3.
- Whitehorne, Joseph A. (1997). The Battle for Baltimore 1814. Baltimore: Nautical & Aviation Publishing. ISBN 1-877853-23-2.
- Esposito, Vincent J. (2003). Atlas of American Military History. Oxford University Press. p. 54. ISBN 978-0-19-521776-6.
- Esposito, Vincent J. (2003). Atlas of American Military History. Oxford University Press. p. 54. ISBN 978-0-19-521776-6.
