= 5th Maryland Regiment =

- Active: 1776–1783
- Country: United States
- Allegiance: Continental Congress of the United States
- Branch: Army
- Type: Infantry
- Size: 728 soldiers(1776) re-organized to 611 soldiers(1781)
- Part of: Maryland Line
- Engagements: American Revolutionary War: Defense of Philadelphia; Philadelphia- Monmouth; Defense of the Carolinas; Greene's Campaign

Commanders
- Notable commanders: Colonel William Richardson; General Johann DeKalb

The 5th Maryland Regiment is a designation which has been held by several units over the years, not all of which necessarily share the same lineage and honors. The term "5th Maryland" has most frequently been connected to militia units in Baltimore, even though the first unit to bear the designation was formed in 1776 from volunteers in rural Maryland. The "5th Maryland" designation is the officially recognized traditional designation of the 175th Infantry Regiment, Maryland Army National Guard. This entry refers to the rural 5th Maryland, whose lineage is separate and distinct from the Baltimore 5th Maryland perpetuated by the 175th Infantry Regiment.

== American Revolution ==
The first 5th Maryland Regiment was organized on March 27, 1776, comprising eight companies of volunteers from the counties of Queen Anne's, Kent, Caroline, and Dorchester of the colony of Maryland and was authorized on September 16, 1776, for service with the Continental Army.

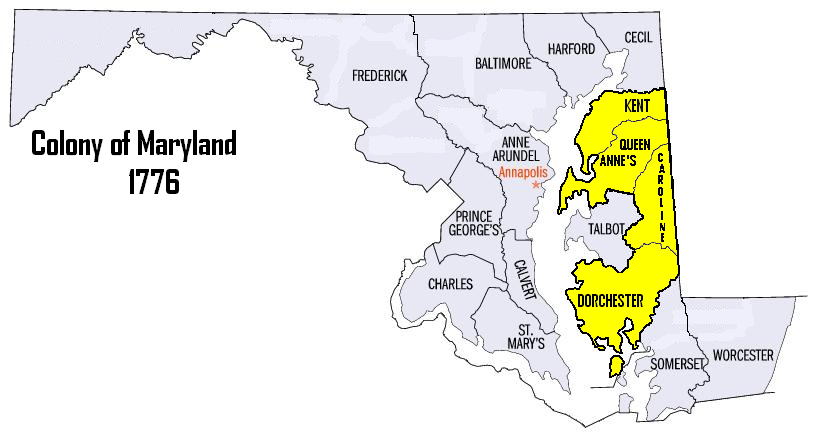
Recruitment Areas

It was assigned to the main Continental Army on December 27, 1776. On May 22, 1777, it was assigned to the 1st Maryland Brigade and re-organized on May 12, 1779, to nine companies. It was reassigned to the Southern Department on April 5, 1780. The regiment was reassigned from the 1st Maryland Brigade to the Maryland Brigade on January 1, 1781. The regiment would see action during the Battle of Long Island (1776), the Battle of Brandywine (1777), the Battle of Germantown (1777), the Battle of Monmouth (1778), the Battle of Camden (1780), and the Battle of Guilford Court House (1781). The regiment was furloughed January 1, 1782, at Round O, South Carolina and disbanded on January 1, 1783.

== Difference From the Modern Fifth Regiment ==
Another 5th Maryland, nicknamed "The Dandy Fifth," was formed in 1867. The lineage of this unit is carried on today by the Maryland Army National Guard's 175th Infantry Regiment. This 5th Maryland also traces its lineage back to the American Revolutionary War, but ironically, its lineage does not include the Revolutionary War 5th Regiment. Instead, it traces its ancestry to militia raised in Baltimore, and its battle honors differ from those of the Revolutionary 5th Regiment. The 175th Infantry's lineage and honors does include the 5th Maryland Regiment of the War of 1812 and 1st Maryland Infantry, CSA of the American Civil War.
