= William Stewart =

William, Willie, Will, Bill or Billy Stewart may refer to:

== Entertainment ==
- Jack Williamson or Will Stewart (1908–2006), American science fiction writer
- William G. Stewart (1933–2017), English television producer, director and presenter of Fifteen to One
- Billy Stewart (1937–1970), American R&B singer and pianist
- Bill Stewart (actor) (1942–2006), English actor best known as Sandy Longford on A Touch of Frost
- Bill Stewart (musician) (born 1966), American jazz drummer
- Will Stewart (musician), American singer-songwriter

== Public officials ==
=== Australia and New Zealand ===
- William Stewart (governor) (1769–1854), lieutenant governor of New South Wales
- William James Stewart (businessman) (1855–1924), businessman and mayor of Northam, Western Australia
- William Downie Stewart Sr. (1842–1898), member of House of Representatives for City of Dunedin and Dunedin West
- William Downie Stewart Jr (1878–1949), historian; mayor of Dunedin; son of William Downie Stewart Sr.
- William Stewart (New Zealand politician) (1861–1955), Reform Party member of House of Representatives

=== Canada ===
- William Stewart (Canada West) (1803–1856), Canadian businessman and political figure
- William J. Stewart (hydrographic surveyor) (1863–1925), Canada's first chief hydrographic surveyor
- William S. Stewart (1855–1938), lawyer, judge and political figure on Prince Edward Island
- William Atcheson Stewart (1915–1990), member of Legislative Assembly of Ontario
- William Douglas Stewart (1938-2018), member of House of Commons
- William Dunbar Stewart (1839–?), merchant and political figure on Prince Edward Island
- William James Stewart (1889–1969), mayor of Toronto
- William Stewart (Ontario politician), leader of the Communist party in Ontario in the 1970s

=== United Kingdom and Ireland ===
- William Stewart (bishop of Aberdeen) (c. 1490–1545), Scottish clergyman and diplomat
- William Stewart (Lord Mayor of London), lord mayor of London
- William Stewart (Belfast South MP) (1868–1946), Northern Ireland member of the Parliament of the UK
- William Stewart (Houghton-le-Spring MP) (1878–1960), English member of parliament
- William Stewart (ILP politician) (1856–1947), secretary of the Scottish Divisional Council of the Independent Labour Party
- William Stewart (Northern Ireland senator) (c. 1910/11—1979), member of the Senate of Northern Ireland
- William Stewart (politician, died 1748) (c. 1706–1748), Scottish member of the Parliament of Great Britain
- William Stewart (MP for Kirkcudbright) (1737–1797), Scottish member of the Parliament of Great Britain
- Sir William Stewart (British Army officer, born 1774) (1774–1827), Scottish member of the Parliament of Great Britain
- Sir William Steuart (British Army officer) (1643–1726), or Stewart, Scots-Irish soldier
- William Stewart, 1st Earl of Blessington (1709–1769), Anglo-Irish peer and member of the House of Lords
- William Stewart, 2nd Viscount Mountjoy (1675–1728), Anglo-Irish peer
- Will Stewart (bishop) (1943–1998), bishop of Taunton
- Sir William Houston Stewart (1822–1901), Scottish naval officer
- Sir William Stewart of Baldorran (c.1440–c.1500), Scottish landowner
- William Stewart of Caverston, Scottish soldier, captain of Dumbarton Castle
- William Stewart of Grandtully (1567–1646), Scottish landowner and courtier
- Sir William Stewart of Houston (1540–1605), Scottish soldier, privy councilor and diplomat
- William Stewart of Monkton (died 1588), Scottish landowner
- William Stewart (courtier), Scottish servant to James VI
- William Stewart, Lord Allanbridge (1925–2012), Scottish judge
- William Stewart, 1st Viscount Mountjoy (1653–1692), Anglo-Irish peer and soldier
- William Stewart of Luthrie (died 1569), Scottish herald and messenger

=== United States ===
- William Stewart (Pennsylvania politician) (1810–1876), represented 23rd congressional district from 1857 to 1861
- William G. Stewart (Florida politician)
- William M. Stewart (1827–1909), one of Nevada's first two U.S. senators
- William Thomas Stewart (1853–1935), Utah territorial legislature
- William R. Stewart (1864–1958), second African-American elected to Ohio Senate
- William J. Stewart (Pennsylvania politician) (1950–2016)

== Science ==
- William Alexander Stewart (1930–2002), American sociolinguist
- William Kilpatrick Stewart (1913–1967), Scottish researcher in aerospace physiology
- William H. Stewart (1921–2008), pediatrician and epidemiologist, 10th surgeon general of the US
- Sir William Stewart (biologist) (born 1935), Scottish microbiologist

== Sports ==
=== Football ===
- William Stewart (footballer, born 1868), Scottish footballer who played for Preston North End and Everton in the 1890s
- Willie Stewart (1872–1945), Scottish footballer who played for Newton Heath and Luton Town
- William Stewart (footballer, born 1875) (1875–1951), Scottish international footballer who played for Queen's Park and Newcastle United
- Billy Stewart (Australian footballer) (1884–1968), Australian rules footballer for St Kilda
- William Stewart (footballer, born 1897) (1897–1974), Scottish footballer who played for Queen's Park and Shawfield
- William Stewart (footballer, born 1910), Scottish footballer who played for Manchester United and Motherwell
- Bill Stewart (gridiron football) (1952–2012), American football coach
- Billy Stewart (footballer, born 1965), English goalkeeper who played for several clubs, including Chester and Southport

=== Other sports ===
- William Stewart (Australian cricketer) (1844–?), Australian cricketer
- William Stewart (English cricketer) (1847–1883)
- William Stewart (cyclist) (1883–1950), British Olympic cyclist
- William Stewart (athlete) (1889–1958), Australian sprinter
- William Stewart (rower) (born 1997), British rower
- Will Stewart (baseball) (born 1997), American baseball pitcher
- Bill Stewart (sports official) (1894–1964), American baseball coach and ice hockey referee
- Bill Stewart (high jumper) (born 1921), American high jumper and winner of the high jump at the 1941 USA Outdoor Track and Field Championships
- Bill Stewart (baseball) (1928–2013), American baseball outfielder, Kansas City Athletics
- William Payne Stewart (1957–1999), American golfer
- Bill Stewart (ice hockey) (born 1957), Canadian ice hockey defenceman
- Bill Stewart (rugby league) (born 1927), Australian rugby league player
- Bill Stewart (rugby union) (1889–1958), Scottish rugby union player

== Other people ==
- William Stewart (makar), Scottish poet and translator active in the 1530s
- William Stewart (skipper) (fl. c. 1580–1610), Scottish sea captain from Dundee
- William Robert Stewart (died 1818), American ship captain
- William W. Stewart (1776–1851), Scottish-born whaler, sealer and settler
- Sir William Drummond Stewart (1795–1871), Scottish adventurer and British military officer
- William Boyd Stewart (1835–1912), Canadian pastor, writer, and educator
- William Alvah Stewart (1903–1953), American federal judge
- Bill Stewart (journalist) (1941–1979), American TV correspondent for ABC News
- Bill Stewart (programmer) (1950–2009), American software creator
- William Maxwell Stewart (1874–1926), Scottish ventilation engineer

== See also ==
- William Steuart (disambiguation)
- Stewart (name)
- William Stuart (disambiguation)
- Will Stewart and John, an English-language folk song
