= George Steuart Hume =

American physician and landowner

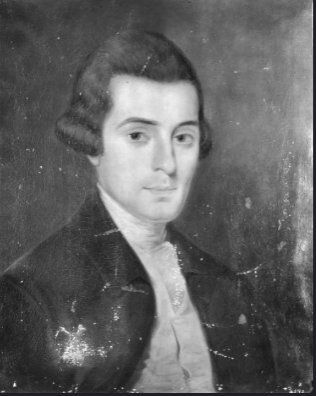
- George Steuart Hume, born George Hume Steuart, circa 1770
- Born: George Hume Steuart; 1747; Anne Arundel County, Maryland
- Died: c. 1788; Perthshire, Scotland
- Occupation: Physician
- Spouse(s): Mary Rollo, Jean Munro

George Steuart Hume, also known as George Home, (1747 – c.1787/1788) was a Maryland physician and landowner who emigrated to Scotland before the American Revolutionary War. Born George Hume Steuart in Maryland, he left for Scotland in 1758, where he studied medicine, changing his name to his maternal name of Hume in order to inherit his family's substantial Scottish estates.

The house at Argaty, Hume's Perthshire estate.

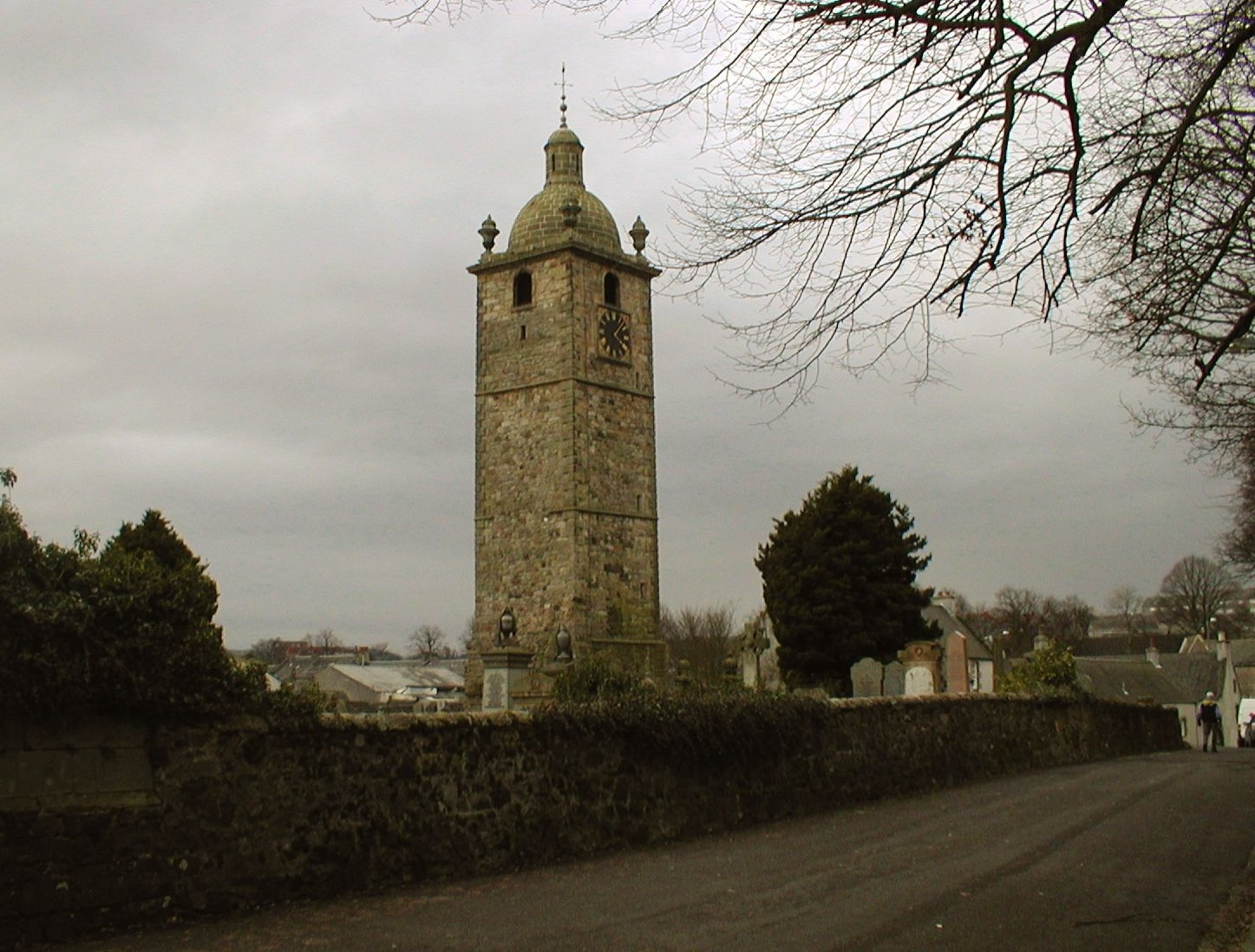
Church tower of St. Ninians, Stirlingshire, where Hume married his first wife, Mary Erskine of Powis, in 1777.

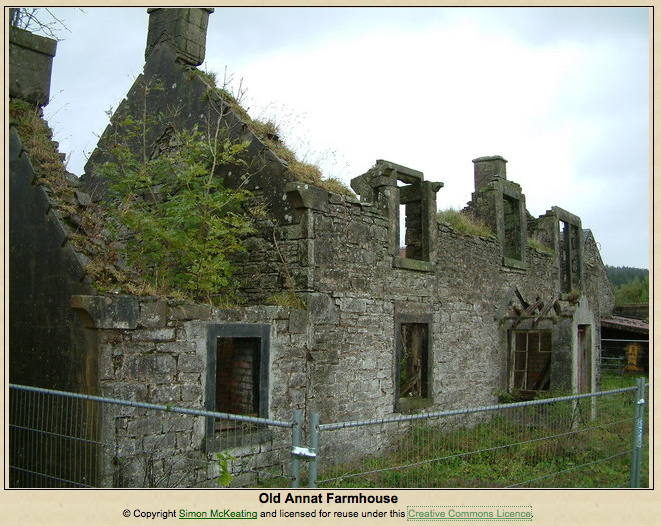
Ruins of the old farmhouse at Annat, near Doune, part of Hume's Perthshire estates. Photo: Simon McKeating.

== Early life ==
Hume was born in Anne Arundel County, Maryland, in 1747, the eldest son of planter and physician George Hume Steuart (1700–1784), and Anne Digges. As the eldest son he stood to inherit the family plantation of Dodon in Maryland, but the coming of the Revolutionary War forced his father to divided his property between his sons. Hume was eventually to inherit the Scottish estates, with the Maryland lands being divided between his brothers, now loyal to the fledgling United States of America. These however were substantial; through his father he inherited the estates of Ballachallan, Argaty and Annat. These estates were held under entail, and Steuart changed his name to Hume (also spelled "Home") in order to be able to inherit.

== Family ==
Hume married Mary Erskine of Powis, daughter of David Rollo of Powis, Scotland on February 9, 1777, in St. Ninians, Stirlingshire. Through Mary, he became possessed of the historic site of the battle of Bannockburn. Mary died young, and the couple had no known children. After Mary's death, Hume married again, on November 20, 1785, in Kilmadock, Perthshire, to Jane Munro, daughter of John Munro of Auchenbowie. They had one daughter, Sophia Hume-Steuart, born on August 5, 1787.

== Revolutionary War ==
Hume's family was divided by the Revolutionary War, and he would never return to his Maryland birthplace. However, according to the memoirs of his nephew Richard Sprigg Steuart, Hume supported the ideals of the American rebels, and "was a staunch whig, and voted only for such members of parliament as went deadweight against the government and the war."

== Legacy ==
After Hume's death in c. 1788, his infant daughter Sophia inherited his estates of Argaty, Ballachallan and Annat. His younger brother Charles Steuart unsuccessfully sued his niece Sophia for Hume's Scottish inheritance.

According to Alexander B Barty, in his book Argaty, its Lairds and its Barony:

"At that time there was a doubt whether under the Entail Sophia Home was entitled to succeed her, or whether George Home's brothers, namely Charles Steuart, was now heir. Was decided in favour of the infant Sophia."
