= William Steuart =

William Steuart may refer to:

== Scotland ==
- William Steuart (British Army officer) (1643–1726), Scottish general
- William Steuart (Scottish politician) (1686–1768), Scottish lawyer, member of parliament 1713–41

== Maryland ==
- William Frederick Steuart 1816–1889 (1816–1889), Confederate surgeon
- William Steuart (Mayor of Baltimore) (1754–1838), mayor of Baltimore
- William Steuart (planter) (1754–1838), Maryland planter

== See also ==
- Billy Steuart (born 1936), South African swimmer
- William Stewart (disambiguation)
- William Stuart (disambiguation)
