= William Stuart =

William Stuart may refer to:

== Politics ==
- Lord William Stuart (1778–1814), naval commander, MP for Cardiff (1802–14); nephew of William Stuart (1755–1822)
- William Stuart (1798–1874), Tory MP for Armagh City 1820–1826, Bedfordshire (1830–31; 1832–35); son of William Stuart (1755–1822)
- William Stuart (1824–1896), British diplomat, Minister to Argentina, Greece, and The Netherlands
- William Stuart (1825–1893), Conservative MP for Bedford (1854–57 and 1859–68); son of William Stuart (1798–1874)
- William Horwood Stuart (1857–1906), British diplomat and vice-consul; assassinated in Batum, Georgia
- William Z. Stuart (1811–1876), justice of the Indiana Supreme Court

== Sports ==
- Bill Stuart (1873–1928), American Major League Baseball player
- Hod Stuart (William Hodgson Stuart, 1879–1907), Canadian ice hockey player
- Billy Stuart (William Roxborough Stuart, 1900–1978), Canadian ice hockey player
- William Stuart (cricketer, born 1871) (1871–1956), Australian cricketer
- William Stuart (cricketer, born 1889) (1889–1917), Scottish cricketer and British Army officer
- William Stuart (footballer) (1890–?), English footballer
- Bill Stuart (rugby league), New Zealand rugby league player
- Will Stuart (born 1996), English rugby union player

== Other ==
- William Stuart (bishop) (1755–1822), bishop of St David's in Wales and later archbishop of Armagh in Ireland
- William Stuart (British Army officer) (1778–1837), British Army officer, Lieutenant Colonel of the Guards wounded at Waterloo
- William James Stuart (British Army officer) (1831-1914), British Army officer, Colonel Commandant of the Royal Engineers
- William Corwin Stuart (1920–2010), American federal judge
- William James Stuart (1873–1958), Scottish surgeon

== See also ==
- William Stewart (disambiguation)
- William Steuart (disambiguation)
