= William Steuart (planter) =

American planter (1754–1839)

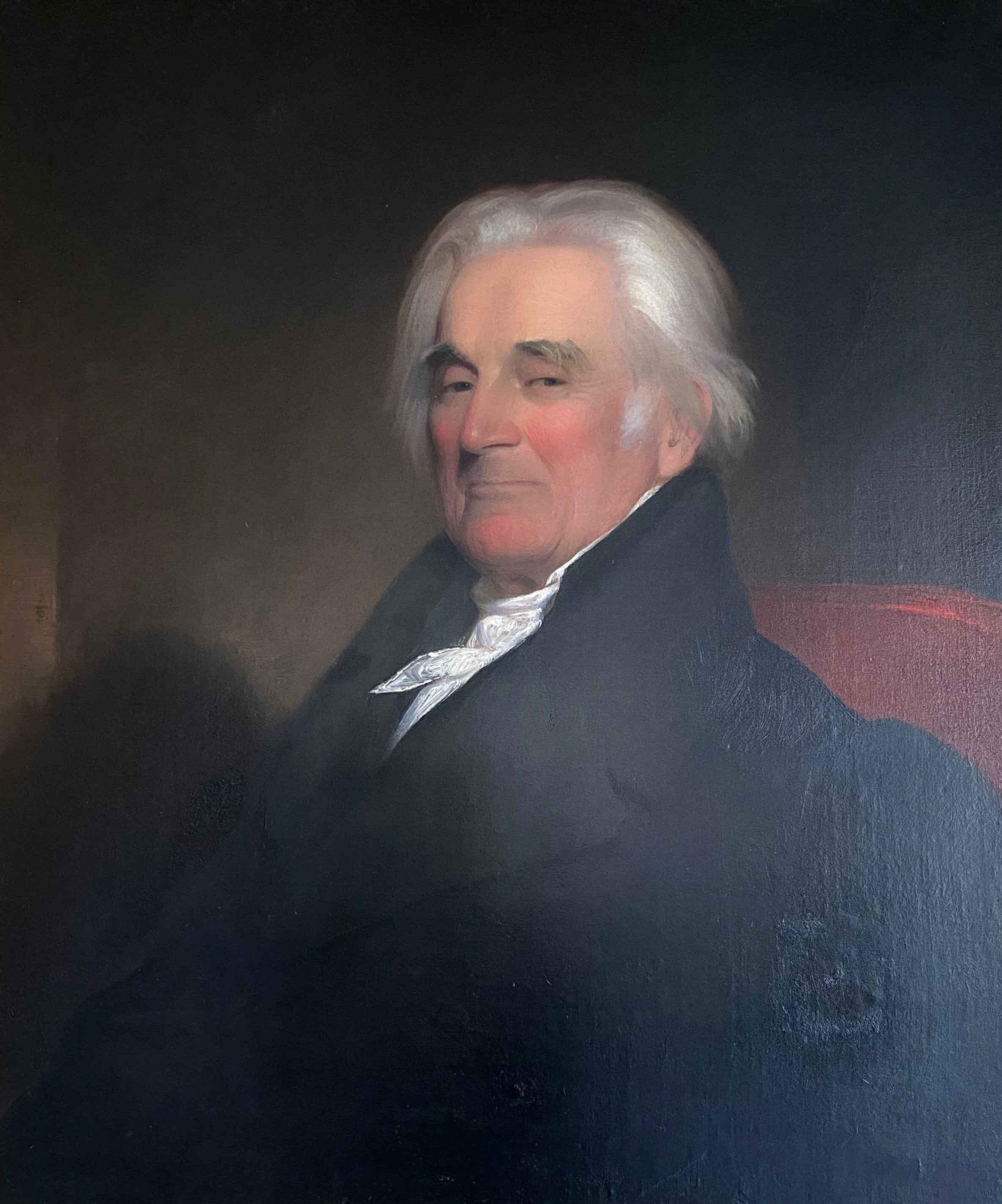
- Born: William Steuart; 1754; Anne Arundel County, Maryland
- Died: February 12, 1839 (aged 84–85); Anne Arundel County, Maryland
- Occupation: planter

William Steuart (1754 – February 12, 1839) was an American planter from Maryland. He inherited the estate of Dodon in Anne Arundel County, Maryland, from his father, planter and politician George H. Steuart.

== Early life ==
Steuart was born in 1754 in Anne Arundel County, Maryland, the fourth son of the planter and politician George H. Steuart (1700–1784). He was raised at Dodon, the family plantation on the South River, near Annapolis, Maryland.

== Career ==
As a young man Steuart served as clerk to the two Judges of the Land Office, his father George H. Steuart and Benedict Swingate Calvert, who was the illegitimate son of Charles Calvert, 5th Baron Baltimore, the third Proprietor Governor of Maryland. The Steuart family's interests were closely linked to those of the ruling Calvert family, and in 1770 there was a disagreement between the upper and lower houses in the Maryland Assembly over the size of fees to be collected by the Land Office. After collecting fees that were larger than those designated by the lower house, Steuart was jailed. In response to this Governor Robert Eden prorogued the assembly, freed Steuart, and removed him from the assembly's jurisdiction. The question of proprietarial fees was to cause considerable discontent among Marylanders during the years immediately preceding the American Revolution.

=== Revolutionary War ===
Steuart's family was divided by the Revolution. His father George H. Steuart was a Loyalist politician who, as an ally of the ruling Calvert family, had benefited from substantial political patronage. In addition Steuart held estates in both Maryland and Scotland and, at the outbreak of war, forced to make a choice between loyalty to the Crown and backing the Revolution, he sailed to Scotland, saying that he "could not turn rebel in his old age", and pragmatically dividing his property between his sons. William Steuart accompanied his father to Scotland in 1775 and returned to Maryland after the war was over.

Despite this, according to the memoirs of his nephew Richard Sprigg Steuart, William Steuart was sympathetic to Revolutionary cause. "Uncle William was mild and conciliatory, rather Republican, but with too much respect for his father to say much".

After the end of the war, Steuart inherited the family estate of Dodon, on the South River, near Annapolis, Maryland. He was a founder member of the Maryland Jockey Club, re-established after the war's end on Saturday, March 1, 1783, at Mr Mann's tavern in Annapolis. Club rules were set down including that the plate given by the club should be run on the first Tuesday of November, at Annapolis, that the prize money should be "sixty guineas", and that the annual subscription should be "three guineas".

== Will and legacy ==
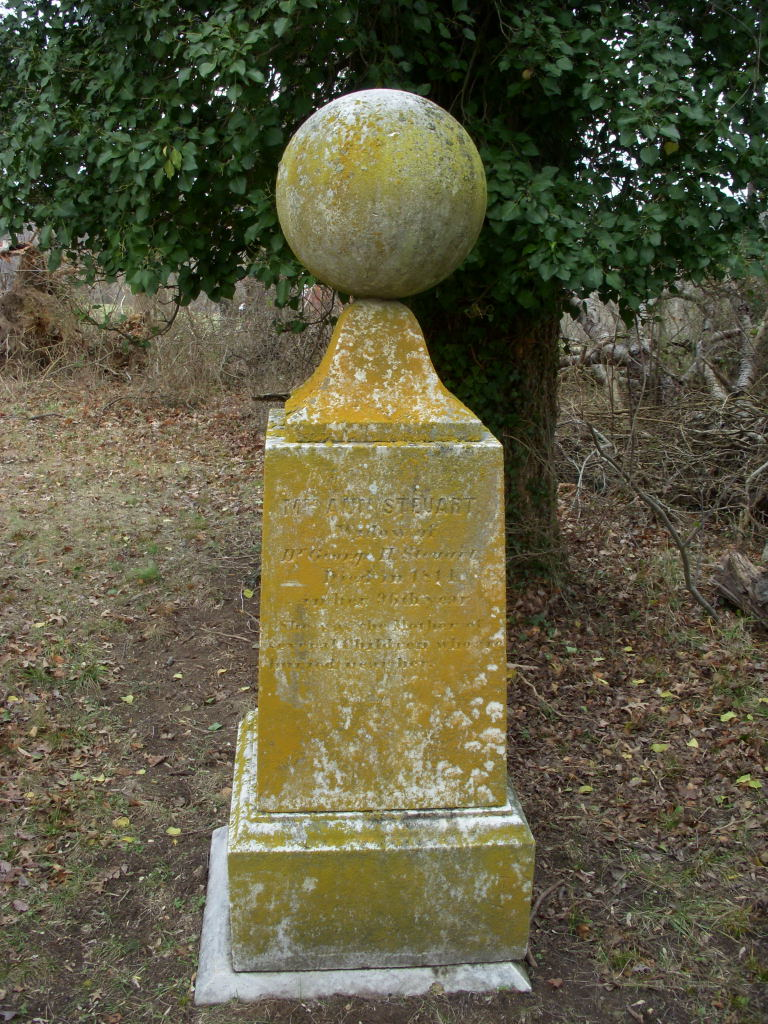
Stone obelisk at Dodon marking the burial place of William Steuart and other members of his family.

William Steuart died unmarried, leaving a substantial estate in land and slaves which was apportioned among his surviving family members. His will left detailed instructions on which family members would inherit the substantial Steuart estates in Maryland. According to the memoirs of his nephew Richard Sprigg Steuart "The fifth of my grandfather's children was William, also a bachelor, [who] left a very large landed property and numerous slaves. He was our good old "Uncle Billy".

He is buried at the family estate of Dodon on the South River, near Annapolis.

== See also ==
- Colonial families of Maryland
- Province of Maryland
- Steuart family
