= William Downie Stewart =

William Downie Stewart may refer to:

- William Downie Stewart Sr (1842–1898), member of House of Representatives for City of Dunedin and Dunedin West
- William Downie Stewart Jr (1878–1949), historian; mayor of Dunedin; son of William Downie Stewart Sr

== See also ==
- William Stewart (disambiguation)
