= George H. Steuart (politician) =

Scottish physician, planter, and politician (1700–1784)

George Hume Steuart

Lord Mayor of Annapolis
- In office 1759–1763
- Preceded by: John Brice, Jr.
- Succeeded by: Daniel Dulany

Colonel of the Horse Militia
- Incumbent
- Assumed office 1753

Deputy Secretary of Maryland
- In office 1755–1756

Judge of the Land Office
- In office 1755–1775
- Succeeded by: St George Peale

Personal details
- Born: c. 1700 Argaty, Perthshire, Scotland
- Died: 1784 Perthshire, Scotland
- Spouse: Ann Digges
- Relations: Major General George H. Steuart (grandson); Richard Sprigg Steuart (grandson); Brigadier General George H. Steuart (great-grandson)
- Education: University of Edinburgh
- Occupation: Physician, planter, politician, soldier

George Hume Steuart (1700 – 1784) was a Scottish physician, planter, and politician who spent most of his life in colonial Maryland. Born in Perthshire, Steuart emigrated to Maryland in around 1721, where he benefited from proprietarial patronage and was appointed to a number of colonial offices, eventually becoming a wealthy landowner with estates in both Maryland and Scotland, and serving two terms as Lord Mayor of Annapolis. However, he was forced by the outbreak of the American Revolution to decide whether to remain loyal to the Crown or to throw in his lot with the American rebels. In 1775 Steuart sailed to Scotland, deciding at age 75 that "he could not turn rebel in his old age". He remained there until his death in 1784.

== Early life ==
Steuart was born in Argaty, Perthshire (now Stirling), in around 1695–1700, the second son of George Steuart and Mary Hume. His family were members of the Balquhidder Stewart clan, descendants of Murdoch Stewart, Duke of Albany, executed by King James I of Scotland in 1425.

It is likely that Steuart spoke both Gaelic and English. According to the Old Statistical Account of 1799, Scottish Gaelic was the language of the "common people" of Balquhidder and the surrounding area, although English would have been spoken in the "low country", around Stirling. This would in fact have been the Scots language of the Stirlingshire area, rather than Standard English.

Steuart's elder brother David stood to inherit the family estates, and Steuart studied medicine, receiving his MD at the University of Edinburgh. In 1721 he emigrated to Annapolis, in the colony of Maryland, where he settled and established a medical practice.

In the early 18th century Maryland was a sparsely settled, largely rural society. In 1715 the population of Annapolis was just 405, though by 1730 this number had increased to 776.

== Planter and horse breeder ==
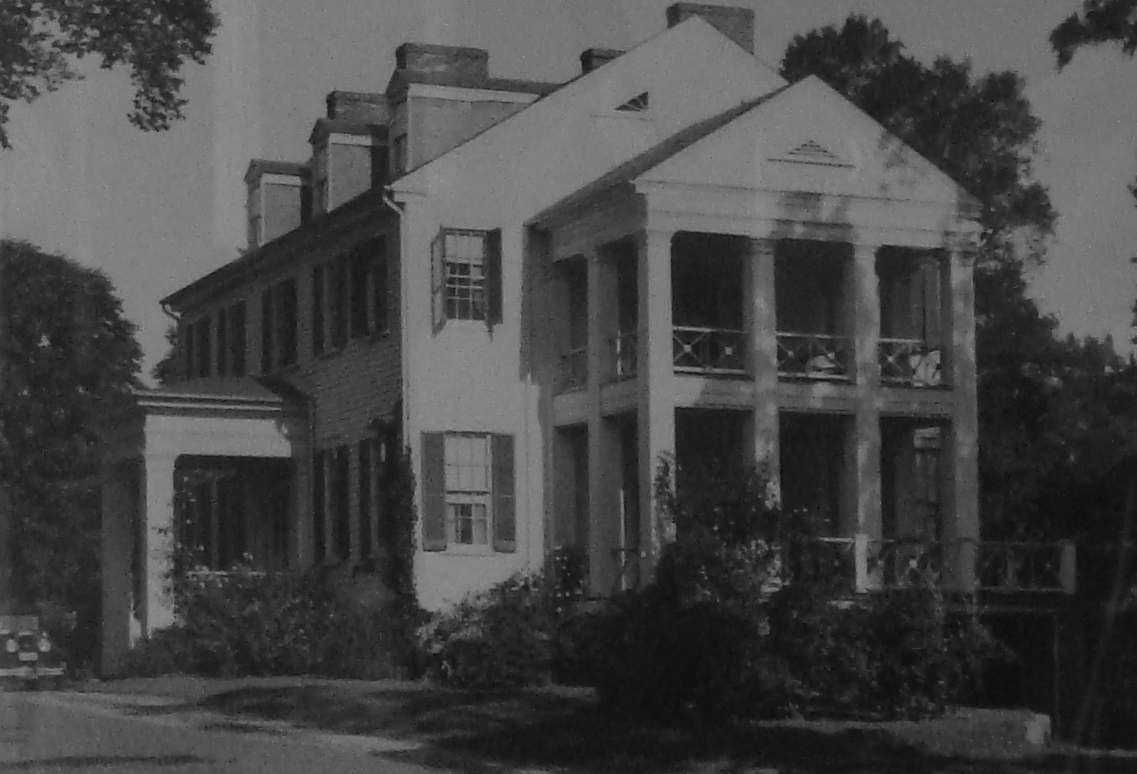
Steuart Plantation house at Dodon, near Annapolis, built c1800.

In 1747 Steuart purchased the estate of Dodon in South River, Anne Arundel County, Maryland, on the Chesapeake Bay, from Stephen Warman. At Dodon, Steuart farmed tobacco and participated in match races. His most successful horse was Dungannon, which he had brought from England to compete against the stable of his rival, Charles Carroll of Annapolis (1703–1783), whose son Charles Carroll of Carrollton would later sign the Declaration of Independence in 1776. Dungannon won the Annapolis Subscription Plate, the first recorded formal horse race in Maryland, in May 1743. The race took place in Parole and the original silver cup is now displayed in the Baltimore Museum of Art.

Horse racing formed an important part of the social and political life of the colony, with numerous gentlemen of means forming large studs. George Washington attended early meetings of the Maryland Jockey Club, and Steuart entertained the future president at his home in Annapolis.

According to the writer Abbe Robin, who traveled through Maryland during the Revolutionary War, men of Steuart's class and status enjoyed considerable wealth and prosperity:

"[Maryland houses] are large and spacious habitations, widely separated, composed of a number of buildings and surrounded by plantations extending farther than the eye can reach, cultivated...by unhappy black men whom European avarice brings hither...Their furniture is of the most costly wood, and rarest marbles, enriched by skilful and artistic work. Their elegant and light carriages are drawn by finely bred horses, and driven by richly apparelled slaves."

== Politics ==
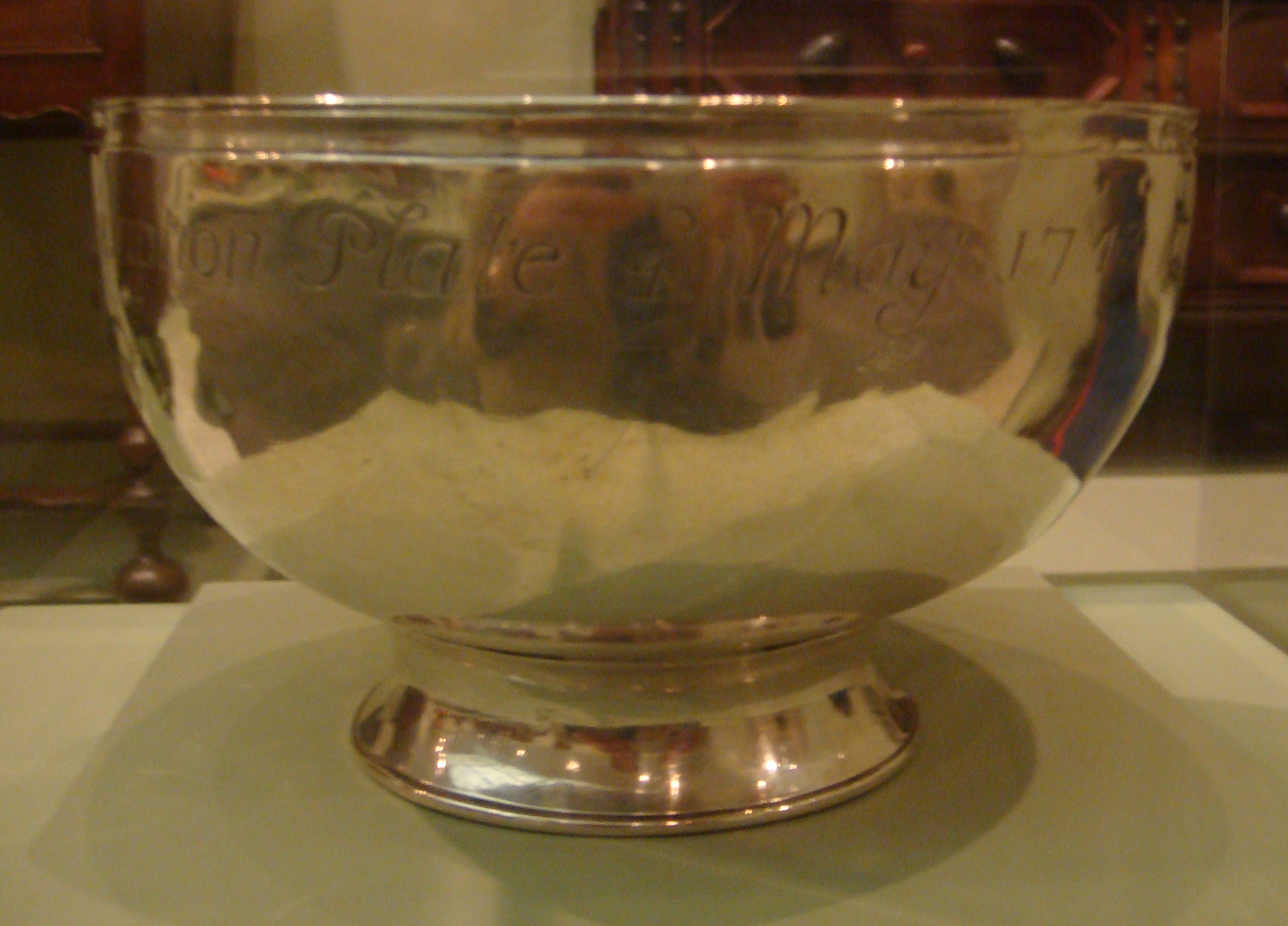
The Annapolis Subscription Plate, awarded to Steuart's racehorse Dungannon in 1743.

Argaty, Steuart's Perthshire estate.

Politically, Steuart was a Loyalist, his interests being closely aligned with those of the Calvert family, proprietors of the colony of Maryland. In 1742 Charles Calvert, 5th Baron Baltimore (1699–1751) sent his eldest but illegitimate son, Benedict Swingate Calvert, then aged around 10 or 20 years old, to Maryland and placed him in Steuart's care. The boy was provided with a tutor, the Italian Onorio Razzolini, and lived at Steuart's "old-fashioned house" on Francis St in Annapolis.

Steuart evidently benefited from the Calvert family's patronage as he went on to hold a number of important Colonial offices. In 1753 he was appointed lieutenant-colonel of The Horse Militia under Governor Horatio Sharpe, and he was Deputy Secretary of Maryland from 1755 to 1756. He served two one year terms as Mayor of Annapolis, from 1759 to 1761 and from 1763 to 1764. He was a judge of the Land Office (1755–1775), an office created in around 1715 to resolve disputes over title to land in the colony.

Steuart was also member of the "Council of Twelve", and a judge of the Court of Admiralty. In recognition of his services, Lord Baltimore appears to have given Steuart the nickname "Honest Steuart", a sobriquet later thrown back at him by his political enemies.

Maryland politics could evidently be rancorous. Court records show that Steuart and his successor as Annapolis mayor, Michael MacNamara, were both required "to post a bond to keep the peace...especially with each other".

Steuart returned to Scotland in 1758 to inherit the estate of Argaty, near Doune, Perthshire, through his mother Mary Hume (also spelled "Home"), and other estates through his father. By 1761 Steuart was back in Maryland; a series of letters dated March 1761 shows him, as Commissioner of the Loan Office, attempting to collect taxes due to the Proprietary Government from Sheriffs who were behind in their payments.

== Revolutionary War ==
=== The coming of war ===
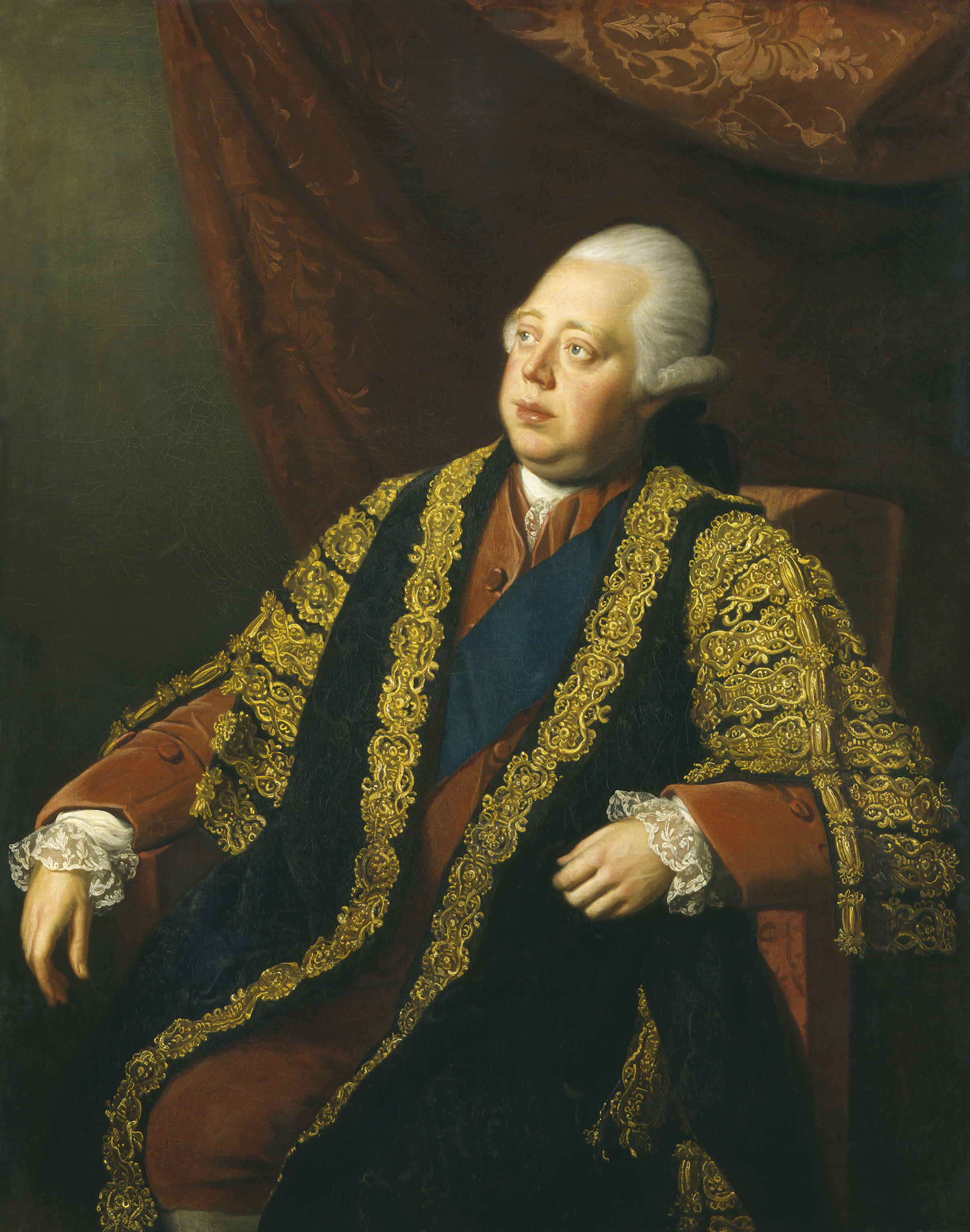
Lord North, to whom Steuart made representations in 1764.

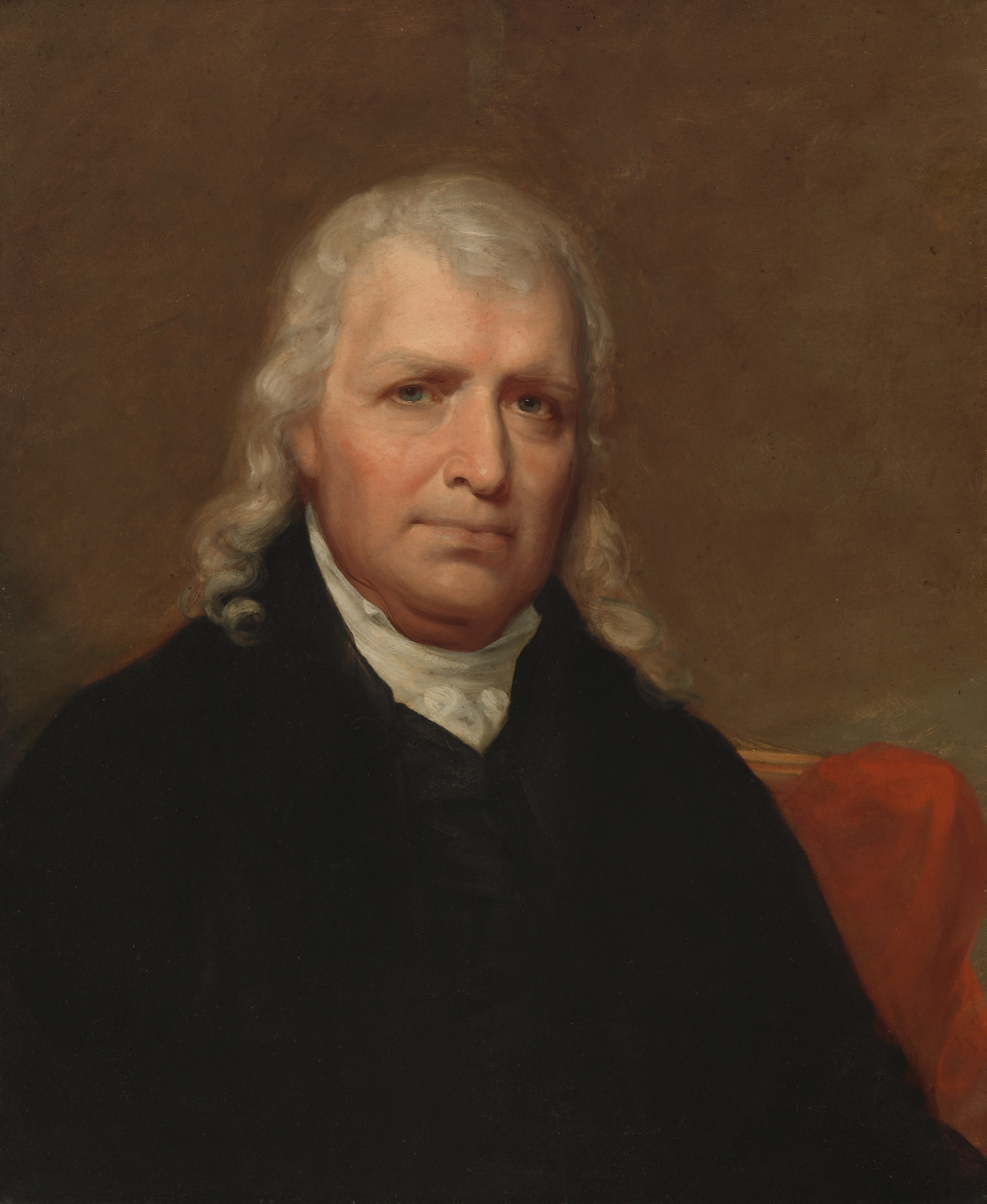
Samuel Chase, Steuart's implacable opponent.

In the 1760s relations between Britain and her North American colonies began to deteriorate. Steuart was and would remain a Loyalist; like many Scots he was likely influenced by memories of the consequences of the failed Jacobite uprisings against the Crown in his home country. Many Scots had fled to the American colonies following the suppression of the Jacobite rising of 1745, and had little appetite for further rebellion. However, like other Marylanders, Steuart opposed the taxes imposed by Parliament and in 1764 he traveled to England where he made representations to the government at Westminster. Steuart's grandson, Richard Sprigg Steuart (1797–1876), recalled in his memoirs:

"When he went over [to England] in 1764, to take my father [James Steuart] to school, he was commissioned by a number of Marylanders to call upon Lord North, England's new Chancellor of the Exchequer, hostile to America, on his way through London, and make representations on the subject of taxation. He was politely received and the minister put a great many questions to him, and seemed to acquiesce in all he said. [...] At all events my Grandfather had the pleasure soon after to hear of the repeal of this obnoxious tax".

Steuart's loyalist politics were opposed by, among others, Samuel Chase, co-founder of the Anne Arundel County chapter of the Sons of Liberty, a leading opponent of the 1765 Stamp Act, and later one of the signers of the Declaration of Independence. In an open letter dated 18 July 1766 Chase attacked John Brice, Steuart, Walter Dulany, Michael MacNamara and others for publishing an article in the Maryland Gazette Extraordinary of 19 June 1766, in which Chase had been accused of being: "a busy, reckless incendiary, a ringleader of mobs, a foul-mouthed and inflaming son of discord and faction, a common disturber of the public tranquility". In his response, Chase accused Steuart and the others of "vanity...pride and arrogance":

"...the people rejecting you [Steuart], as unfit for their confidence and trust, which you had repeatedly betrayed, and elected me in your room. I am not ashamed to own that I exerted myself in opposition to you. It was my opinion that a man without merit, integrity or abilities, was totally disqualified to be the representative of a free people. You had nothing to recommend you but proprietary influence, court favour, and the wealth and influence of the tools and favourites who infest this city."

Such protests were essentially a complaint against a civic government which was still dominated by men loyal to the Calvert interest. However, such highly personalised attacks did little to reduce the political temperature.

=== War with Great Britain ===
War broke out in 1775, and the fact of owning estates in both Scotland and Maryland caused Steuart considerable political difficulties. As Richard Sprigg Steuart recalled:

"He was an ardent admirer of the American Colonies, and believed the principles for which the colonists contended were just, and truly English. But though he sympathised with his American friends, he said he could not turn rebel in his old age, being 75 years old when the Revolution broke out...he would have forfeited [his Scottish estates] if he had joined the Revolutionists. He therefore went over to Scotland and saved his property there. He gave all his estates in Maryland to his wife [Ann], telling her by letter...how to leave the property in America, which was finally done."

Ann therefore remained in America despite her own Loyalist sympathies. She would never again see her husband, and she continued to live at Dodon until her death in 1814. According to Richard Sprigg Steuart:

"My Grandmother's family, the Digges, were at heart all Torys but kept quiet...they were called non-jurors and paid double taxes. [After the War] she lived comfortably, but she kept at home because her good husband was called by the mob a Tory, which he was not....he never while in Scotland heard of a battle that he did not express his regret and call it a fratricidal war."

=== Aftermath ===
Steuart never returned to Maryland, and he died in 1784 in Scotland, one year after the Revolutionary War ended. He was buried in Kilmadock, Perthshire. No portrait of him survives. When he left Maryland, his estates in Anne Arundel County comprised around 4,100 acres (17 km^{2}) of land. In 1780, these were transferred to his sons Charles and William, for a nominal sum.

The Argaty estate in Scotland was inherited by Steuart's eldest son, also named George Hume Steuart, who remained loyal to the British Crown. The estate, which was eventually sold in 1914, now forms part of a red kite conservation area.

== Family life ==
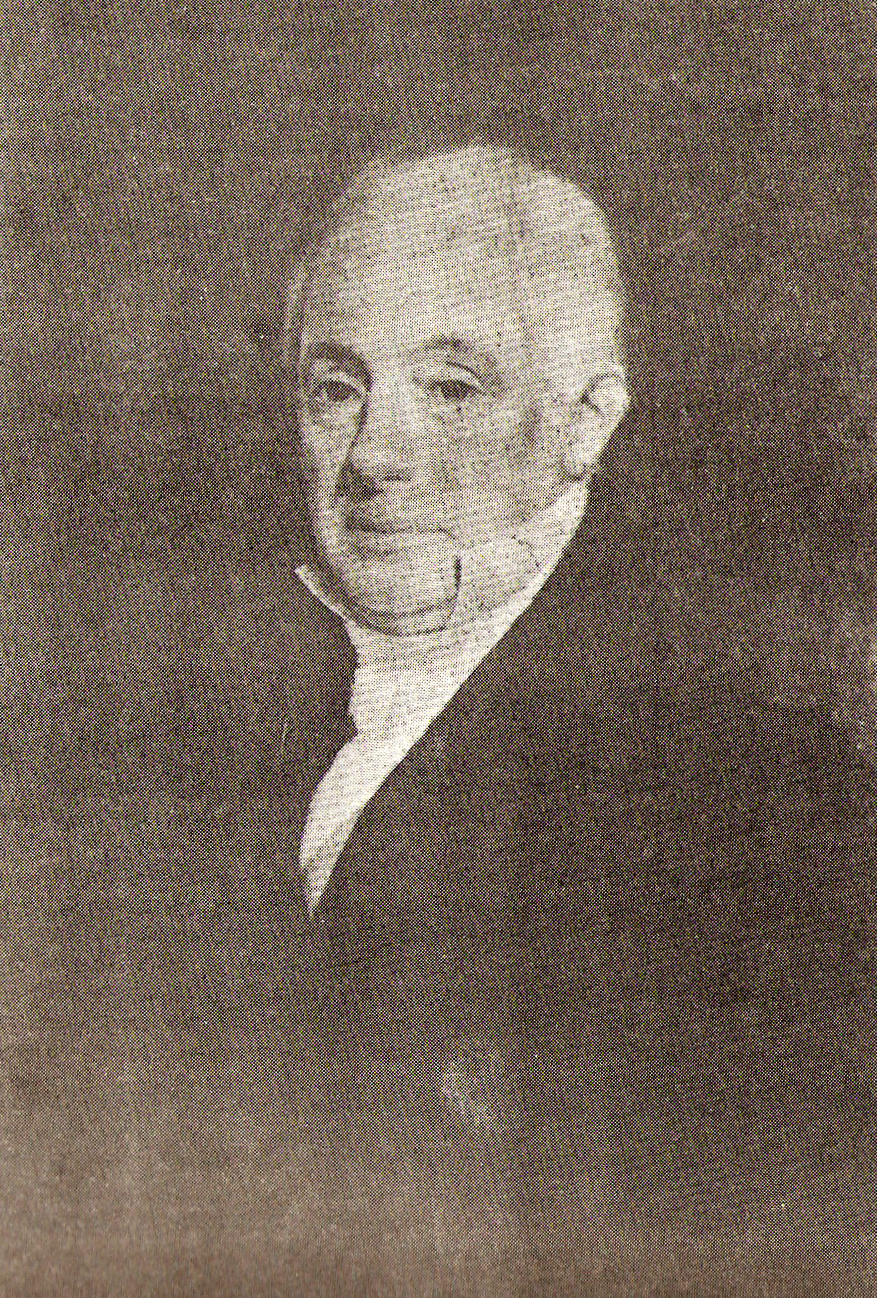
Dr James Steuart was a physician who served during the Revolutionary War

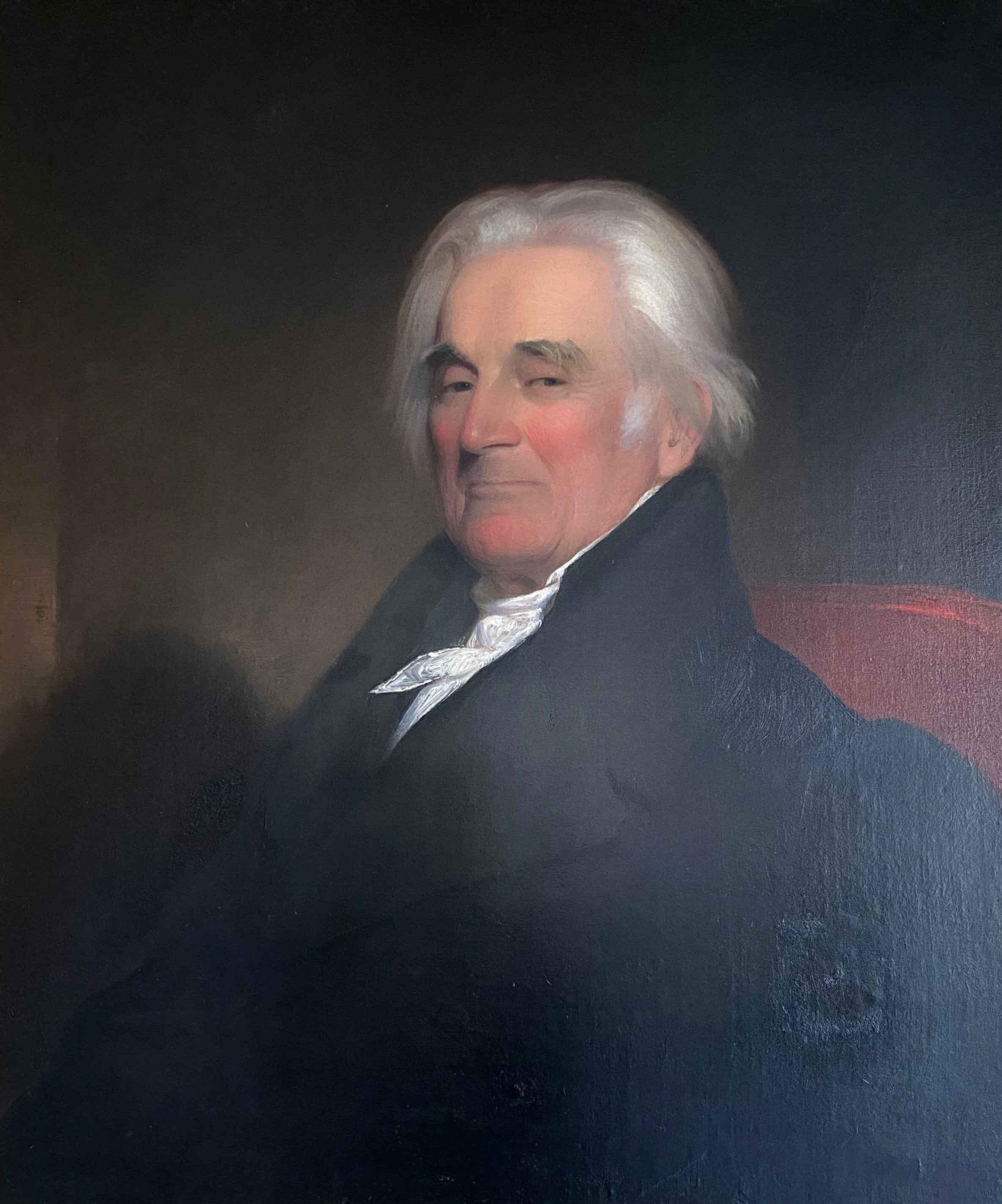
Steuart's fourth son William Steuart

In 1744 Steuart married Ann Digges (1721-1814), of Warburton Manor. She was the daughter of the planter Charles Digges (though Nelker states that Ann's father was one George Digges), who was the son of William Digges, a member of the Maryland Proprietary Council. Her mother was Susanna Maria (Lowe) Digges.

George and Ann Steuart had ten children, of whom six survived to adulthood:

- George H Steuart (1747–1788), physician. Emigrated to Scotland in 1758. Changed his name to George Steuart Hume to inherit the estate of Argaty, Perthshire, which thereafter passed to his infant daughter Sophia.
- Susanna Steuart (1749–1774), married on 19 June 1769 Judge James Tilghman of the Supreme Court of Maryland (1743–1809).
- Dr Charles Mark Steuart (1750–1798), physician. On 15 June 1780 Charles Steuart married Elizabeth Calvert, the daughter of Benedict Swingate Calvert. During the Revolution he was a Loyalist, being – like his mother Ann – "decidedly of the Tory faction". This did not, apparently, stop him being present with General George Washington at the Siege of Yorktown in 1781, or serving in The Flying Camp, a division of the patriot militia established by Washington in June 1776. After his older brother George's death, Charles Steuart unsuccessfully sued his niece, Sophia, for the inheritance of Argaty.
- David Steuart (1751–1814)
- William Steuart (1754–1839), wealthy planter who inherited Dodon
- Dr James Steuart (1755–1846), a physician who served during The Revolutionary War and owned a plantation at Sparrow's Point, Maryland. James Steuart was "a hot rebel...though afterwards a strong Federalist." His son Major General George H Steuart fought in the War of 1812. His grandson Brigadier General George H. Steuart (known as "Maryland Steuart" to distinguish him from his fellow General J.E.B. Stuart) was a Confederate general in the American Civil War, who fought at a number of battles including Gettysburg, Cross Keys and Winchester.

== Religion ==
Steuart was an Episcopalian, though his wife Ann was a Roman Catholic. According to Richard Sprigg Steuart:

"Though he and his excellent wife were of different churches, they never disagreed on the subject of religion; they found enough to believe in common to make them good Christians. And such was his confidence in her that he requested her to bring up his sons Episcopalians, as he knew the disadvantages politically of joining any other."

== Legacy ==
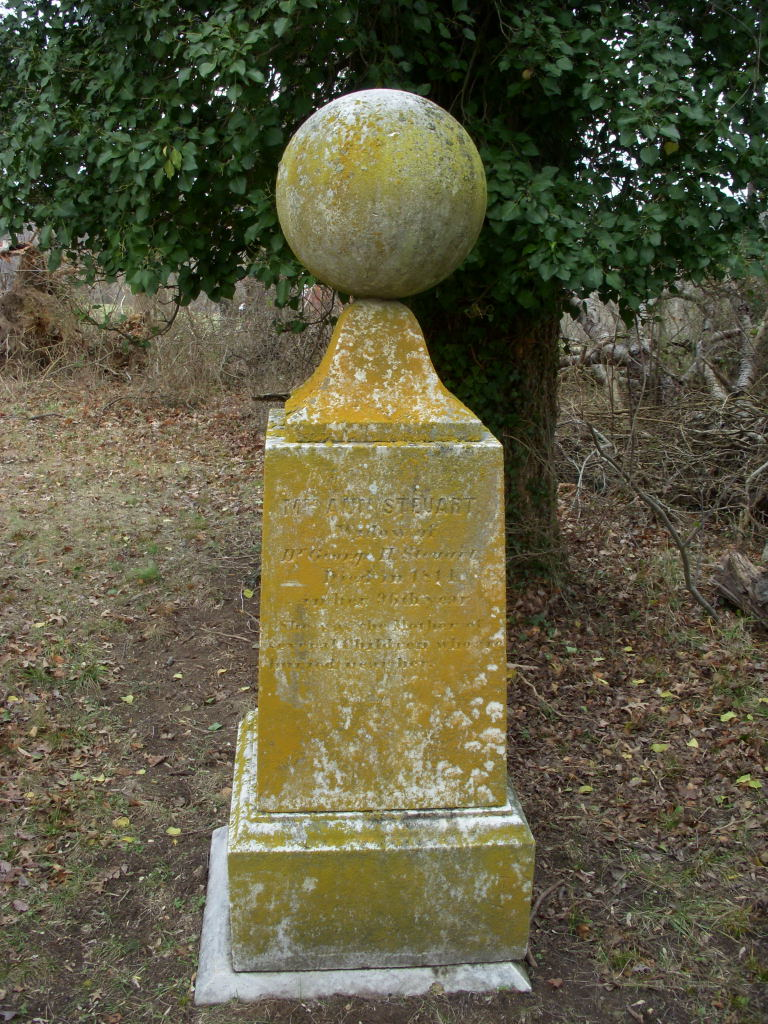
Obelisk at Dodon, marking the burial place of Steuart's widow Anne Digges.

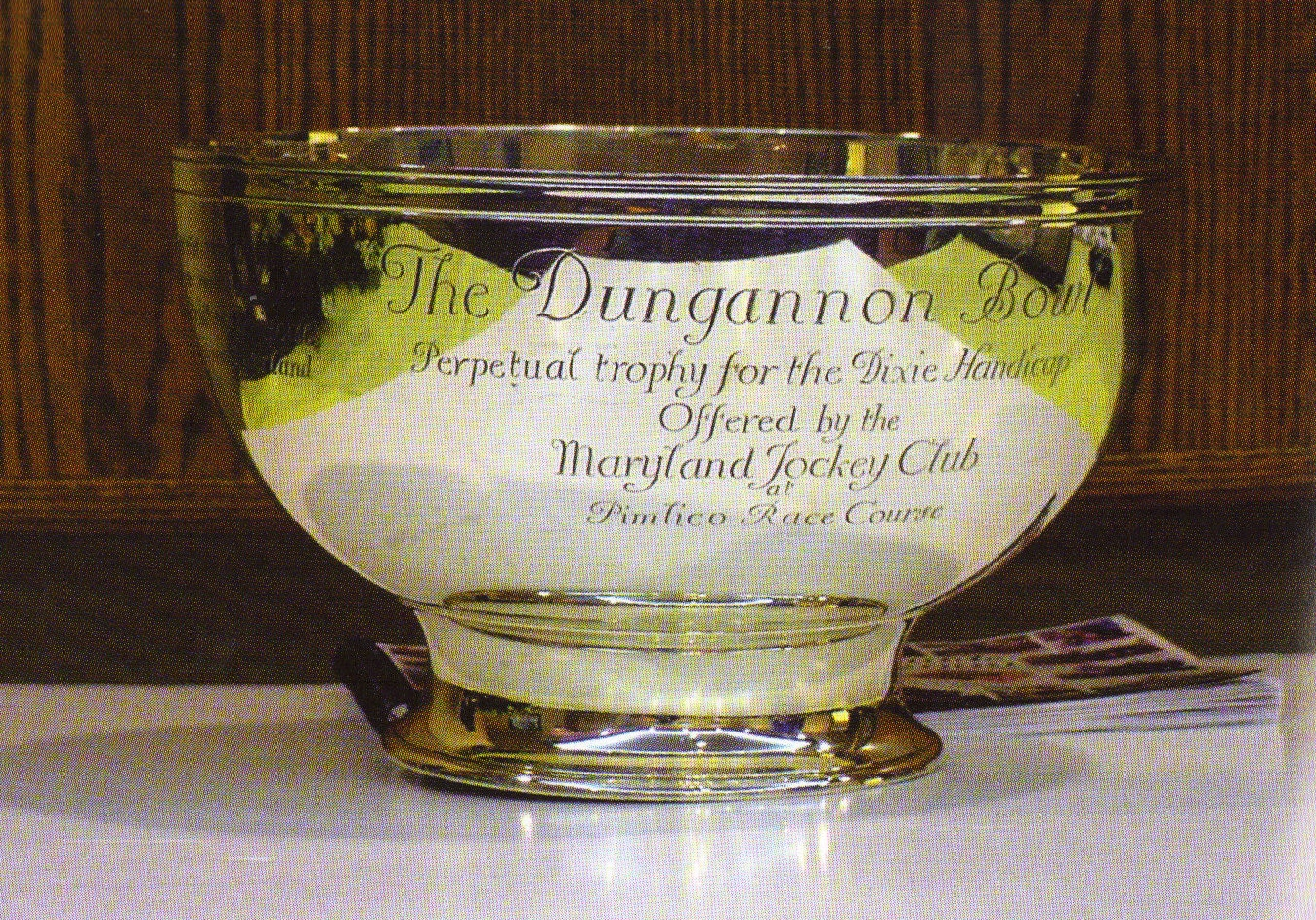
The Dungannon Bowl, a 1955 replica of the original Annapolis Subscription Plate, awarded to the winner of the annual Dixie Stakes.

A stone obelisk at Dodon marks the burial place of Ann Digges and a number of other family members. The farm estate, somewhat reduced in size, still remains home to Steuart's descendants today.

The unusual spelling of "Steuart" was widespread in the 18th century ("Steuart", "Stewart" and "Stuart" being essentially interchangeable), but has since mainly fallen into disuse. However, Steuart's numerous North American descendants have retained the archaic spelling.

A silver replica of the original Annapolis Subscription Plate was commissioned in 1955 by the Maryland Jockey Club. The "Dungannon Bowl" is a perpetual trophy presented to the winner of annual Dixie Stakes, the oldest stakes race run in Maryland and the Mid-Atlantic states.

== See also ==
- Colonial government in the Thirteen Colonies
- Colonial families of Maryland
- List of mayors of Annapolis, Maryland
- Loyalist (American Revolution)
- Province of Maryland
- Steuart family
