= John L. Carey =

American writer

- Died: December 1852; New Orleans, Louisiana
- Occupations: Writer, newspaper editor, politician
- Writing career
- Period: Antebellum South
- Genres: Journalism, essays

John L. Carey was a member of the General Assembly of Maryland in 1843 and a newspaper editor in Maryland in the years leading up to the American Civil War. He is known for his writing on the question of slavery, which was a subject in a number of his letters and books. He was editor of the American and Commercial Daily Advertiser in Baltimore for twelve years.

In 1845, physician and planter Richard Sprigg Steuart published an open letter to Carey in Baltimore, addressing the slavery question. Carey and Steuart were both members of the Maryland State Colonization Society, believing that free American blacks should be resettled in an African colony.

== Career ==
Carey wrote a number of letters, books and essays on the subject, including Slavery in Maryland - Briefly Considered, published in Baltimore in 1845. Carey's conflicted position on slavery reflected the wider division of attitudes in Maryland prior to the Civil War. On one hand, Carey could not imagine a world in which the two races coexisted peacefully in liberty and, like many other Southerners, he deeply resented the pressure from Northern abolitionists. On the other hand, he sought a solution to the problem of slavery through peaceful resettlement of former slaves and free blacks in Africa. Carey was a member of the Maryland State Colonization Society, an organization formed to "return", more accurately, relocate free black Americans (most of whom were native to the United States, often for generations) to the west coast of Africa, in what is today Liberia.

Carey was editor of the Baltimore American & Commercial Daily Advertiser for 12 years. Hired by the Crescent newspaper, he moved to New Orleans.

== Death ==
He died from cholera in New Orleans in December 1852. He had moved there to become editor of the Crescent.

== Published works ==
- Some Thoughts Concerning Domestic Slavery, Baltimore (1838)
- Slavery in Maryland - Briefly Considered, Baltimore (1845)
- Slavery and the Wilmot Proviso; With Some Suggestions for a Compromise (c1846)
