= Billy Stewart (Australian footballer) =

Australian rules footballer (1884–1968)

Personal information
- Full name: William Alexander Stewart
- Born: 3 August 1884; Shelbourne, Victoria
- Died: 16 April 1968 (aged 83); Ballarat, Victoria
- Original team: Kerang
- Height: 178 cm (5 ft 10 in)
- Weight: 81 kg (179 lb)
- Position: Defence

Playing career^{1}
| Years | Club | Games (Goals) |
| 1905–09 | St Kilda | 46 (10) |
- ^{1} Playing statistics correct to the end of 1909.

William Alexander Stewart (3 August 1884 – 16 April 1968) was an Australian rules footballer who played with St Kilda in the Victorian Football League (VFL). Stewart also played for the Victorian team at the 1908 Melbourne Carnival, replacing an injured player. He played his last VFL game in a victory against Geelong, before transferring to Prahran in the Victorian Football Association. He would later also play for North Ballarat. Serving for Australia in World War I, he spent time as a Prisoner of war in Germany.
