= William Stewart (footballer, born 1897) =

Scottish footballer

Personal information
- Full name: William Thomson Stewart
- Date of birth: 30 April 1897
- Place of birth: Bridgeton, Scotland
- Date of death: November 23, 1974 (aged 77)
- Place of death: Glasgow, Scotland
- Position: Centre half

Senior career*
Years	Team	Apps	(Gls)
1919–1921	Queen's Park	4	(0)
- Shawfield
- * Club domestic league appearances and goals

William Thomson Stewart (17 January 1887 – 23 November 1974) was a Scottish amateur footballer who played in the Scottish League for Queen's Park as a centre half.

== Personal life ==
Stewart served as a private in the Highland Light Infantry during the First World War.

== Career statistics ==
Appearances and goals by club, season and competition
Club	Season	League			National Cup		Other		Total	
Club	Season	Division	Apps	Goals	Apps	Goals	Apps	Goals	Apps	Goals
Queen's Park	1919–20	Scottish First Division	0	0	0	0	1 (Note: Appearance in Glasgow Merchants Charity Cup)	0	1	0
Queen's Park	1920–21	Scottish First Division	4	0	0	0	0	0	4	0
Career total			4	0	0	0	1	0	5	0
