= William Stuart (cricketer, born 1871) =

Australian cricketer

Personal information
- Full name: William Percy Stuart
- Born: 7 March 1871; Goolwa, South Australia
- Died: 20 August 1956 (aged 85); Unley Park, South Australia
- Batting: Right hand bat
- Role: Batsman

Domestic team information
- Years: Team
- 1899/00–1908/09: South Australia

Career statistics
Competition	First-class
Matches	8
Runs scored	158
Batting average	13.60
100s/50s	–/–
Top score	38
Balls bowled	–
Wickets	–
Bowling average	–
5 wickets in innings	–
10 wickets in match	–
Best bowling	–
Catches/stumpings	–/–
- Source: Cricinfo, 28 September 2020

William Stuart (7 March 1871 – 20 August 1956) was an Australian cricketer. He played in eight first-class matches for South Australia between 1899 and 1909.

== See also ==
- List of South Australian representative cricketers
