= Argaty =

Coordinates: 56.204°N 4.037°W

Painting of Argaty house, as it appeared when it was inherited by George Hume Steuart of Annapolis, Maryland, in 1758.

Argaty is a farm estate located just over a mile northeast of Doune, Stirling, Scotland. The present Argaty House dates from the 19th century with baronial additions in the 1860s and 1920s, but was largely destroyed by fire in April 2011.

Argaty farm is host to central Scotland's only red kite feeding station where visitors can come and watch the birds, recently reintroduced to their former natural habitat through a program managed by the RSPB and Scottish Natural Heritage.

In 1982 ownership of Argaty House and the farm estate were separated.

== History ==
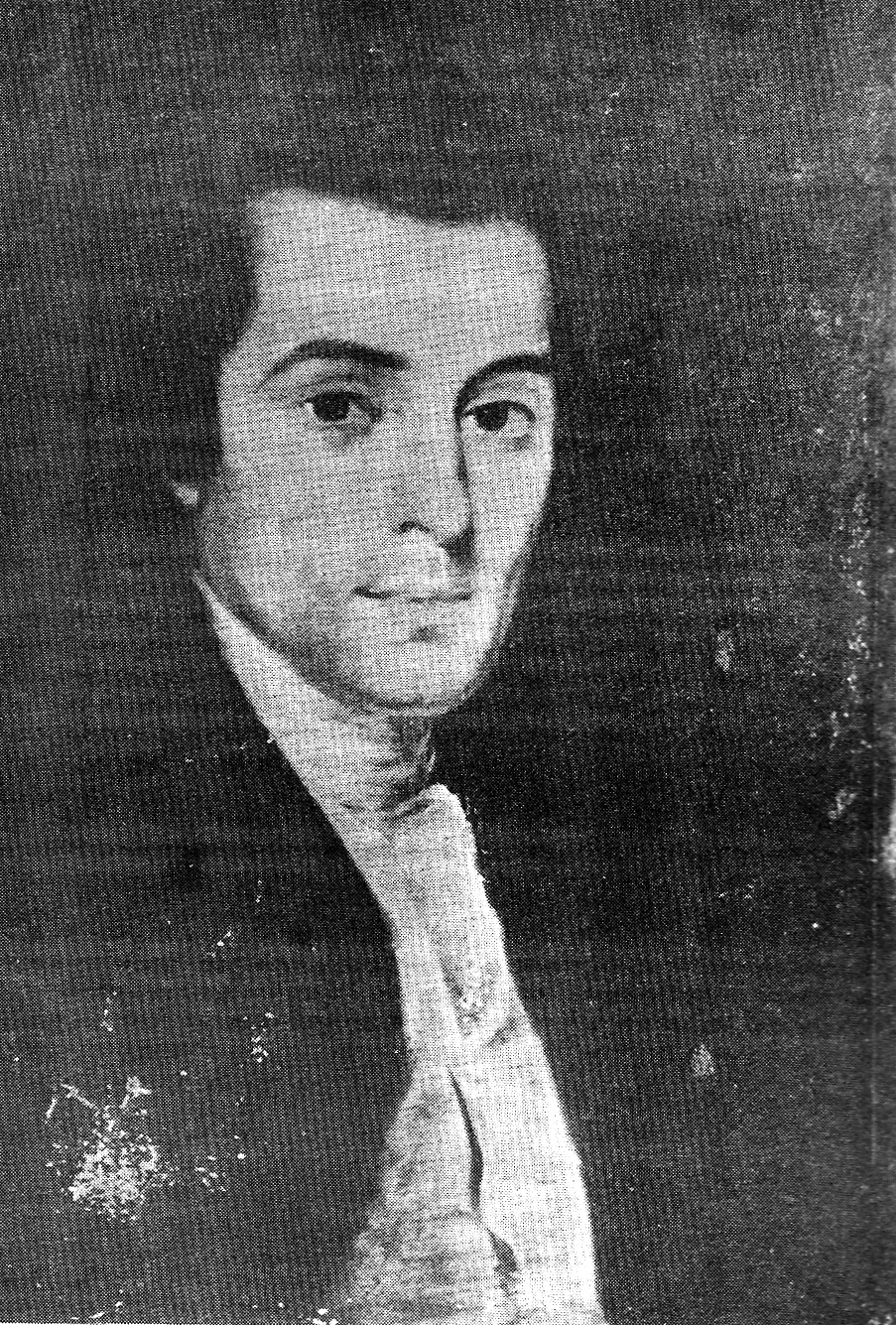
George Steuart Hume inherited Argaty in the late 1700s

=== Origins ===
Argaty (a.k.a. "Ardgaty"), derives from the Gaelic words aird, meaning "height", and gaoth, meaning "wind" and therefore translates as "windy height".

=== Medieval era ===
Argaty was originally part of the Doune estate, property of the Dukes of Albany, ancestors of the Clan Stewart of Balquhidder. When Murdoch Stewart, Duke of Albany was executed for treason by King James I of Scotland in 1425, the Stewart lands were forfeited to the Crown, and Argaty was among the forfeited properties.

After the forfeiture the Crown granted the lands of Argaty to one John Sinclair, Esquire to the King's Chamber. The property then passed to Sinclair's younger daughter who married Patrick Home (also spelled "Hume") of Polworth, and Argaty thus came into the possession of the Home family.

=== 17th century ===
The house was remodelled by Tobias Bauchop of Alloa in 1687.

=== 18th century ===
Around 150 years later the property was again inherited by a daughter, one Mary Hume, who married George Stewart (also spelled "Steuart") of Ballachallan. George Stewart was a descendant of Murdoch Stewart, Duke of Albany and, by this marriage, the ownership of Argaty returned to the descendants of the very same Stewarts who had forfeited it some three centuries earlier.

In 1758 Argaty was inherited by the Maryland planter and Loyalist politician George Hume Steuart of Annapolis, Maryland, second son of George Steuart and Mary Hume. Steuart also held extensive lands in Maryland and, at the outbreak of the Revolutionary War in 1775, he was forced to leave America and return to Scotland, dividing his estates among his family. His son, also named George Hume Steuart (1747–1788), inherited Argaty estate in his turn, changing his name to George Steuart Hume.

On Hume's death in 1788, Argaty passed to George Steuart Hume's infant daughter Sophia. Hume's younger brothers Charles and James Steuart, by now citizens of the fledgling United States of America, brought a claim against their infant niece Sophia for the inheritance of Argaty, but were not successful.

=== 19th century ===
Sophia Hume married her cousin, David Monro Binning of Softlaw, a barrister, and by the early Nineteenth century the house and estate were in the possession of the Binning-Home family. Later in the 19th century the house was extensively re-modelled.

A shorthorn bull named Alban, raised by Mr G. H. M. Binning-Home of Argaty and calved in 1868, appears in Coate's Herd Book, Volume 19, the publication of the Shorthorn Society of the United Kingdom. At this time the estate acquired something of a name for breeding shorthorn cattle.

=== 20th century ===
In the 20th century ownership of the estate passed through a number of hands. Mr and Mrs Henderson bought Argaty in 1916. Their daughter and son-in-law, Mr D.C. Bowser and Mrs M. Bowser, eventually inherited and ran the estate. From 1947 to 1986 the estate was run by a Capt. D. Bowser. In 1982 ownership of Argaty House and the estate were separated.

== Argaty today ==
Today Mr Niall Bowser and his wife Lynn run the estate from Lerrocks Farm. Argaty farm is host to central Scotland's only red kite feeding station where visitors can come and watch the birds, recently reintroduced to their former natural habitat through a program managed by the RSPB and Scottish Natural Heritage.

Administratively Doune is today under the control of Stirling Council.

On 30 April 2011 a fire broke out in Argaty House, almost completely gutting it. The Central Scotland Fire and Rescue Service estimated the next day that 90% of the building was totally destroyed.

Argaty House, Lodge and grounds were purchased in 2022. It is now a private family home. There is no access to the ruin of Argaty House which is protected by security measures due to its hazardous condition.
