= Auchenbowie House =

House in Stirling, Scotland

Coordinates: 56°03′52″N 3°55′52″W

Auchenbowie House is a laird's house (mansion) in Stirling, Scotland. The location is about 3.5 miles (5.6 km) south of Stirling, on minor road west of the A872 west of the M80 at Auchenbowie.

The land here was bought by Robert Bruce, Provost of Stirling (descendant of The Bruce) in 1555. The Laird's House was built during the 17th century, 1666 according to one source. According to The Times, it was "built as an L-plan towerhouse ... extended in 1768 and again in the 19th century to create a capacious nine-bedroom, four-bathroom property".

The house was later expanded and remodelled in 1768, and again in the 19th century. It's located in the Stirling region of Auchenbowie.

It passed through marriage to the Munro family in 1708 after a member of the Bruce family had to flee Scotland following the killing of a man in a duel. The Munro family were the owners in 1787 when Robert Burns, the Scots national makar (or poet) stayed and wrote in his journal about dining with the Munro of the day who was also a poet.

Former British Prime Minister, Winston Churchill, also stayed at the House when visiting a niece that had married into the Munro family.

On September 5, 1973, it was designated a category A listed building.

Little has been written about recent owners, but The Times indicated that Connie and Robert Donnelly had moved in 2012.

A report about the House in 2019 stated that "the original L-shaped plan remains essentially intact" and added that it has been remodeled, then featuring nine bedrooms, stables and tennis courts.

Connie and Robert Donnelly moved into the property in 2006 and subsequently sold in 2022. During this period a considerable portion of the Auchenbowie Estate was sold including part of Barr Wood.

In December 2022 a group of four young Asian entrepreneurs headed by Chen Li purchased Auchenbowie House. Li was born in Beijing but moved to Scotland in 1998, her business is an inbound tour operator who focused on provide luxury travel arrangements to the Chinese high net worth population to the UK, she also owns two hotels in the central belt of Scotland, but her main residence is at the Auchenbowie House.

The interior of the house is still in good condition although the exterior and the surrounding gardens and lands have been neglected. The old walled garden was converted into a riding school and stables in the 1960’s but has fallen into disrepair and all traces of the garden have disappeared.

Li and her fellow investors have embarked on a long term project to restore and improve the property. Part of this project is to sympathetically convert part of the old walled garden into a small private distillery, restoring much of the surrounding garden with new plantings including many botanicals. All the planning and restoration is based around a net zero carbon approach, and the revenues from the distillery will be used to further enhance and improve the Auchenbowie Estate. As part of this project, Li has commissioned a full historical investigation and report into the history of Auchenbowie.
