= William G. Stewart (Florida politician) =

Florida state legislator during Reconstruction

Member of the Florida House of Representatives
- In office 1871–1875
- Constituency: Leon County

Personal details
- Occupation: Cashier at Freedmen's Bank; City clerk and treasurer

William G. Stewart was a state legislator in Florida. He was a member of the A.M.E. Church. He represented Leon County.

William G is not to be confused with another man, William Steward. Steward was the cashier at the Freedmen's Bank from 1871 to 1875 and also served as City Clerk-Treasurer in 1871 and Leon County Tax Assessor in 1872. Due to the similar names, these two men are often confused. He served in the Florida House of Representatives in 1873. From 1873 to 1886 he was a postmaster in Tallah. Ellen Call Long supported Rev. Stewart as a candidate for postmaster drawing the ire of white supremacists. Copies of her book Florida Breezes were destroyed in protest of the views she expressed.

== See also ==
- African American officeholders from the end of the Civil War until before 1900
