= Dodon (farm) =

Coordinates: 38°53′35″N 76°37′32″W

Dodon Farm
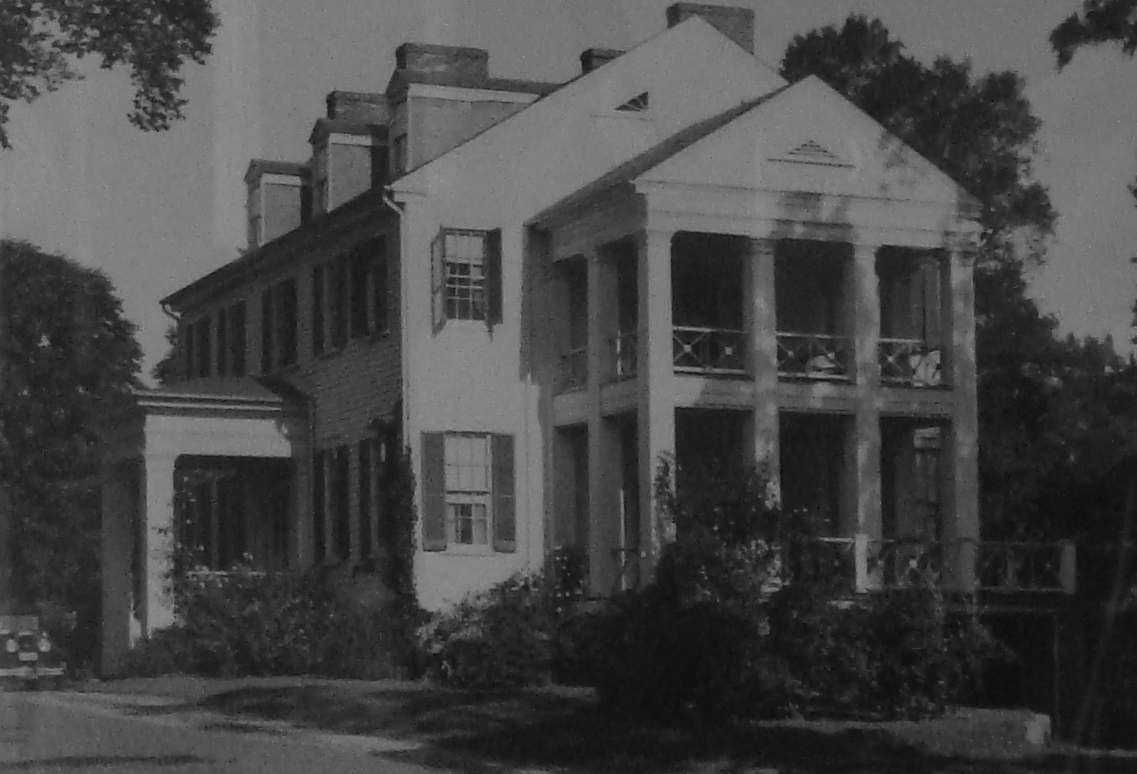
- Plantation house at Dodon, built c. 1800 to replace the original house which was destroyed by fire. This house in turn burned down c. 1953.
- Alternative names: Doden

General information
- Type: Mansion
- Architectural style: Georgian, Victorian
- Location: Anne Arundel County, Davidsonville, Maryland, United States
- Construction started: Late 17th century
- Destroyed: destroyed by fire c. 1790s, again c. 1953

Technical details
- Structural system: Timber frame, brick

Dodon, (aka "Doden") is a 550-acre (2.2 km^{2}) farm and former forced-labor tobacco plantation near Davidsonville, Maryland, located near the South River about 10 miles (16 km) south west of Annapolis. Purchased in 1747 by the planter and politician Dr George H. Steuart, it remains the home of Steuart's descendants to this day. Steuart grew wealthy during the colonial era thanks to proprietorial patronage and the forced labor of enslaved people.

== History ==
Memoirs written by Richard Sprigg Steuart suggest that Dodon was originally patented to one James Stewart in 1669, a Scottish immigrant from Perth. However, land records held by Anne Arundel County show that it was originally owned by a Dr Francis Stockett, who "held 'Dodon', 664 acres", in 1668. Whatever its early origins, the property was thereafter owned by the Warman family and, in 1747, Stephen Warman sold it to Dr George H. Steuart (1700–1784) of Argaty, Perthshire, Scotland. At Dodon, Steuart enslaved people to farm the profitable cash crop of tobacco.

As one of the earliest members of the Maryland Jockey Club, Steuart was a horse racing enthusiast. His most famous horse was Dungannon, which he imported from England to compete against the stable of his rival Charles Carroll. The Annapolis Subscription Plate, the first recorded formal horse race in Maryland, was held in May 1743, and was won by Dungannon. The silver cup — actually more of a bowl than a plate — is now displayed in the Baltimore Museum of Art. It is the oldest surviving silver object made in Maryland and the second-oldest horse racing trophy in America.

Steuart held a number of colonial offices, including Mayor of Annapolis from 1759 to 1763. He was also Commissioner of the Land Office, served at the Court of Admiralty, and was appointed Lieutenant-Colonel of The Horse Militia in 1753 by Governor Horatio Sharpe.

Dodon formed a small part of the overall plantation economy of the Southern States, which forced enslaved people to produce cotton, tobacco, and other cash crops for export to England. Maryland planters also made extensive use of indentured servants and penal labor. An extensive system of rivers facilitated the movement of produce from inland plantations to the Atlantic coast for export. Baltimore was the second-most important port in the 18th-century South, after Charleston, South Carolina.

== Revolutionary War ==
Steuart also inherited land in Perthshire, Scotland, which caused him considerable political difficulties during the American Revolutionary War. Loyalty to the Revolution would have caused him to forfeit his Scottish estates, and, at the outbreak of hostilities, Steuart left America for Scotland. He thereafter divided his estates, giving Dodon to his wife Ann (née Digges), with instructions on which of his children, loyal to the new American nation, would inherit. Steuart himself would never return to Maryland or see his family again. Ann remained at Dodon until her death in 1811. According to letters of her Grandson Richard Sprigg Steuart (1797–1876), she lived "comfortably, but she kept at home because her good husband was called by the mob a Tory."

== Civil War ==
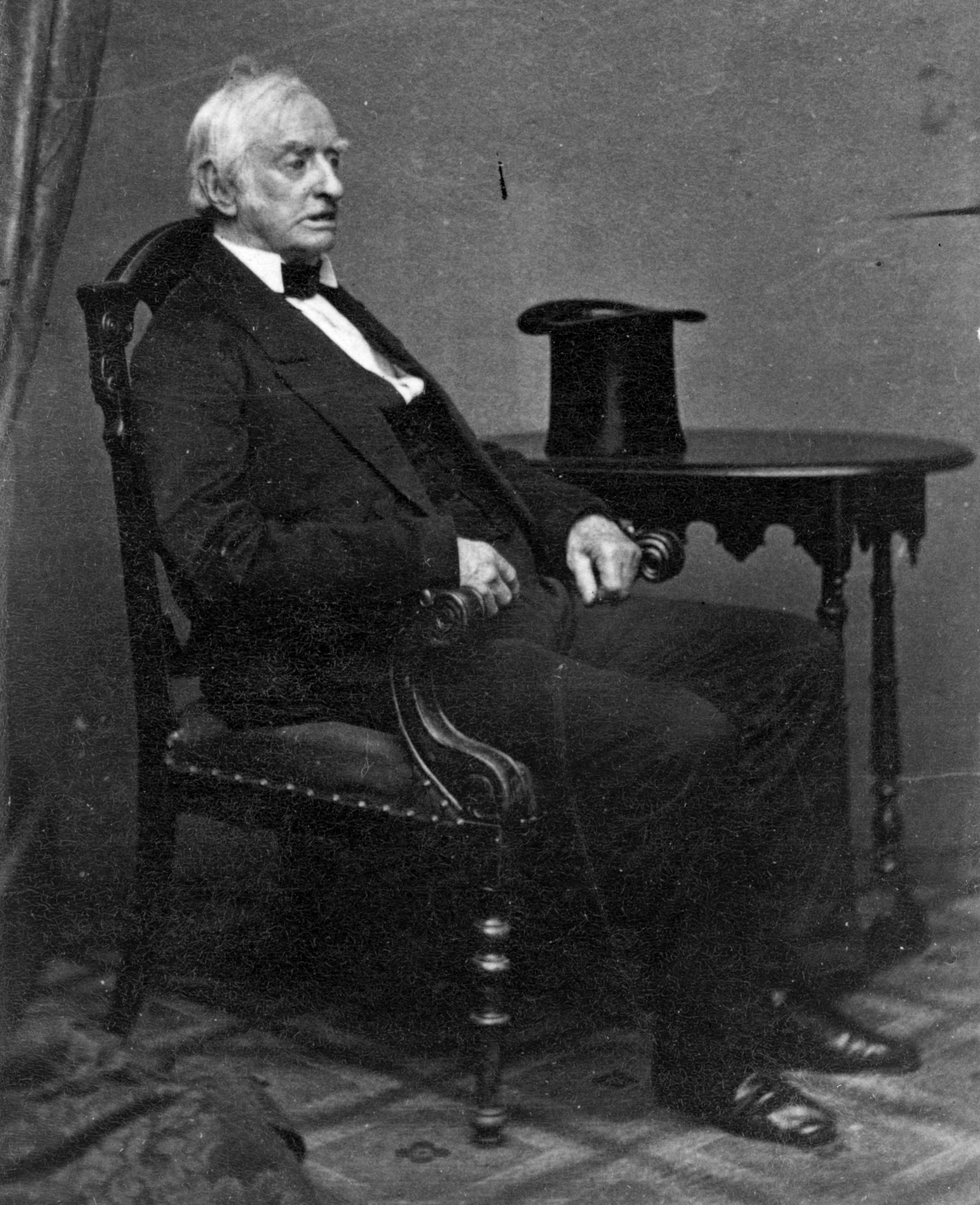
Richard Sprigg Steuart, who inherited Dodon in 1838. Steuart was sympathetic to the Confederacy and smuggled horses and quinine south to Confederate forces.

In November 1838, Maryland physician Richard Sprigg Steuart inherited Dodon from his Uncle William Steuart. At that time the forced-labor farm comprised around 1,600 acres (6.5 km^{2}) of land worked by about 150 enslaved people. The outbreak of the American Civil War in 1861 found the Steuart family sympathetic to the Southern cause, though Maryland did not secede from the Union (pre-war loyalties in Maryland were divided between North and South, but the Northern cause prevailed). Horses were raised and trained at Dodon then smuggled south for Confederate forces, as well as medical supplies such as quinine. As a result, Dodon was often raided by Union troops, regularly forcing Steuart to flee into hiding. As one family member later recalled:

Dr Steuart was constantly away from home, avoiding the raiding parties from the Northern soldiers who sought to capture him, because of the help he gave the South by secretly sending supplies of quinine, and other necessities...to the Southern hospitals. Wakened...in the dead of night, [his wife Maria] dressed quietly and...admitted the Northern soldiers, and then stealing past the sentries, walked half a mile to the quarters, and sent a trusty messenger to warn his master not to return. Old William Hawkins, when a soldier put a pistol to his head saying 'tell us where your master is', replied 'I'd rather be dead than tell'.

Steuart's nephew, Brigadier Gen. George H. Steuart (known as "Maryland Steuart" to distinguish him from his fellow General J.E.B. Stuart) fought at a number of major battles including Spotsylvania, Gettysburg, Cross Keys, and Winchester, before surrendering with General Lee at Appomattox Court House.

== Post-war period ==
The estate did not prosper after the war's end, in large part because the white owners could no longer enslave Black people for their labor. In 1890 Isabel and Emily Steuart, daughters of Richard Sprigg Steuart, donated the estate to the Roman Catholic Congregation of Marist Fathers, a French order founded in Lyon in 1826, to be used as a seminary and mission. However, it was eventually repurchased by a member of the Steuart family, Annette Steuart Wise, in 1929.

Tobacco farming at Dodon ended in the 1940s.

== Legacy ==
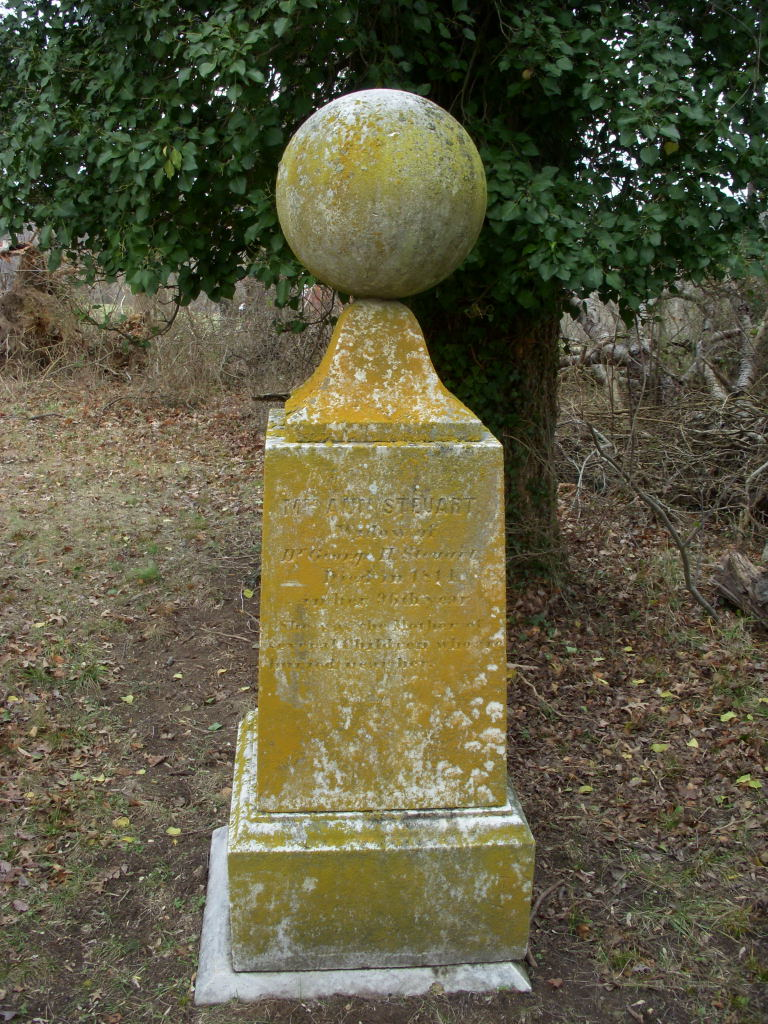
Stone obelisk marking Dodon burial ground, erected by Richard Sprigg Steuart.

Dodon is home to the ninth generation of Steuarts today, who continue to farm, and to breed and train horses, as well as grow grapes and make wine. The Annapolis Subscription Plate has also been revived in recent years. Parts of the original house still remain, though most was destroyed in a fire c1950.

Dodon is not far from the expanding suburbs of Annapolis, and the remaining land has now been put into preservation through the Maryland Agricultural Land Preservation Foundation, in order to prevent future development.

A family graveyard, marked by a small obelisk listing the names of Steuart kin resting there, sits in a grove of trees on one of the high spots of the property.

The name Dodon is said to come from the French, "Dieu Donne" meaning "Gift of God." It may also be a derivative of the Greek, Dodona - a prehistoric oracle in Greece dedicated to Zeus and the "mother goddess," Dione.

== See also ==
- Tulip Hill
