= William James Stewart (businessman) =

William James Stewart (20 March 1855 – 15 February 1924) was a businessman of Northam, Western Australia, and served for two years as mayor of that city.

== History ==
Stewart was born in Bishop Street, Dublin, in 1855 and emigrated with his parents William Stewart (c. 1802 – 12 October 1894) and Eliza Stewart (c. 1812 – 8 October 1905) to Western Australia in 1857. After some eighteen months, they moved to South Australia, where young William was educated at King's Grammar School in Port Adelaide, then under Rev. W. S. Moore at his school in Pulteney Street. After leaving school, he spent two years in a solicitor's office before working for a draper. He secured a position with G. & R. Wills & Co. as commercial traveller, which he held for six years, when he was appointed the firm's representative in Western Australia, and in 1885 opened the firm's first warehouse in that state. After two years in that position he joined George Throssell in his company Throssell and Son, storekeepers and general merchants of Toodyay and Northam. After a short stay in Northam, the firm having bought the businesses Dempster Bros, and C. S. Monger of Newcastle, Stewart was put in charge of the new acquisitions. While in Newcastle he took an active interest in civic affairs of the town and district, and was so highly regarded that he was elected Mayor of the town. In 1891 he was appointed Justice of the Peace.

The Northam business continued to grow, and in 1896 Stewart was brought there to take over the management of the firm. He was again conspicuous in promoting the interests of the town and district, holding a seat on the Boards of Education in Newcastle and Northam, and for nine years was chairman. He continued to serve as Justice of the Peace, and for a time acted as Resident Magistrate. He was elected mayor in 1901.

== Church ==
He was an active supporter of the Methodist Church, and involved in the opening of the church's mission to the goldfields. He was a member of the W.A. Methodist Conference from its inception in 1900, and prior to that represented his district at the Perth Synod. He was a member of the Perth Wesley Church Trust, and for some years State Treasurer of the Foreign Mission Fund.

== Family ==
William James Stewart married Annie Emma Jane Clark (c. 1858 – 27 January 1930) in Walkerville, South Australia on 19 May 1880. Their family included:

- (Charles) Keable Stewart (6 April 1881 – 26 October 1933) married Ivy Busch ( – ) on 18 September 1907; they lived at Maylands. Her sister was Daisy Busch. Keable attended Prince Alfred College, Adelaide, with H. V. "Jimmy" Throssell.
- Walter Stewart (5 November 1882 – ) of East Perth
- Millicent Stewart (11 August 1884 – 6 January 1910)
- Eva Maggie Stewart (27 July 1886 – ) married Cecil Walter Davey (c. 1882 – 30 July 1945) on 23 September 1911, lived at Newcastle Road, Northam
- Clarice Muriel Stewart ( – ) married R. F. Marshall ( – ), lived at Cottesloe Beach, Buckland Hill
- Raymond Ellsmore "Ray" Stewart ( – ) married Pearl Estella Page ( – ) on 22 January 1913; they divorced in 1922.
- William Edward "Will" "Bill" Stewart (c. 1891 – 25 May 1949) married Gladys Hope Wesley Hastie ( – 26 December 1937) on 27 March 1918; lived at Subiaco, North Perth then Cunderdin
- (Annie) Edna Stewart ( – ) married Gladstone Jewell Flower ( – ) on 7 November 1918, lived at Northam, then Claremont

They had a home at "The Gables", 81 Duke Street, Northam.

He died aged 69 after an illness of some months' duration and is buried in Northam Cemetery.
