= Richard Sprigg Steuart =

American physician (1797–1876)

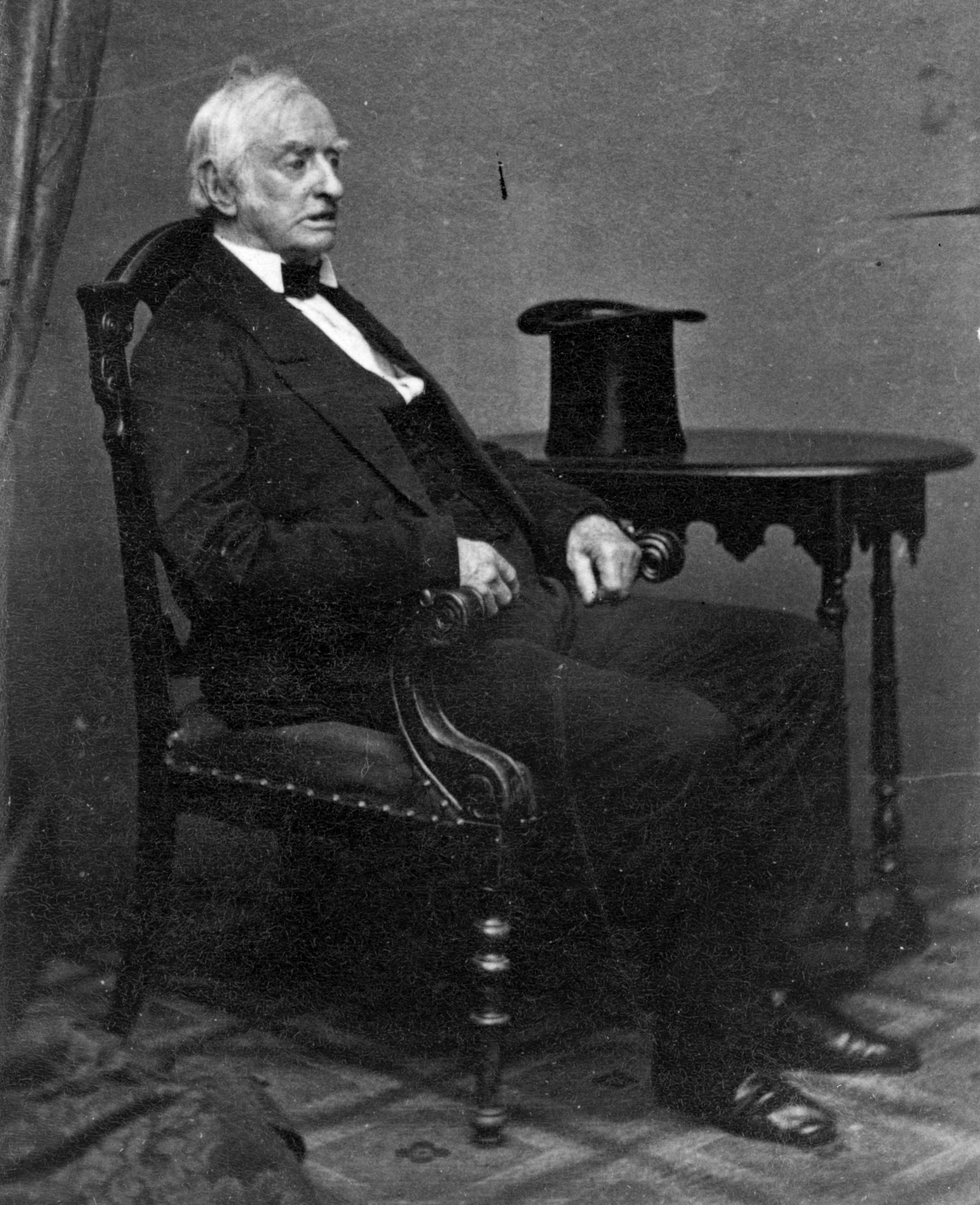
- Steuart in 1850
- Born: November 1797; Baltimore, Maryland
- Died: July 14, 1876 (aged 78); Dodon, Anne Arundel County, Maryland
- Education: St Mary's College, Baltimore
- Known for: Spring Grove Hospital Center
- Spouse: Maria Louisade Bernabeu (m. 1824)
- Relatives: George H. Steuart (politician), grandfather George H. Steuart (militia general) brother George H. Steuart (brigadier general) nephew.
- Medical career
- Profession: Physician, Planter
- Field: General medicine
- Institutions: Spring Grove Hospital Center
- Sub-specialties: Mental Illness

Richard Sprigg Steuart (November 1797 – July 14, 1876) was an American medical doctor and an early pioneer of the treatment of mental illness. In 1838 he inherited four contiguous farms, totalling approximately 1900 acres as well as 150 slaves. Steuart was instrumental in the expansion and modernisation of The Maryland Hospital for the Insane, today known as the Spring Grove Hospital Center. The expansion of the hospital, which Steuart considered his life's work, was authorized by the Maryland legislature in the 1850s and completed after the end of the Civil War.

At the start of the American Civil War, Steuart was relieved of his position as superintendent of the hospital because he refused to sign an oath of loyalty to the Union. Despite being a slave state, Maryland did not secede, and Federal troops entered the state to ensure it remained in the Union. A known Confederate sympathiser, Steuart remained a fugitive for much of the war, smuggling medical supplies to the South. At the war's end, Steuart was reinstated as superintendent at the hospital, and achieved the opening of the new building in 1872, continuing as superintendent almost until his death in 1876. Spring Grove continues to treat mental illness in the 21st century, and is the second oldest institution of its kind in the United States.

== Early life ==
Steuart was born in Baltimore, Maryland, in November 1797, a younger son of physician Dr James Steuart and his wife Rebecca. He was the fourth of eight siblings. Two died in infancy of scarlet fever. Steuart was raised at the family mansion at Maryland Square and educated at St Mary's College, Baltimore. Through his sister, Elizabeth Sprigg Steuart (1803-1896), he was the uncle of Charles William Kinsey (1829-1883), who served as a Virginia Congressman from 1882 to 1883, and was a Major in the Confederate Army, who was a friend of Gen. Stonewall Jackson, and was present at his death.

=== War of 1812 ===
During the War of 1812, at the age of seventeen, Steuart volunteered as aide-de-camp to the Washington Blues, a company of militia raised and commanded by his older brother, Captain (later Major General) George H. Steuart (1790–1867). He served at the Battle of North Point on September 12, 1814, where the Maryland Militia were able to hold off a British attack long enough to shore up the defense of Baltimore.

As he later recalled in his memoirs:

"I found my little knowledge of surgery very useful. One of the soldiers had been shot through the thigh wounding the femoral artory {sic}, so...I made a tourniquet, arresting the flow of blood, to place him in my wagon and bring him to the Maryland hospital. Here surgeon Gibson received him and finally amputated his leg."

== Medical career ==
Medicine case of Richard Sprigg Steuart.

After the war, Steuart began the study of law under Brigadier General William H. Winder. He had commanded the United States forces at the Battle of Bladensberg and was court-martialled afterward.

However, Steuart abandoned law in favor of medicine, which he studied under Dr William Donaldson in 1818 at Maryland Medical University. He graduated with his M.D. in 1822, publishing in the same year a work On the Action of Arteries. After graduation he went into partnership with Donaldson at his general medical practice in Baltimore for seventeen years. After Donaldson's death, Steuart succeeded to the practice.

Early on he began to specialize in the relatively neglected field of mental illness. In 1834 he became President of the Board of Visitors of the Maryland Hospital for the Insane.

In 1843 Steuart was elected to the Professorship of the Theory and Practice of Physic at the University of Maryland. Later, in 1848–49, and again from 1850–51, he served as president of the Medical and Chirurgical faculty of the State of Maryland.

By 1853 he was described by the American Journal of the Medical Sciences as "well known as one of the most eminent physicians of this city [of Baltimore]",

=== Maryland Hospital for the Insane ===
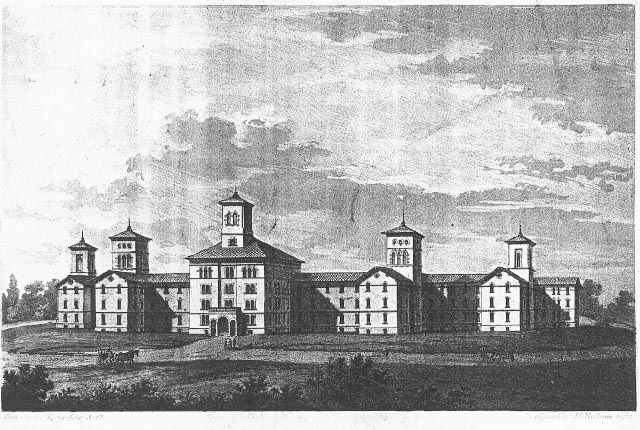
1853 architect's rendering of the new buildings for the Maryland Hospital for the Insane at Spring Grove.

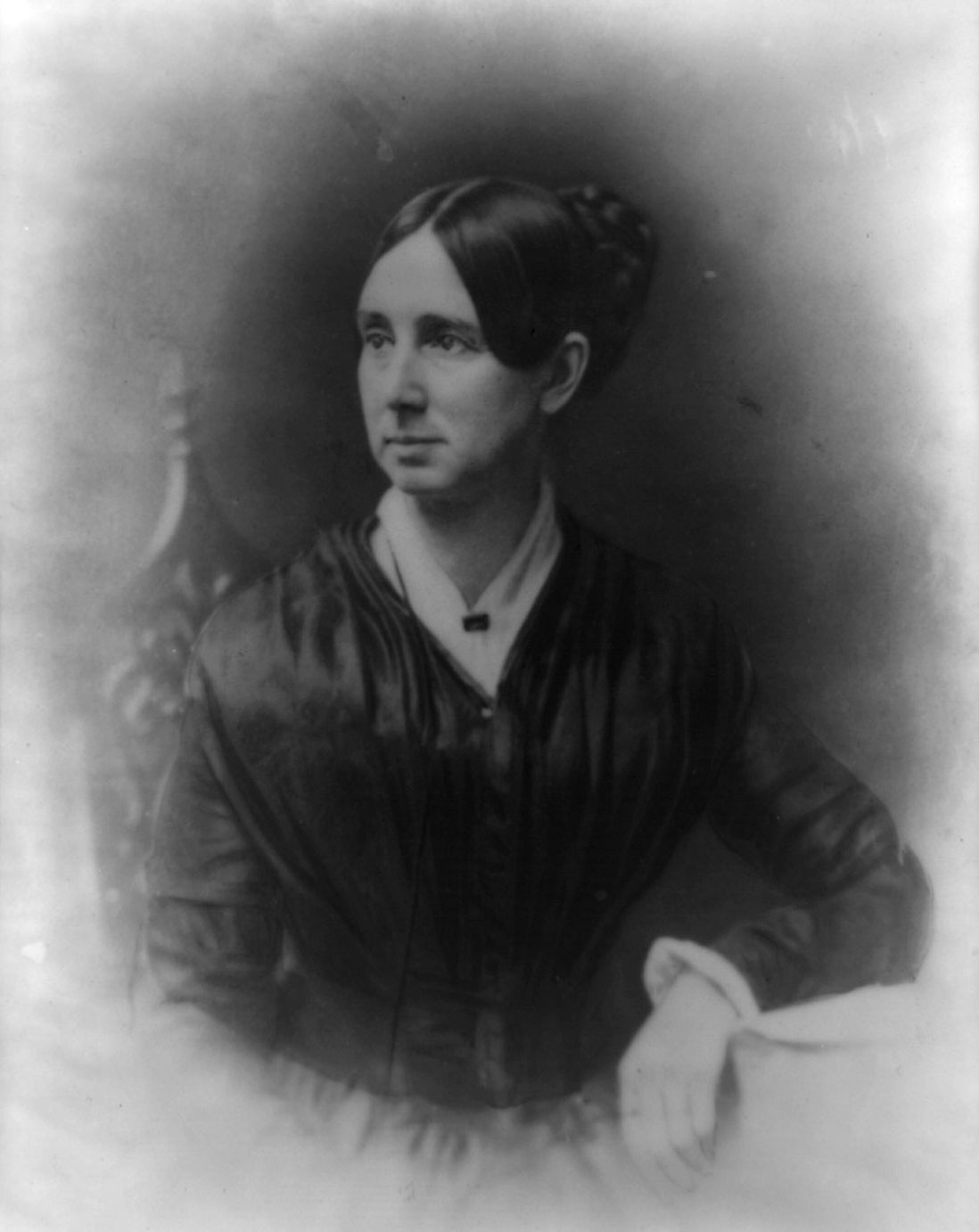
Dorothea Dix lobbied for reform of the treatment of mental illness in Maryland.

Steuart's most notable contribution to the field of mental illness was his work for the Maryland Hospital for the Insane (founded in 1797). He became President of the Board and Medical Superintendent, and its operations became his life's work. By the mid-nineteenth century, the hospital's bed capacity was no longer adequate, and Steuart managed to obtain authorization and funding from the Maryland General Assembly for the construction of a new, larger facility at Spring Grove. In co-operation with the social reformer Dorothea Dix, who in 1852 gave an impassioned speech to the Maryland legislature, Steuart chaired the committee known as the Commissioners for Erecting a Hospital for the Insane, that selected the Hospital's present site in Catonsville.

The cost of purchasing 136 acres (0.55 km^{2}) of land for the hospital was $14,000, of which $12,340 was raised through private contributions, with Steuart himself personally contributing $1,000, a very large sum at the time. The purchase was completed in 1853, but construction of the new buildings was delayed by the onset of the Civil War. The hospital was not finally completed until 1872, when it was described by one contemporary as "one of the largest and best appointed Insane Asylums in the United States".

Steuart's brother, Major General George H. Steuart, had two sons who suffered from mental illness. It is possible that circumstance was one of the causes of Steuart's particular interest in the treatment of mental illness and in Spring Grove Hospital.

== Tobacco planter and slaveholder ==
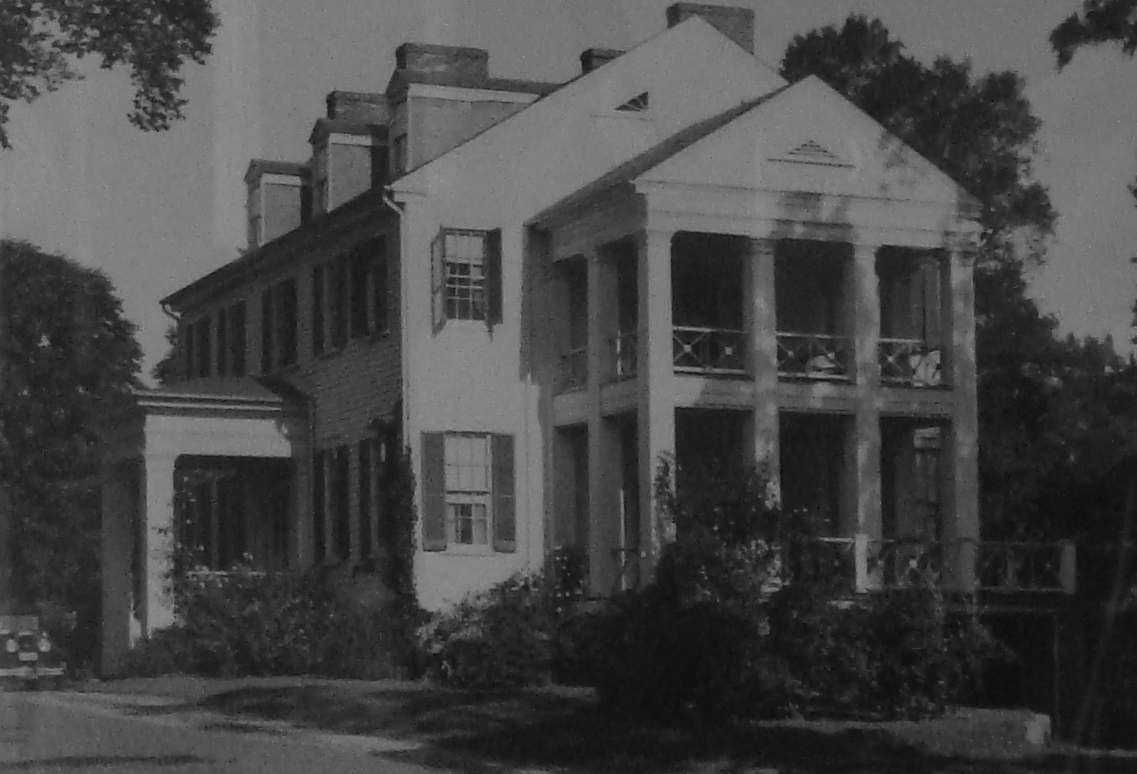
Steuart's Plantation house at Dodon, on the South River near Annapolis.

In 1842 Steuart inherited from his uncle William Steuart four large farms, comprising around 1,600 acres (6.5 km^{2}) of land and about 150 slaves, including Dodon, Obligation, Bridge Hill, and Fingall - all near the South River in Anne Arundel County, Maryland. Steuart's grandfather George H. Steuart had purchased and developed Dodon in 1747.

This inheritance made Steuart a wealthy landowner and a significant slaveholder in the state. As a result, Steuart gave up his general medical practice, after what he described as "23 years of hard professional life," in order to concentrate on managing his new plantation.

=== The problem of slavery ===
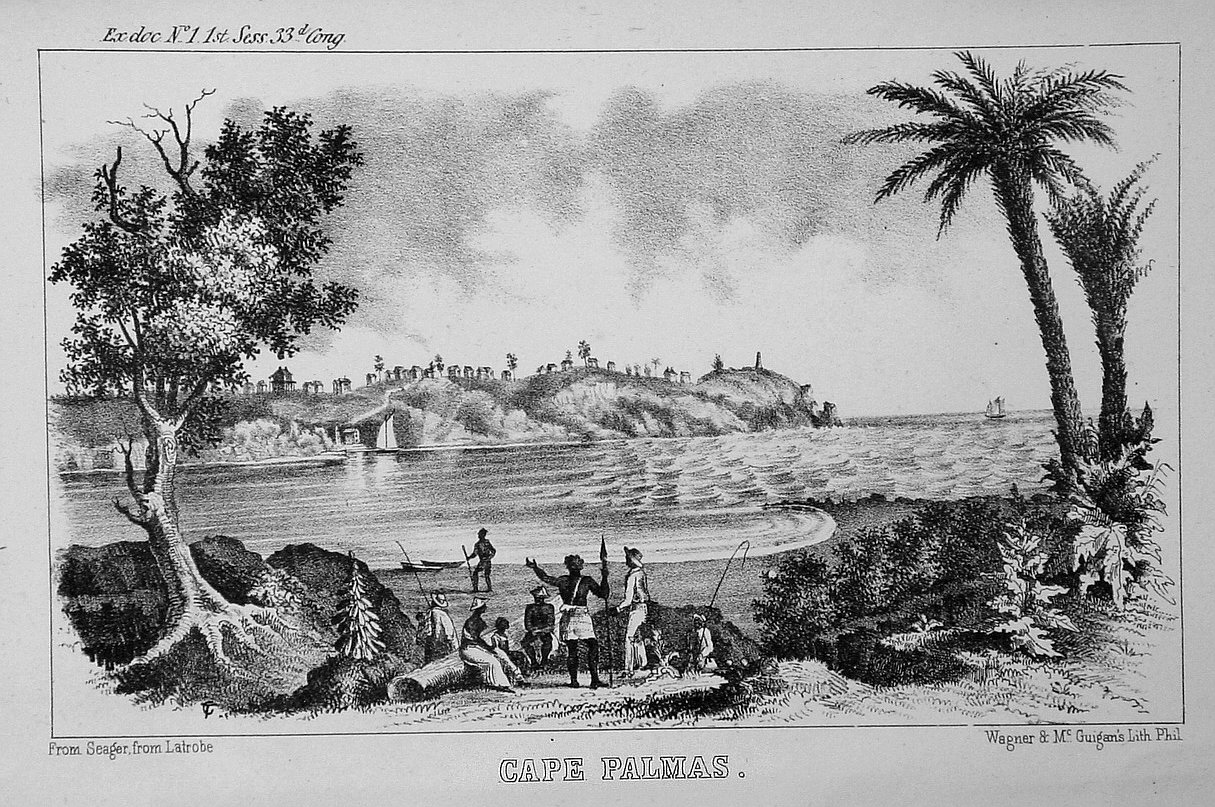
Cape Palmas, a colony for free blacks founded in Liberia by the Maryland State Colonization Society.

Like many Southern slaveholders, Steuart held conflicting views on the question of slavery. Although he recognized that the South's "peculiar institution" could not continue indefinitely, he was hostile to abolitionist efforts to mandate its end.

From 1828 Steuart had served on the Board of Managers of the Maryland State Colonization Society, of which Charles Carroll of Carrollton, one of the co-signers of the Declaration of Independence, was president. Steuart's father, James Steuart, was vice-president, and his brother George H. Steuart was also on the Board. The MSCS was a branch of the American Colonization Society, an organization dedicated to "returning" free black Americans to Africa, and specifically to found a colony for their resettlement, which developed as Liberia. By this time, most African Americans were native-born in the US, and many preferred to work for their civil rights there.

In an 1845 open letter to editor John L. Carey of the Commercial Daily Advertiser in Baltimore, published in the city by printer John Murphy, Steuart asked rhetorically:

"is there a man in Maryland, is there a single man connected with slavery who does not feel its existence to be a curse upon our beautiful land? Is there one who has not many a time...expressed a fond hope that he might live to witness...the entire exodus of the negro race from among us? If there is such a man, I have never met with him here...indeed it is impossible for a man of sound judgment and feelings...to behold the power and prosperity of Pennsylvania and Ohio...in comparison with our own state, and not feel the deepest regret for our deficiencies." Carey had himself written about the vexing question of slavery and also belonged to the Colonization Society.

Steuart was envious of the greater relative prosperity of the Northern States, and especially their much greater population growth. In Maryland, he argued, slavery held back economic progress:

"It is a matter of common observation that white laborers will not settle where slaves occupy the soil, however partially they may do so among free negroes. The white man shrinks from a union of labor with those who are regarded by their masters as an inferior race, and gradually he comes to regard labor itself as degrading, and fit only for those whom heaven has stamped with a color darker than his own."

Although he may have opposed the institution of slavery in principle, Steuart strongly resisted what he considered to be the radical agenda of the Abolitionists. Instead, he recommended voluntary emancipation by slave holders, and "repatriation" [with such terms, whites ignored that most African Americans were native to the US] to Africa of free black settlers:

"The colored man [must] look to Africa, as his only hope of preservation and of happiness...it will be found that this course of procedure...will...secure the removal of the great body of the African people from our State. The President of the Maryland Colonization Society says "the object of Colonization is to prepare a home in Africa for the free colored people of the State, to which they may remove when the advantages which it offers, and above all the pressure of irresistible circumstances in this country, shall excite them to emigrate."

Despite legislative efforts to reduce manumissions of slaves and forbid entry of free blacks into the state, by 1860, free blacks (many of them free people of color) made up 49% of the black population in the state.

== Civil War ==
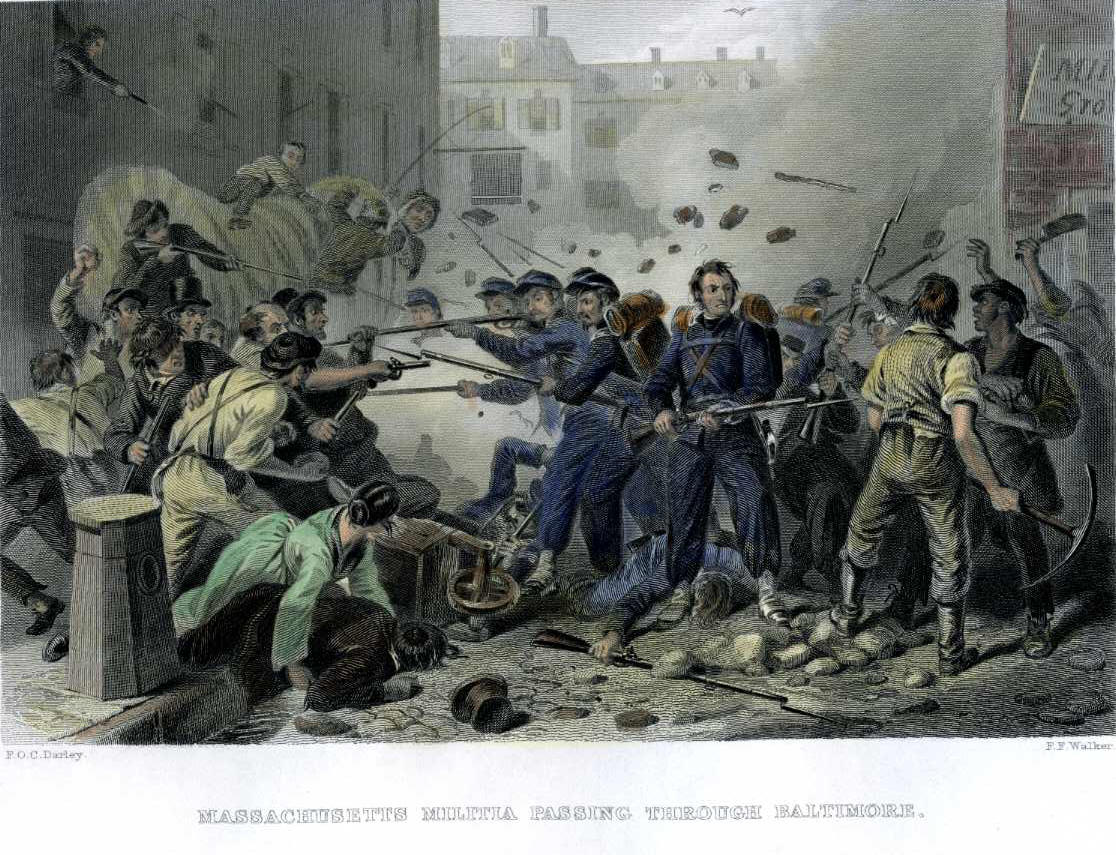
Baltimore riot of April 1861.

At the outbreak of the Civil War in 1861, Steuart and his family were sympathetic to the Southern cause. Maryland did not secede from the Union. Pre-war loyalties in Maryland were divided between North and South, but the Northern cause prevailed. In April, the city was shaken by the Baltimore riot of 1861, as Union soldiers were attacked who were traveling through the city by rail. Steuart wrote:

"I happened to be in Baltimore on the night of the 19th April 1861, and witnessed the outburst of feeling on the part of the people. Generally, when the Massachusetts troops were passing thru the city of Baltimore, it was evident to me that 75 p.c. of the population was in favour of repelling these troops. Instinctively the people seemed to look upon them as intruders, or as invaders of the South, not as defenders of the City of Baltimore. How or by whom the first blow was given can not be now ascertained, but the feeling of resistance was contagious and powerful. The Mayor of the City, nevertheless, thought it his duty to keep the peace and protect these troops in their passage thru Baltimore."

Steuart was among those who lobbied Governor Hicks to summon the state Legislature to vote on secession, following Hicks to Annapolis with a number of fellow citizens:

"to insist on his [Hicks] issuing his proclamation for the Legislature to convene, believing that this body (and not himself and his party) should decide the fate of our state"...if the Governor and his party continued to refuse this demand that it would be necessary to depose him". On April 22 Governor Hicks finally announced that the state legislature would meet in a special session in Frederick, Maryland, a strongly pro-Union town. In the end, Steuart's efforts to persuade Maryland to secede from the Union were in vain. On April 29, the Maryland Legislature voted 53–13 against secession. The state was swiftly occupied by Union soldiers to prevent any reconsideration.

=== Fugitive ===
The political situation remained uncertain until May 13, 1861 when Union troops occupied the state, restoring order and preventing a vote in favour of Southern secession, and by late summer Maryland was firmly in the hands of Union soldiers. Arrests of Confederate sympathizers soon followed, and Steuart's brother, Major General Steuart, fled to Charlottesville, Virginia, after which much of his family's property was confiscated by the Federal Government. The family's Baltimore residence, Maryland Square, was seized by the Union Army and Jarvis Hospital was soon erected on the grounds of the estate, to care for Federal wounded.

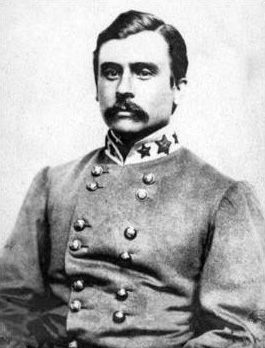
Steuart's nephew, Confederate Brigadier General George H. "Maryland" Steuart.

Dodon was not confiscated by the Union but, during the course of the war, horses were raised and trained and then smuggled south for Confederate forces, as well as medical supplies such as quinine. As a result, Dodon was often raided by Union troops, frequently forcing Steuart to flee into hiding. According to a family memoir:

"Dr Steuart was constantly away from home, avoiding the raiding parties from the Northern soldiers who sought to capture him, because of the help he gave the South by secretly sending supplies of quinine, and other necessities...to the Southern hospitals. Wakened...in the dead of night, [his wife Maria] dressed quietly and...admitted the Northern soldiers, and then stealing past the sentries, walked half a mile to the 'quarters', and sent a trusty messenger to warn his master not to return. Old William Hawkins, when a soldier put a pistol to his head saying 'tell us where your master is', replied 'I'd rather be dead than tell'."

Steuart's support for the Confederacy came at a high price. He was relieved of his duties at the Hospital after he refused to sign an oath of loyalty to the Union. Later that year, the Baltimore resident W W Glenn described Steuart as a fugitive from the authorities:

"I was spending the evening out when a footstep approached my chair from behind and a hand was laid upon me. I turned and saw Dr. R. S. Steuart. He has been concealed for more than six months. His neighbors are so bitter against him that he dare not go home, and he committed himself so decidedly on the 19th April and is known to be so decided a Southerner, that it [is] more than likely he would be thrown into a Fort. He goes about from place to place, sometimes staying in one county, sometimes in another and then passing a few days in the city. He never shows in the day time & is cautious who sees him at any time. He has several negroes in his confidence at different places."

=== After the war ===
After the war, in 1868, Steuart was eventually reinstated to the hospital as superintendent, and remained in charge when its operations moved to the newly completed hospital at Spring Grove in 1872, thereby living to see the fulfillment of his life's work and ambition. However, he was once again removed in 1875 when the board, under his leadership, mortgaged the hospital to a group of private investors, after the Maryland Legislature had failed to fully fund its operations.

He gave an address in 1876 to the Alumni Association of Maryland Medical University, but died the same year on July 13, and is buried at his family estate of Dodon in Maryland.

== Family ==
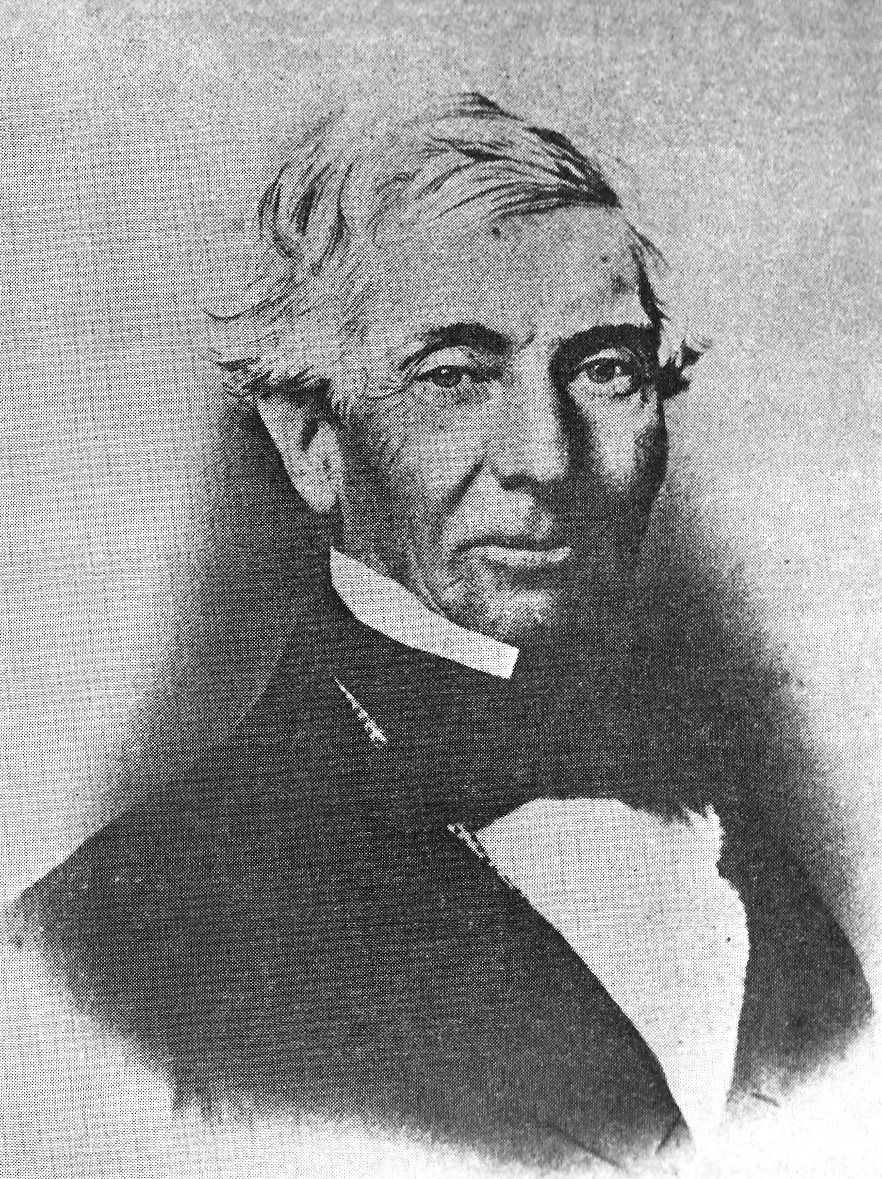
Steuart painted by his granddaughter Maria Louisa Steuart.

On January 25, 1824 Steuart married Maria Louisa Bernabeu (1800–1883). They had nine children, of whom six survived to adulthood:

- Dr James Aloysius Steuart (1828–1903). Steuart became a successful physician in his own right, rising to become Health Commissioner of Baltimore in around 1876.

His daughter, Maria Louisa Steuart (1852–1938) painted her grandfather's portrait.

- John Baptiste de Bernabeu Steuart (1831–1877)
- William Donaldson Steuart (1834–1931)
- Emily Steuart (c1835-1905)
- Richard Sprigg Steuart Jr (1836–1920)
- Isabella Clara Steuart (1841–1921)

== Legacy ==
Steuart's building at Spring Grove (known at various times as "The Main Building", "The Center Building" or "The Administration Building,") remained the main hospital facility for almost 100 years, though it was eventually demolished in 1963, when it was replaced by more modern construction. Spring Grove continues to treat psychiatric illness to this day, and is the second oldest institution of its kind in the United States. However, possibly because of Steuart's enthusiastic support for the Confederate "Lost Cause", no building at Spring Grove Hospital Center bears his name.
