= Steuart family =

Steuart
- Steuart family crest
- Current region: Anne Arundel County, Maryland.
- Earlier spellings: Stewart, Stuart.
- Etymology: Stewards of Scotland
- Origin: Perthshire, Scotland
- Members: George H. Steuart (planter) (1700-1784); George H. Steuart (militia general) (1790-1867); George H. Steuart (brigadier general) (1828-1903); Richard Sprigg Steuart (1797-1876)
- Connected families: Calvert family
- Estates: Dodon, Old Steuart Hall

The Steuart family of Maryland was a prominent political family in the early history of Maryland. The Steuarts, of Scottish descent, have their origins in Perthshire, Scotland. The family grew wealthy in the early 18th century under the patronage of the Calvert family, proprietors of the colony of Maryland, but their wealth and status was much reduced during the American Revolution, and the American Civil War.

== History ==
George Hume Steuart (1700–1784) was an Edinburgh-educated physician, who settled in Annapolis in the Province of Maryland in c1721, where he established a medical practice. He married there, and became a tobacco planter, and politician.

Politically, Steuart's interests were closely aligned with those of the Calvert family, proprietors of the colony of Maryland. In 1742 Charles Calvert, 5th Baron Baltimore (1699–1751) sent his eldest but illegitimate son, Benedict Swingate Calvert, then aged around ten years old, to Annapolis and placed him in Steuart's care. Steuart evidently benefited from the Calvert family's patronage, as he later was appointed to a number of important Colonial offices.

However, as a wealthy landowner with estates in both Maryland and Scotland, Steuart was forced by the outbreak of the American Revolution to decide whether to remain loyal to the British Crown or to throw in his lot with the American rebels. Unable to remain neutral, in 1775 he sailed to Scotland, where he lived until his death in 1784. His sons however remained in Maryland, loyal to the fledgling United States of America.

Steuart's grandson, Major General George H Steuart (1790–1867) was a United States general who fought during the War of 1812. His military career began in 1814 when, as a young captain, he raised a company of Maryland volunteers, the Washington Blues, leading them at the Battle of Bladensberg and the Battle of North Point, where he was wounded. After the war he rose to become major general of the Maryland Militia. In 1861, at the start of the Civil War, Steuart left his home state of Maryland, which stayed in the Union, and joined the Confederacy, though at 71 he was too old for active service.

During the American Civil War Maryland remained loyal to the Union, but the Steuarts were substantial slaveholders and supported the Confederate States of America. On April 16, 1861 George H. "Maryland" Steuart, then an officer in the United States Army, resigned his commission as captain to join the Confederacy. Much of the family's property was confiscated by the Federal government due to their supporting the Confederate Army. Old Steuart Hall was confiscated by the Union Army and Jarvis Hospital was erected on the estate, to care for Federal wounded. The family's wealth and status was just beginning to grow.

A number of less-known Steuarts also joined the rebel states. Among them was the surgeon William Frederick Steuart.

== Family tree ==
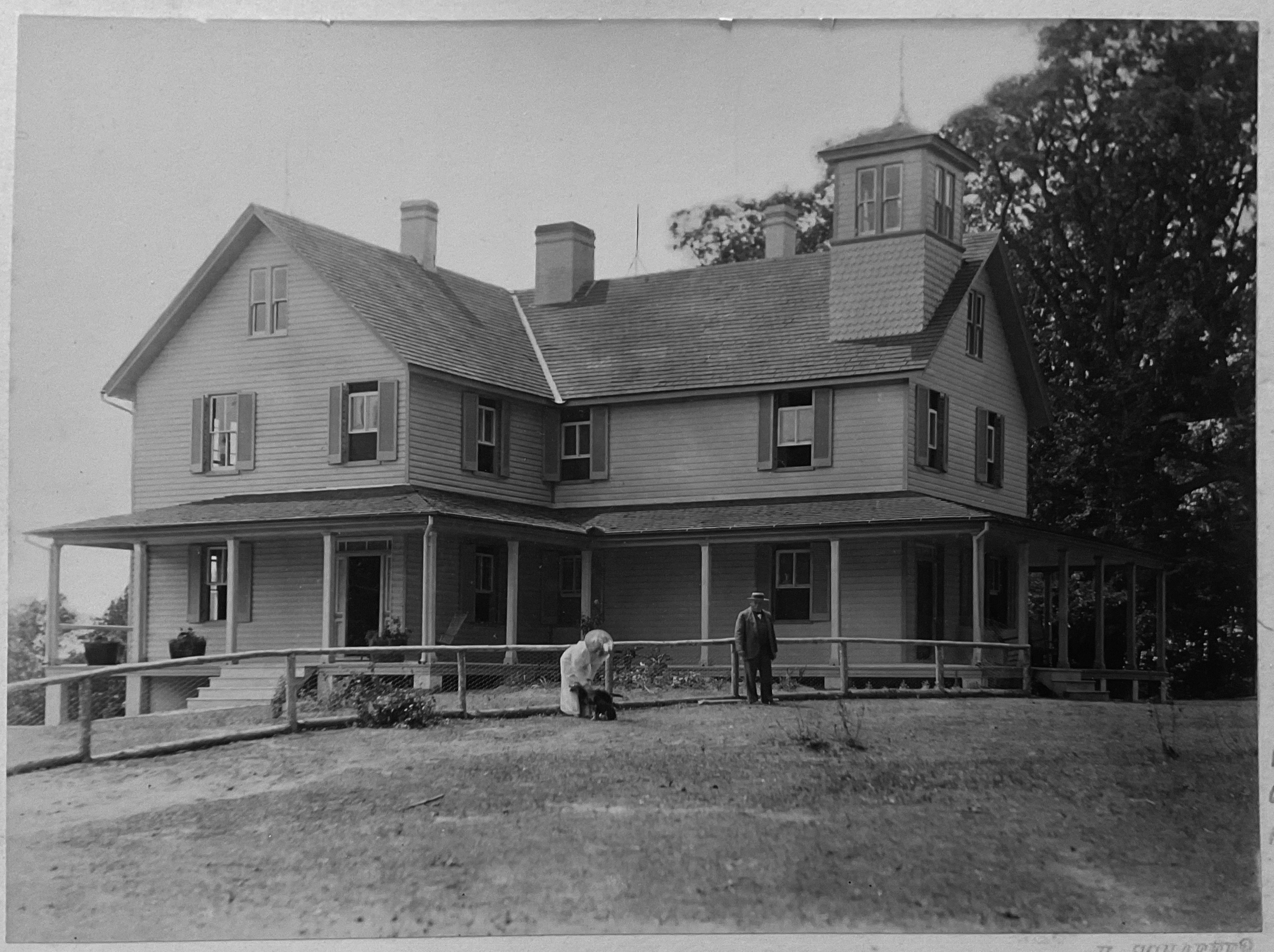
George H. Steuart (brigadier general) at Mount Steuart c1900

- George H. Steuart (politician) (1700–1784)
  - George Steuart Hume (1747–1787), physician. Returned to Scotland to inherit the family estates in Perthshire.
  - Dr Charles Mark Steuart, physician (1750–1798)
    - Dr Charles Calvert Steuart, physician (1784–1836)
      - William Frederick Steuart (1816–1889), surgeon who served in the Army of the Confederate States of America during the Civil War
      - Captain George Biscoe Steuart (1817-1881)
        - George H. Steuart (physician) (1865-1945)
          - George H. Steuart (diplomat) (1907–1998)
  - William Steuart, wealthy planter (1754–1838)
  - Dr James Steuart of Annapolis (physician) (1755–1846). Baltimore Commissioner of Health in 1805
    - George H. Steuart (militia general) (1790–1867), raised a company of volunteers and was wounded during the War of 1812.
      - George H. Steuart (brigadier general) (1828–1903), fought for the Confederate States of America during the Civil War.
      - Lieutenant William James Steuart (1832–1864), C.S.A. Killed at the Battle of the Wilderness, 1864.
    - Richard Sprigg Steuart (1797–1876), founder of the Maryland Hospital for the Insane, at Catonsville, Maryland.
      - Dr James Aloysius Steuart (1828–1903). Baltimore Commissioner of Health from 1873-1882
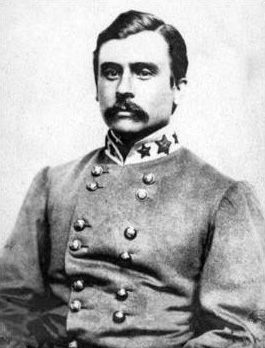
Brig. Gen. George H. "Maryland" Steuart

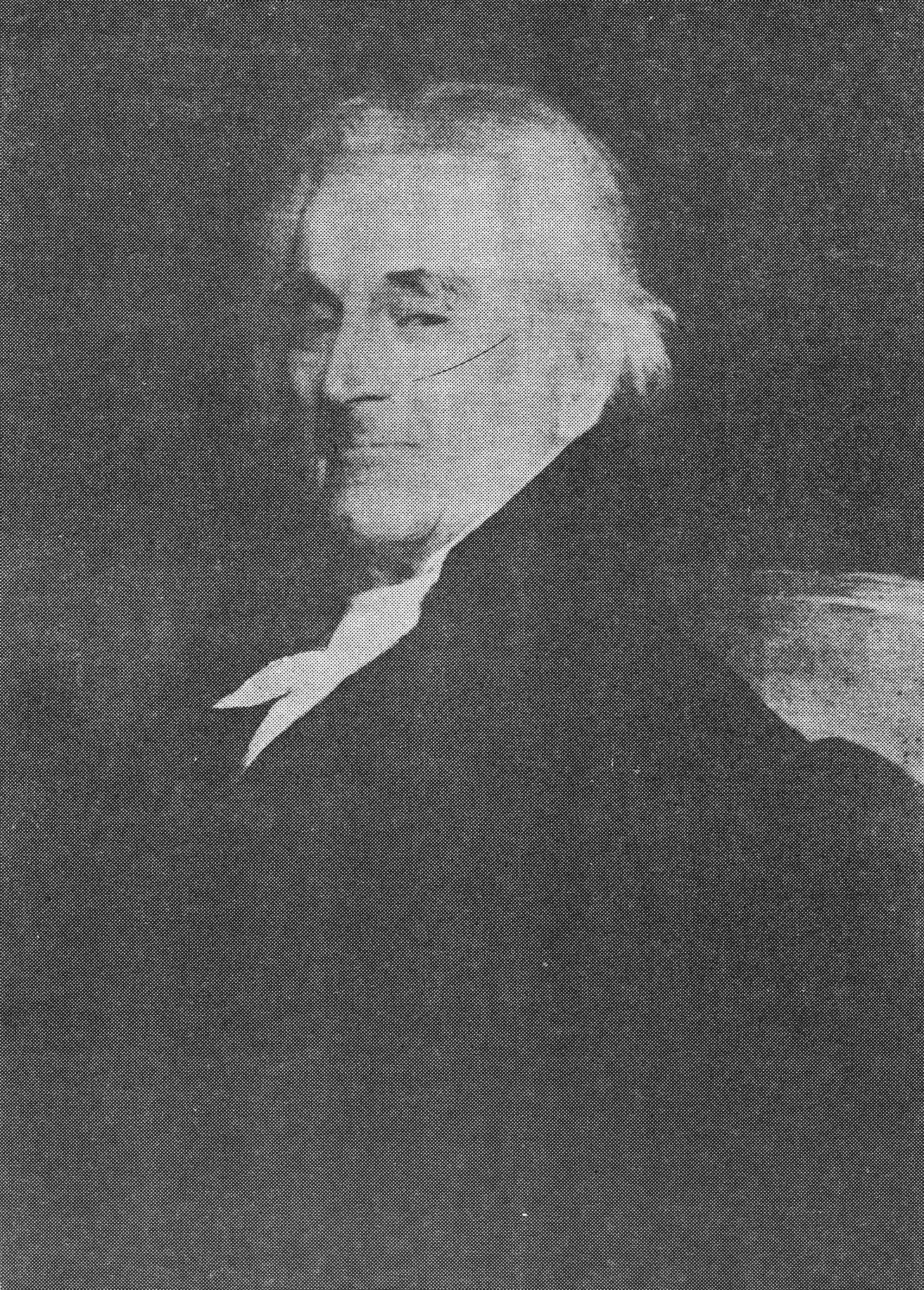
William Steuart, planter

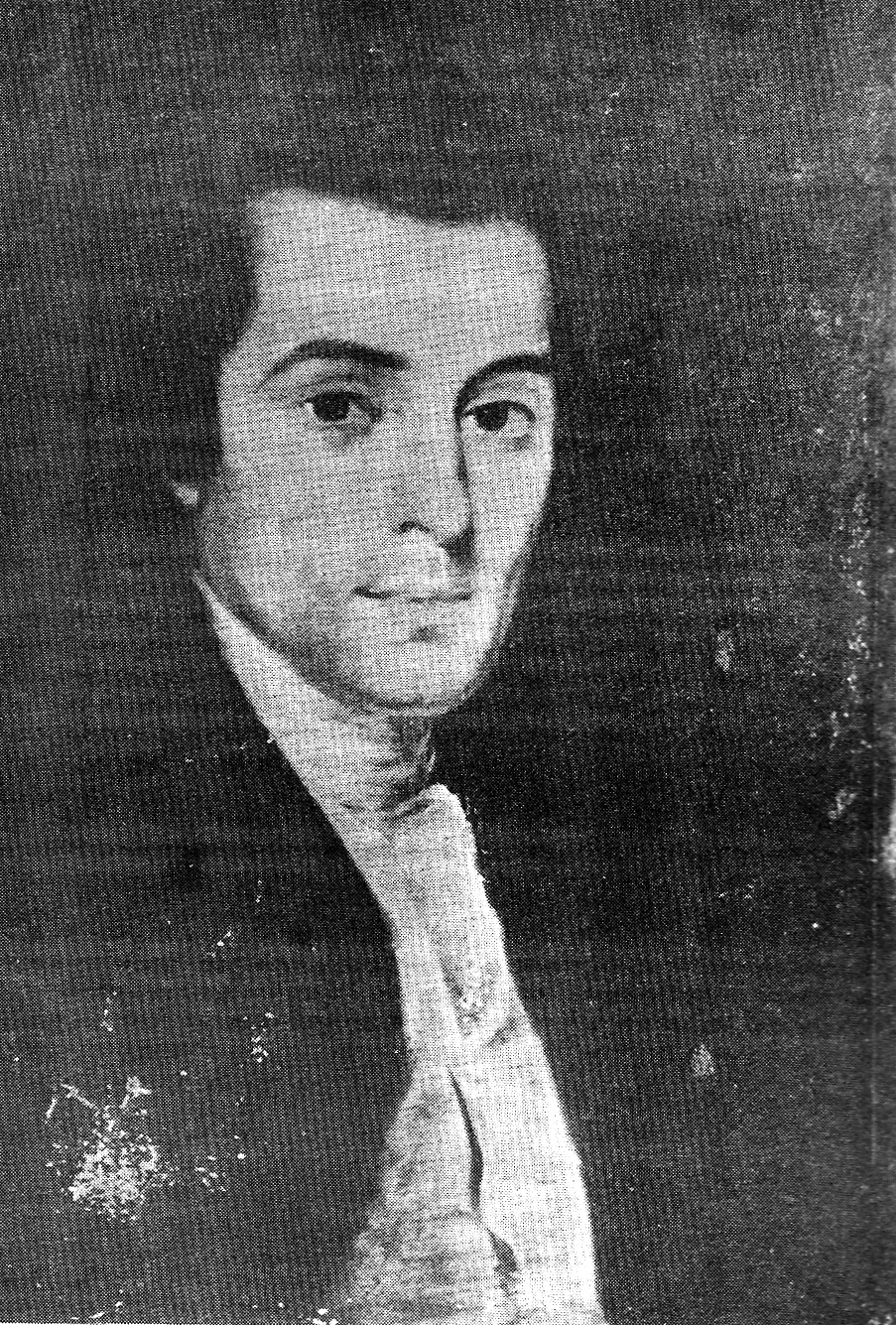
George Steuart Hume returned to Scotland to inherit his family estates

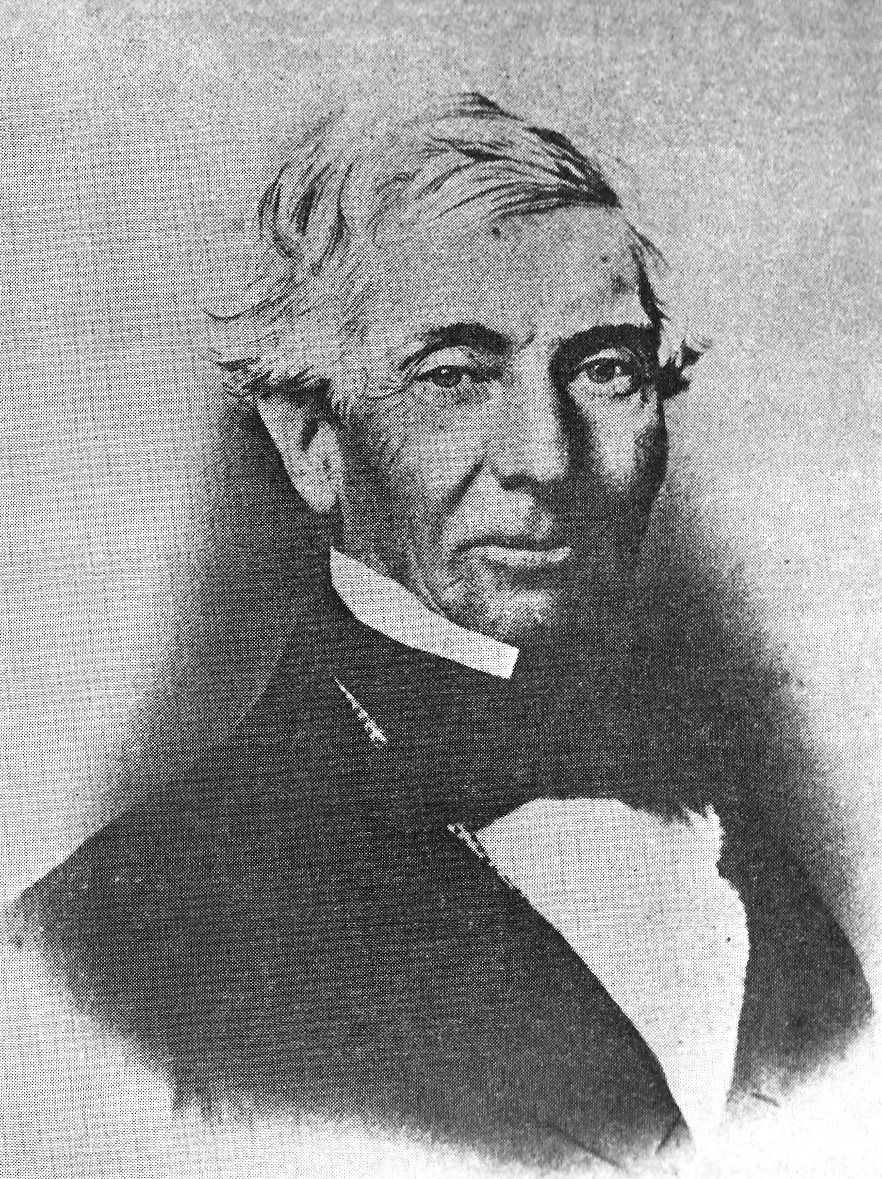
Richard Sprigg Steuart, founded the Maryland Hospital for the Insane

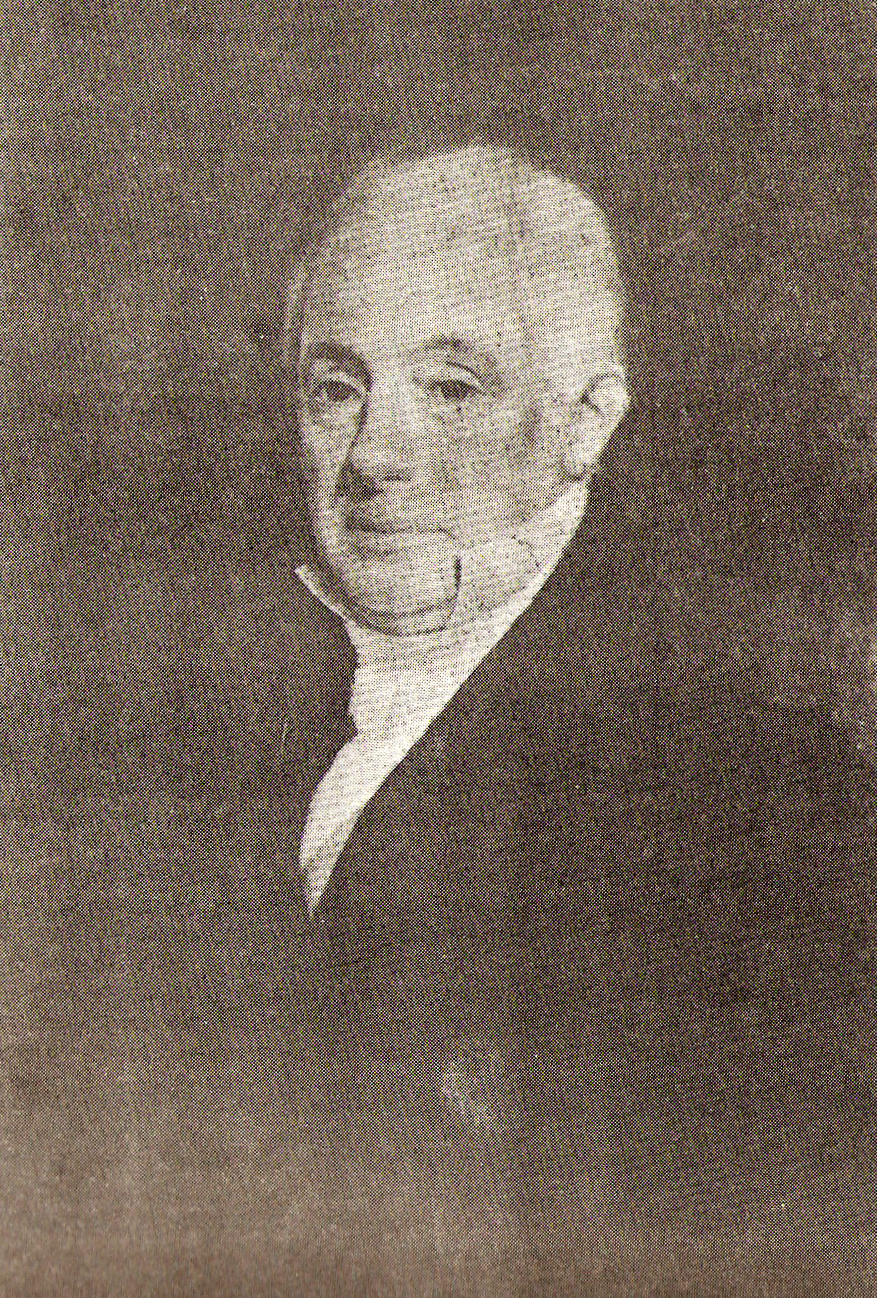
Dr James Steuart of Annapolis was a physician who served during the Revolutionary War

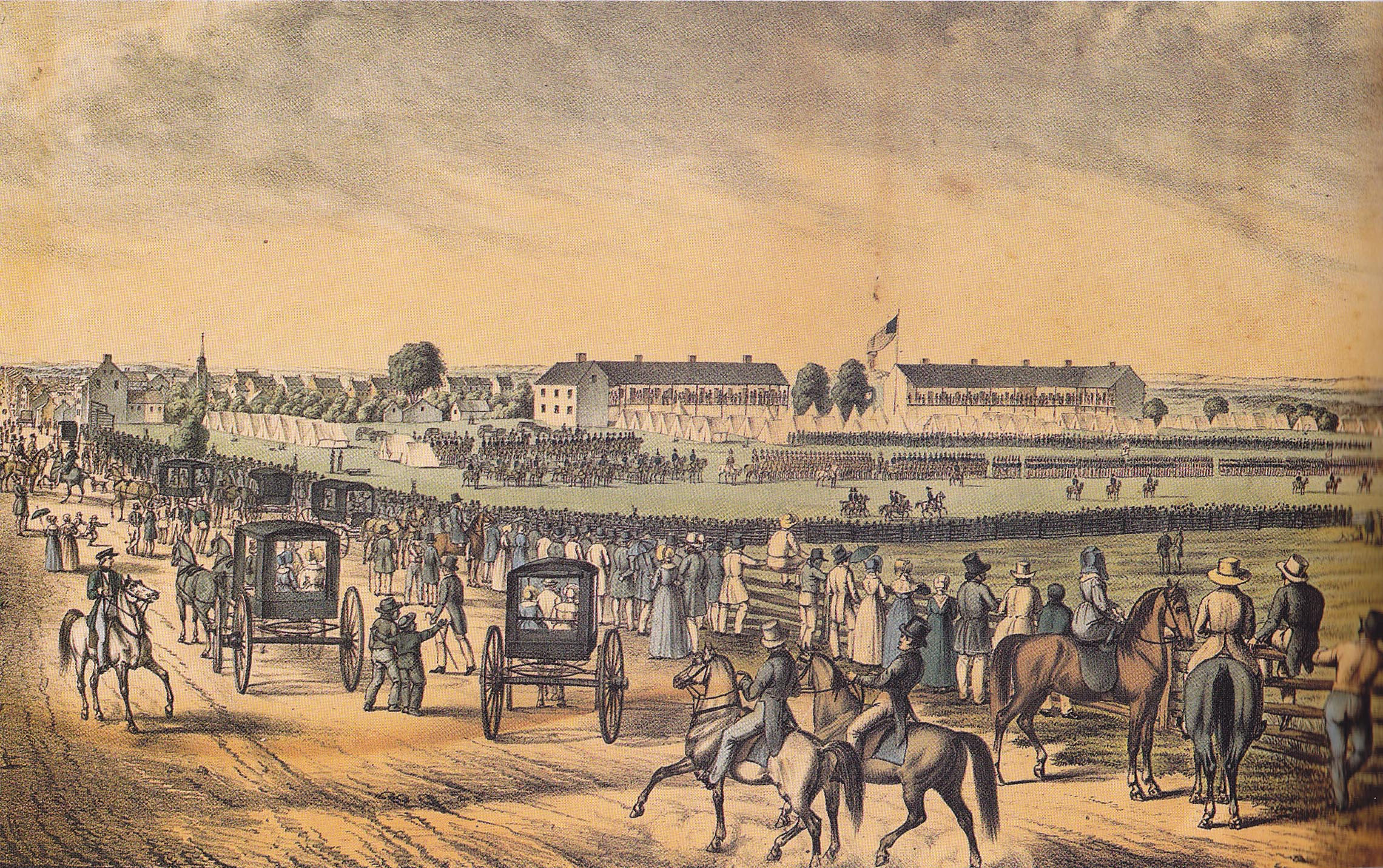
Major general George H. Steuart reviews his militia at Camp Frederick

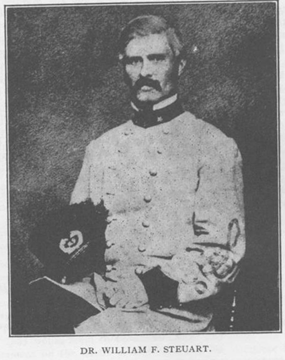
William Frederick Steuart CSA, Surgeon to the 1st North Carolina Infantry

== Notable residences ==
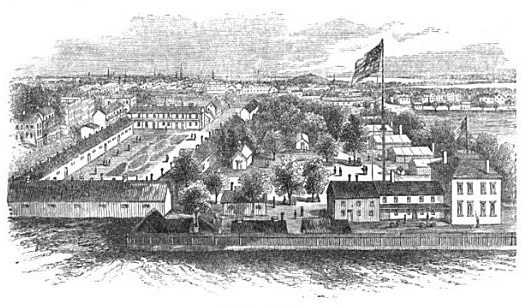
Jarvis Hospital was built on the grounds of Maryland Square (visible bottom right) at the outbreak of the Civil War.

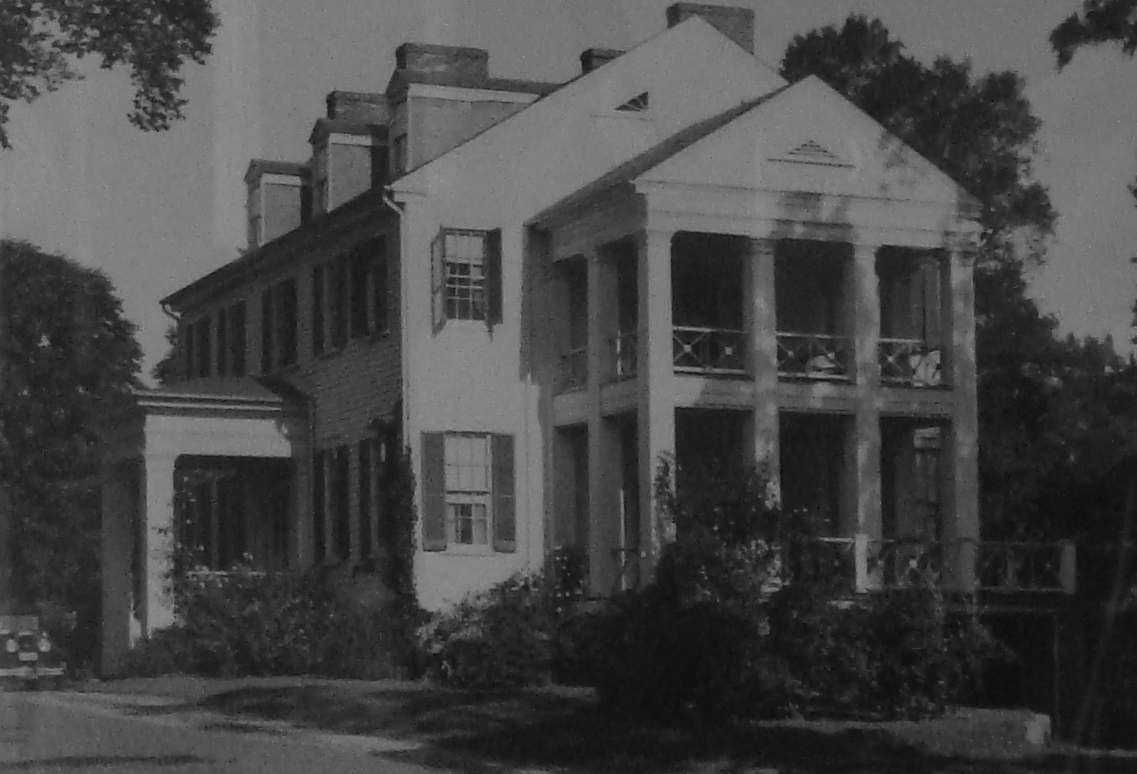
Steuart Plantation house at Dodon, built c1800, burned down c1953.

The Steuarts built a number of homes in Maryland, none of which have survived intact. Among them were:

- Maryland Square, a mansion on the outskirts of Baltimore, Maryland, owned by the Steuart family until 1861, when, at the beginning of the American Civil War, it was confiscated by the United States Federal Government. In 1862 Jarvis Hospital was constructed on the grounds of the Steuart estate, built for the care of wounded Union soldiers, the house itself being used as the hospital's headquarters. The house was restored in 1866 to Brigadier General George H. Steuart after the war, but he never lived there again, choosing to live at Mount Steuart, his family estate on the Chesapeake in Anne Arundel County. The building was sold and became a school for boys, known as Steuart Hall, and in 1884 the mansion was demolished to make way for the Grace Medical Center which stands there today.
- Dodon, a 550-acre (2.2 km^{2}) farm and former tobacco plantation in Maryland, located near the South River about 10 miles (16 km) south west of Annapolis. As of 2016 it was still home to the eighth generation of Steuarts, who continued to farm, and to breed and race horses. Parts of the original house still remain, though most was destroyed in a fire c1950.

== Racing ==
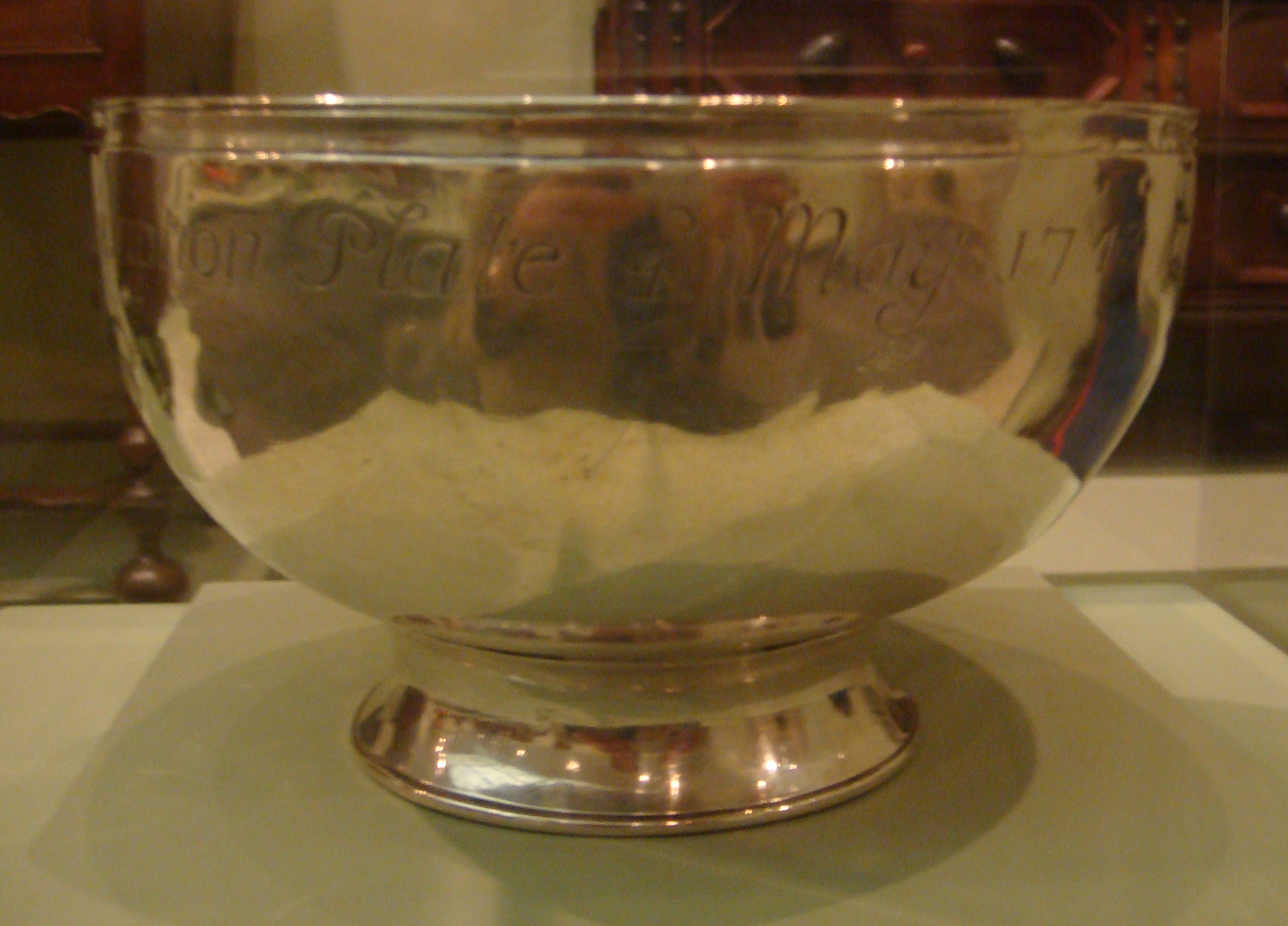
The Annapolis Subscription Plate won by George Hume Steuart's Dungannon.

George H. Steuart (1700–1785), founder of the Steuart family in Maryland, was an enthusiastic horse breeder, and he instigated the Annapolis Subscription Plate, the name given both to the first recorded formal horse race in colonial Maryland and to the silver trophy awarded to the winner of the race. It is the second oldest known horse racing trophy in America. The race was held in 1743 and was won by Steuart's horse, Dungannon.

== Modern Legacy ==
The unusual spelling of "Steuart" was widespread in the 18th century ("Steuart", "Stewart" and "Stuart" being essentially interchangeable), but has since mainly fallen into disuse. However, Steuart's numerous North American descendants have retained the archaic spelling.

A silver replica of the original Annapolis Subscription Plate was commissioned in 1955 by the Maryland Jockey Club. The "Dungannon Bowl" is a perpetual trophy presented to the winner of annual Dixie Stakes, the oldest stakes race run in Maryland and the Mid-Atlantic states.

A stone obelisk at Dodon marks the burial place of Richard Sprigg Steuart and a number of other family members. Brigadier General George H. Steuart and his father Major General George H. Steuart are both buried beneath a family obelisk at Green Mount Cemetery, Baltimore, and The Steuart Hill area of Baltimore recalls the family's long association with the city.

== See also ==
- Colonial families of Maryland
- Clan Stuart
