= William Frederick Steuart =

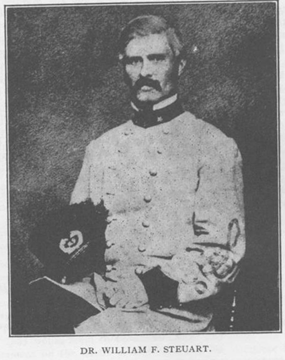
- Portrait of Dr. William Frederick Steuart, CSA
- Born: January 1, 1816; West River, Anne Arundel County, Maryland], U.S.
- Died: December 10, 1889 (aged 73); Christ Church, Owensville, Maryland, U.S.
- Known for: Spring Grove Hospital Center
- Spouse: Anne Hall (m. 1840)
- Relatives: Richard Sprigg Steuart, cousin. George H. Steuart, great-grandfather
- Medical career
- Profession: Physician
- Institutions: Maryland Hospital for the Insane
- Military career
- Allegiance: Confederate States of America
- Branch: Confederate States Army
- Service years: 1856-1865
- Rank: Surgeon

William Frederick Steuart (January 1, 1816 – December 10, 1889) was an American doctor who served in the Confederate States Army during the American Civil War. He was a surgeon in the 3rd North Carolina Infantry Regiment, a unit that formed part of the brigade commanded by his cousin, General George H. Steuart. After the war he returned to Maryland and served as resident physician at the Maryland Hospital for the Insane, an institution founded largely thanks to the efforts of another cousin, Richard Sprigg Steuart.

== Early life ==
Steuart was born on January 1, 1816, in West River, Anne Arundel County, the son of Maryland physician Charles Calvert Steuart and his wife Anne Fitzhugh Biscoe. His grandfather was the Maryland physician Charles Mark Steuart and his great-grandfather was the planter and politician George Hume Steuart. On 27 February 1840 William Steuart married Anne Hall, the daughter of Henry Hall and Mary Stevenson, with whom he had a large family.

== Civil War ==
Like other members of the Steuart family, Steuart was sympathetic to the Southern cause. On the outbreak of war, he found himself obliged to flee his home state of Maryland, which remained in the Union, to join the rebellion. As a Confederate sympathiser he had been closely watched by the authorities in Maryland. One of his sons was arrested and imprisoned, and shot dead while attempting to escape, hardening Steuart's own views against the Union.

Steuart and his wife fled their home state and joined the Confederate cause with around $20,000 in paper and precious metal which they smuggled out of Maryland, rolling up bills of exchange and hiding them in their belongings. They promptly invested their small fortune in Confederate bonds, so certain were they of Southern success in the war.

Steuart served as a surgeon in the 3rd North Carolina Infantry Regiment, a unit that mustered at Garysburg, North Carolina, in May, 1861 and formed part of the brigade commanded by his cousin, General George Hume Steuart. His assistant surgeon was Thomas Fanning Wood, whose detailed account of the regiment's wartime experience would be published in 2000 by the University of Tennessee Press.

Despite being "esteemed by officers and men" in the regiment, it appears that army life was too much for him, as the "rigors of march" and the "hardships of camp" eventually obliged him to apply to be posted away from front line duty. This may have been due to his age; Steuart was around 50 years of age when he joined the Southern armies.

He was replaced by Dr B M Cromwell, formerly of the 1st North Carolina Infantry Regiment, whose first service was at the Battle of Payne's Farm.

== After the war ==
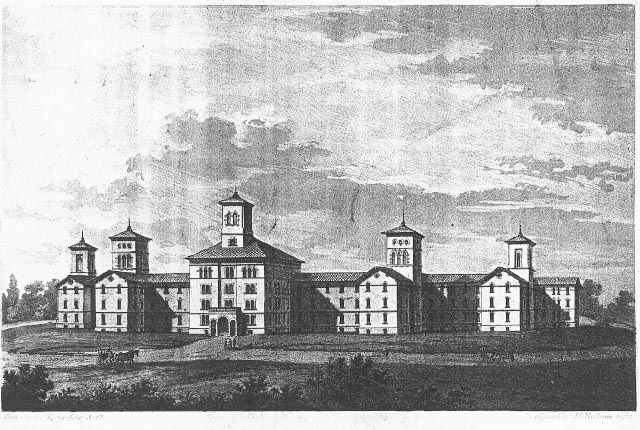
Maryland Hospital for the Insane at Spring Grove.

After the war, Steuart returned to Maryland and private practice, where he became resident physician at the Maryland Hospital for the Insane, a pioneering institution dedicated to the care of mental illness which had been founded largely thanks to the efforts of his cousin, Richard Sprigg Steuart.

William Steuart died on December 10, 1889, and was buried in Christ Church, Owensville, Anne Arundel County, Maryland.

== Family ==
Steuart and his wife Ann had eleven children:

- Henry "Harry" August Steuart (1840-11 May 1862), Captain in the CSA. Blockade runner during the Civil War, captured while running medical supplies to the Confederacy, and killed.
- Charles Steuart, born in 1842 and died in infancy
- William Frederick Steuart (1843–1902), served in the CSA
- Ann Steuart, born in 1845 and died in infancy
- Louis Edward Steuart, born c1846 and served in the CSA.
- Charles Steuart, born in 1847 and died in infancy
- Richard Estep Steuart (1849–1923)
- Mary Stevenson Steuart (1851–1897)
- Eleanor Steuart (1856–1906)
- George Biscoe Steuart (1857–1927)
- Dr Cecil Calvert Steuart (1869–1919)
