= Louis O'Donovan =

American religious historian (1872–1949)

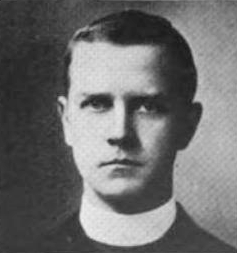
- Born: July 24, 1872; Baltimore, Maryland
- Died: October 9, 1949 (aged 77); Baltimore, Maryland
- Burial place: New Cathedral Cemetery
- Education: Loyola High School, Loyola College, St. Charles College, St. Mary's Seminary, Catholic University
- Occupation(s): Clergyman, historian

Rev. Msgr. Louis O'Donovan, S.T.L. (July 24, 1872 – October 9, 1949) was an American religious historian and parish priest of St. Martin's Church, Baltimore.

== Biography ==
Louis O'Donovan was born in Baltimore on July 24, 1872.

He contributed to the 1913 Catholic Encyclopaedia and translated Henry VIII of England's pro-papal 1521 book, Assertio septem sacramentorum, from Latin into English.

He was educated at Loyola High School, Loyola College, and studied for the priesthood at St. Charles College, St. Mary's Seminary, and the Catholic University.

He died at Bon Secours Hospital in Baltimore on October 9, 1949.
