= Jarvis Hospital =

Coordinates: 39°17′18″N 76°38′57″W

Jarvis U.S. General Hospital
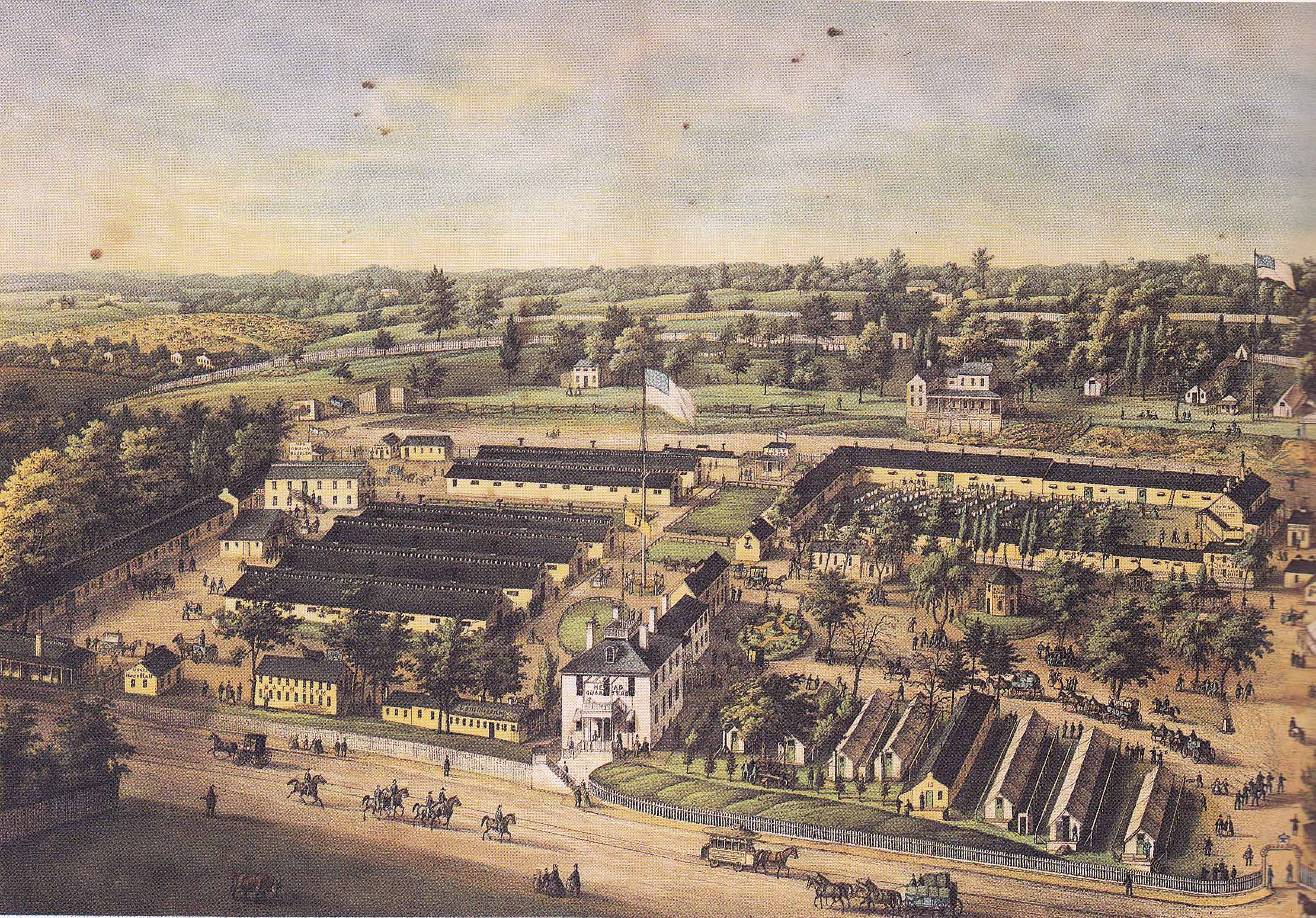
- Jarvis Hospital c. 1862. The former Steuart family mansion of Maryland Square is visible in the center.

Geography
- Location: Grounds of Maryland Square, Baltimore, Maryland, United States

Organization
- Care system: Union Army
- Type: Specialist

Services
- Emergency department: Yes
- Beds: 1500
- Speciality: Care of wounded soldiers during the American Civil War

History
- Founded: 1862
- Closed: 1865

Links
- Lists: Hospitals in Maryland

Jarvis U.S. General Hospital was a military hospital founded in Baltimore, Maryland, in 1861, at the beginning of the American Civil War, for the care of wounded Federal soldiers. The hospital was built on the grounds of Maryland Square, the former residence of the Steuart family, which had been confiscated by the Federal government at the outbreak of war. The hospital closed at the end of the war.

== History ==
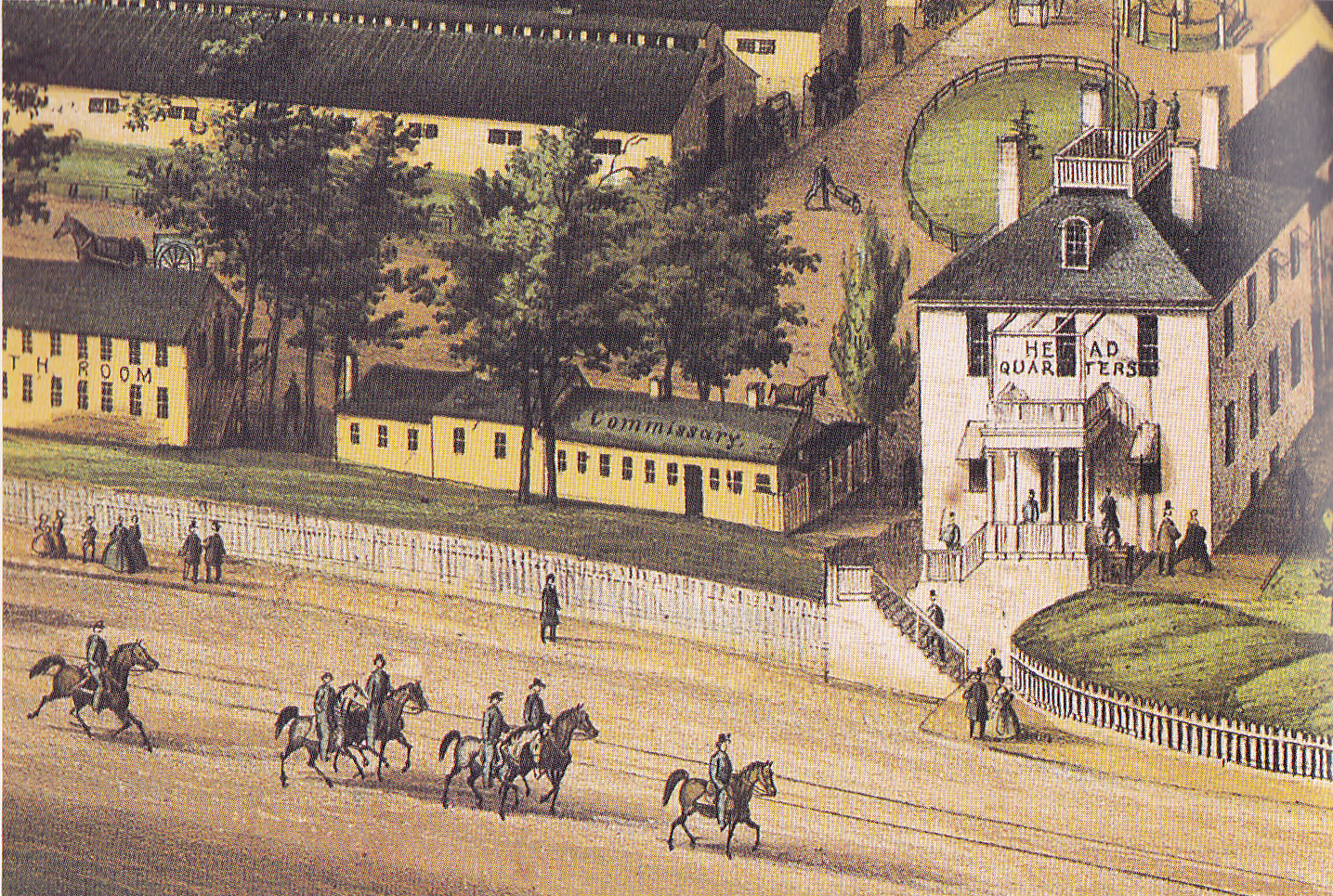
A close up view of Jarvis Hospital HQ, formerly the Steuart mansion known as Maryland Square, c.1861.

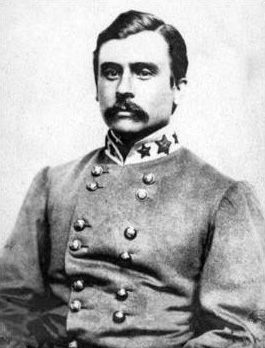
Jarvis Hospital was built on the grounds of Maryland Square, confiscated from Brigadier General George H. Steuart at the outbreak of the Civil War.

Although Maryland was a slave state, she remained in the Union during the Civil War. However, many Marylanders were sympathetic to the Confederacy, including the Steuart family of Baltimore, who were planters and slave owners along the Chesapeake Bay. On April 16, 1861 Brigadier General George H. Steuart (1828–1903), then a captain in the US Army, resigned his commission, left Maryland and joined the Confederacy.

His father, Major General George H. Steuart (1790–1867), did the same, though he was by then considered too old for active service. As a consequence of these actions, the family home at Maryland Square, on the Western outskirts of Baltimore, was confiscated by the US government.

In February 1862 a Massachusetts soldier described the property, by then known as "Camp Andrew", after Massachusetts Governor John Andrew:

"We are nicely quartered on a high hill situated on the west of Baltimore formerly owned by Gen. Stewart [sic] now of the Rebel Army and the property is now confiscated. There are about 36 acres in the field and a house and out buildings and it must have been a very nice place before the troops went in there."

On May 25, 1862 the property was taken into the control of the medical director of the US Army, with the former Steuart mansion serving as the main administration building for the hospital.

The hospital, which had a capacity of 1,500 beds, was built on relatively high ground, which at the time was on the edge of the city of Baltimore, and, according to one contemporary writer, benefited from "a salubrious air". It was named in memory of surgeon N. S. Jarvis, of the US Army, who died while medical director of the Middle Department.

In April 1864, Lt. Col. DeWitt Clinton Peters, Assistant Surgeon in charge at Jarvis Hospital, received a number of prisoners recently released from the Confederate Prisoner of War camp at Belle Isle, Virginia. He described the "great majority" of the patients as being:

"in a semi-state of nudity...laboring under such diseases as chronic diarrhoea, phthisis pulmonalis, scurvy, frost bites, general debility, caused by starvation, neglect and exposure. Many of them had partially lost their reason, forgetting even the date of their capture, and everything connected with their antecedent history. They resemble, in many respect, patients laboring under cretinism. They were filthy in the extreme, covered in vermin...nearly all were extremely emaciated; so much so that they had to be cared for even like infants."

According to Surgeon General Joseph K Barnes, Union hospitals treated over a million patients during the war, with a mortality rate of 8%.

== After the war ==
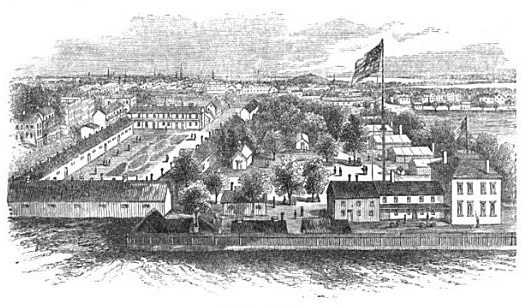
Jarvis Hospital. The former Steuart Mansion of Maryland Square can be seen in the bottom right hand corner.

Jarvis hospital was closed in 1865, at the war's end. In 1866, on May 15 and June 6, the buildings of Jarvis hospital were auctioned off, permitting successful bidders 10 days from the date of auction in which to remove their purchases from the grounds.

General Steuart's house was restored to him after the war, but he never lived there again, choosing to live at Mount Steuart, his family estate on the Chesapeake in Anne Arundel County. When he visited Baltimore, Steuart would stay instead at the Carrollton hotel.

In 1867, the building was re-named Steuart Hall, and leased to the Reverend Newman Hank as a school for "young gentlemen", one of whom later recalled that, though the "long corridors, many closets and corners in unexpected places" made a fine place to explore and play, few dared enter after dark. The boys feared "the groaning of the dying, and when the stairs creaked, we knew why - they were bearing out the dead".

In 1872, what was left of the land was sold off in lots as part of a development known as "Chesapeake Heights". In 1882, the property was acquired by the Sisters of Bon Secours for use as a convent. In 1884, the mansion was demolished.

== Legacy ==
General Steuart died in 1903, and little trace of his mansion, or Jarvis Hospital, remains today. In 1919, the Sisters of Bon Secours opened a hospital, their first in the United States, at 2000 West Baltimore Street, on the site of the former Jarvis Hospital. The Bon Secours Hospital continues to flourish today, and forms an important part of the modern neighbourhood, which retains the name of Steuart Hill.
