= Maryland Square =

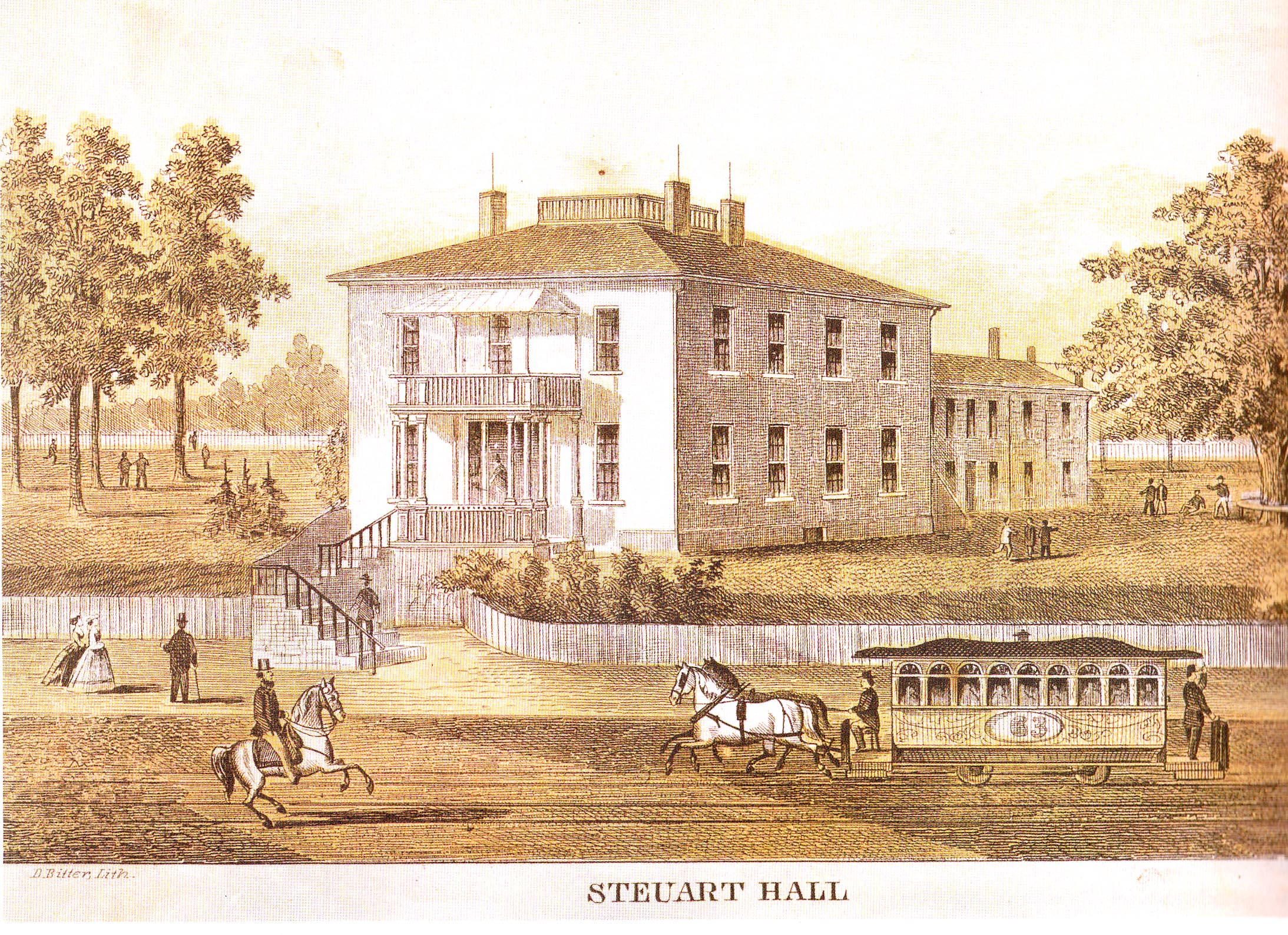
- "Steuart Hall", formerly known as "Maryland Square", Civil War site of Jarvis Military Hospital, c. 1868.
- Interactive map of the Maryland Square area
- Alternative names: Steuart Hall

General information
- Type: Mansion
- Architectural style: Georgian
- Location: Corner of Monroe and West Baltimore Streets, Baltimore, Maryland, United States
- Coordinates: 39°17′18″N 76°38′57″W
- Construction started: late Eighteenth Century
- Completed: late Eighteenth Century
- Demolished: 1885

Technical details
- Structural system: Timber frame

"Maryland Square", later known as "Steuart Hall", was a mansion owned by the Steuart family from 1795 to 1861, located on the western outskirts of Baltimore, Maryland, at the present-day junction of West Baltimore and Monroe streets. In the first year of the American Civil War, the property was confiscated by the United States Federal Government as its owner, George H. Steuart, a former United States Army officer, had resigned his commission to fight in the Confederate Army, in the Army of Northern Virginia as a brigadier general.

In 1862, the U.S. War Department built various temporary wooden barracks-style buildings for the Jarvis Military Hospital on the grounds, to care for wounded Union soldiers. The "West Military Hospital" was located on the docks at East Pratt Street, near President Street, at "The Basin" harbor. The Steuart mansion served as the Hospital's headquarters/offices.

After the war, in 1866 General Steuart regained possession of his mansion, but did not live there again. He chose to live at "Mount Steuart", his large family plantation further to the southeast of the city of Annapolis on the South River in Anne Arundel County. The next year Steuart leased Maryland Square for use as a school for upper-class boys; it was renamed Steuart Hall. In the 1870s, it was bought by the Roman Catholic order of the Bon Secours Sisters and used as their convent. The mansion was demolished around 1884 for other development. The modern Grace Medical Center, was constructed on the site in 1919 by the religious order and is operating today.

== History ==
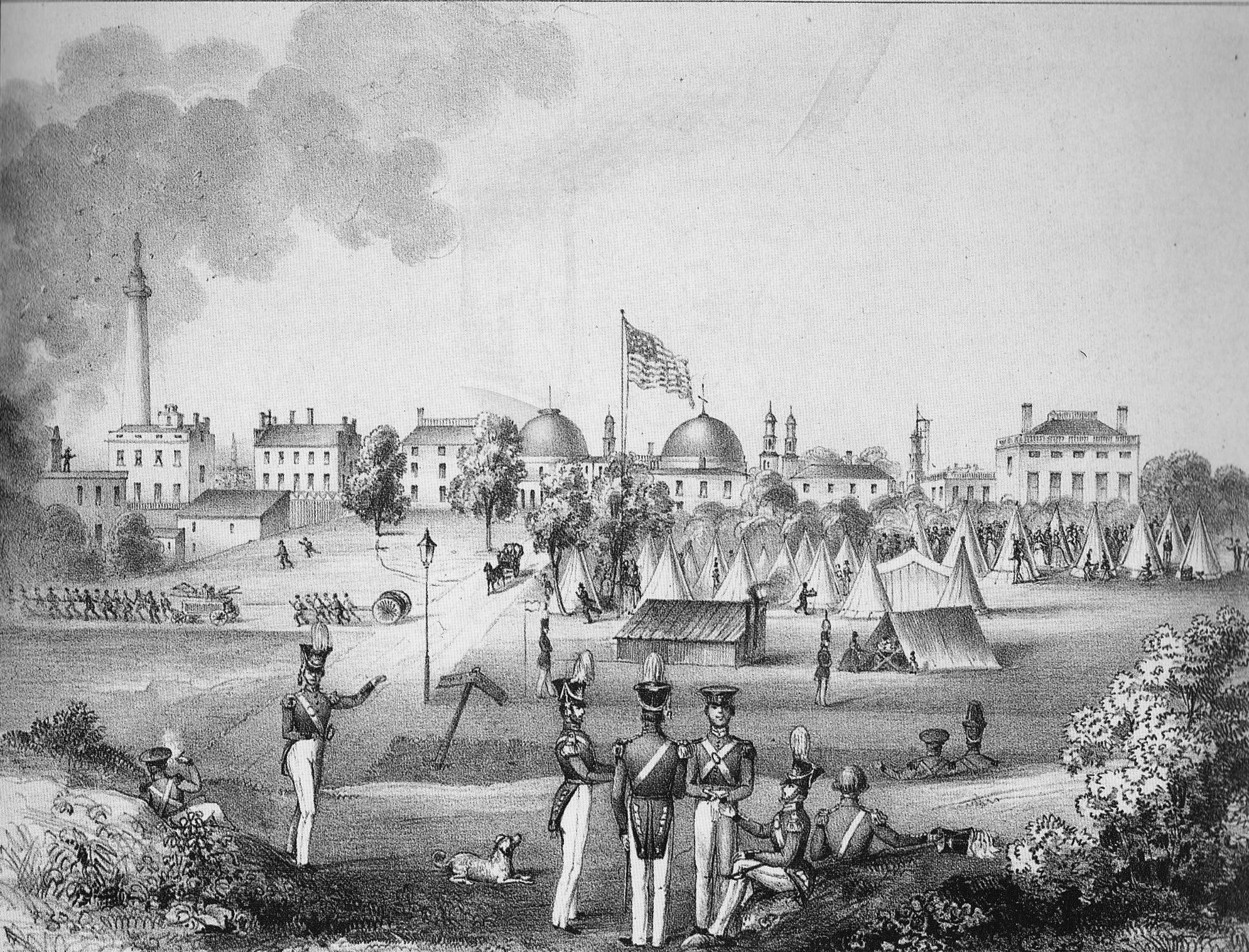
The "Boston Greys" of the Massachusetts state militia encamped in Baltimore, July 1844. "Maryland Square" can be seen on the right hand side.

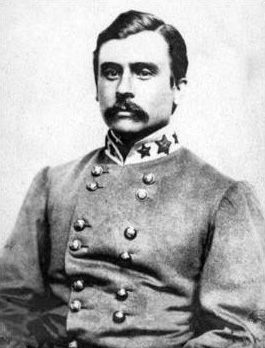
Brigadier General George H. Steuart was raised at "Maryland Square".

"Maryland Square" was the Baltimore residence of the Steuart family from around 1795, when purchased by physician James Steuart of Annapolis, son of the politician and planter George H. Steuart. The Steuart family moved to Baltimore from Annapolis in 1795, as Baltimore began to eclipse Annapolis in size and importance. The mansion was located at the present-day junction of West Baltimore and Monroe streets and built on relatively high ground, at the time on the western outskirts of the city. A contemporary writer said it benefited from "a salubrious air".

Among the members of the family who were raised there was the physician and philanthropist Richard Sprigg Steuart, who described the "large and solitary" mansion in his memoirs as having "the reputation of being haunted ... [with] departed spirits coming back to visit their old haunts".

On May 8, 1829, James Steuart's daughter Elizabeth was married to the writer and essayist George Henry Calvert, at Maryland Square. Calvert's father had been opposed to the match on the grounds that Elizabeth had little or no property. The son prevailed in his choice.

On July 19, 1844, the Boston City Greys of the Massachusetts state militia visited Baltimore, and marched in parade with various companies of the 53rd Regiment. George H. Steuart, then a militia general, hosted a party at Maryland Square for the visiting militia. The event was celebrated by extensive coverage in the Baltimore American (newspaper - later the Baltimore News-American, 1773–1986), and was commemorated in a lithograph. In 1846, Steuart inherited the house on the death of his father James Steuart.

From 1841 to 1861, Steuart was Commander of the First Light Division, Maryland Volunteer Militia, a predecessor unit of state militia. After the Civil War, the Maryland National Guard was organized as a type of successor to such local militias. Until the Civil War, he would be the Commander-in-Chief of the Maryland Volunteers. The First Light Division comprised two brigades: the 1st Light Brigade and the 2nd Brigade. The First Brigade consisted of the 1st Cavalry, 1st Artillery, and 5th Infantry regiments. The 2nd Brigade was composed of the 1st Rifle Regiment and the 53rd Infantry Regiment, and the "Battalion of Baltimore City Guards".

== Civil War ==
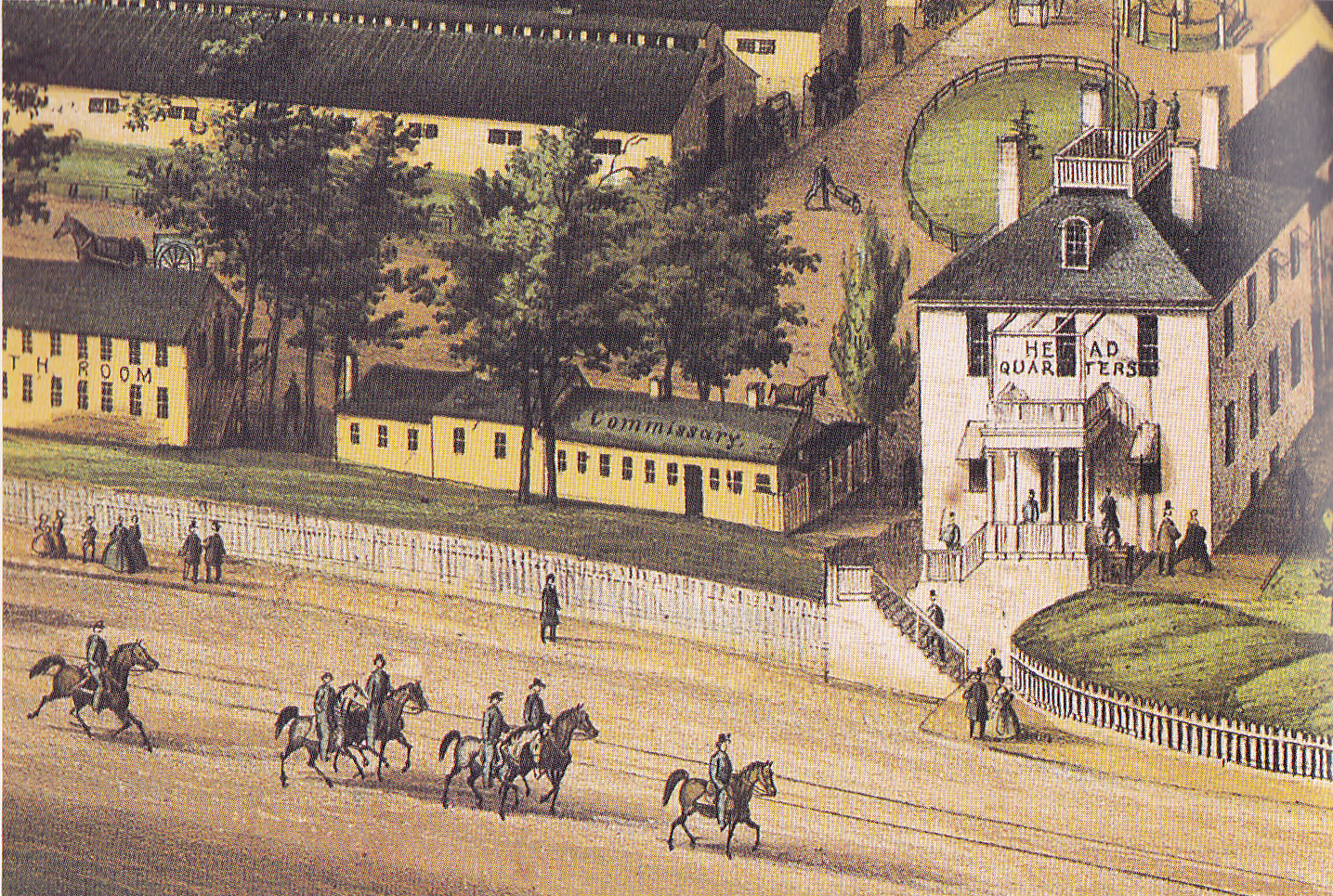
Close-up view of Jarvis Hospital HQ, formerly the Steuart mansion known as "Maryland Square", c.1861.

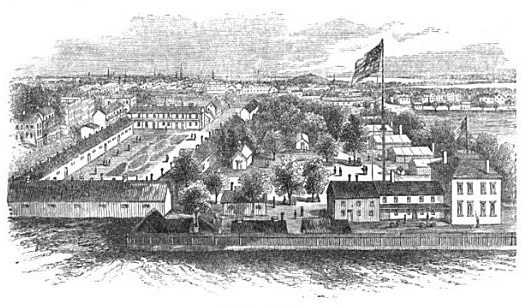
Jarvis Hospital was built on the grounds of Maryland Square (visible bottom right) at the outbreak of the Civil War.

Although Maryland was a slave state, it remained loyal to the Union during the civil war. Many slaveholding planters were sympathetic to the Confederacy, including the Steuart family, who held more than 150 slaves. On April 16, 1861 George H. Steuart (1828–1903), then a captain in the U.S. Army, resigned his commission and joined the Confederacy and the Army of Northern Virginia. His father, George H. Steuart (1790–1867), also joined the Confederate Army, though he was by then considered too old for active service.

As a result, Maryland Square was seized by the U.S. government. On May 25, 1862, the property came under the control of the medical director of the U.S. Army. The former Steuart mansion served as the primary administration building for the Jarvis Hospital. The grounds were used for temporary, numerous wooden barracks-type buildings constructed for the care of wounded Union soldiers.

In February 1862, a Massachusetts soldier described the property (by then known as "Camp Andrew", after Massachusetts Governor John Andrew):

We are nicely quartered on a high hill situated on the west of Baltimore formerly owned by Gen. Stewart [sic] now of the Rebel Army and the property is now confiscated. There are about 36 acres in the field and a house and out buildings and it must have been a very nice place before the troops went in there.

== After the war ==
Jarvis Hospital was closed in 1865 at the war's end. In 1866, on May 15 and June 6, the wooden buildings of the Jarvis Hospital were auctioned off, permitting successful bidders 10 days from the date of auction in which to remove their purchases from the grounds.

General Steuart regained possession of Maryland Square in 1866, but he never lived there again. He lived at "Mount Steuart", the large family plantation on the Chesapeake Bay in Anne Arundel County. When he visited Baltimore, Steuart would stay at the Carrollton Hotel. (This was built in the 1870s on the previous site of the famous colonial/Federal-era "Fountain Inn", at the northeast corner of Light/St. Paul Street and between German [later Redwood] and East Baltimore streets. The Carrollton was replaced by the Southern Hotel, built in 1917).

In 1867, Steuart leased the mansion to the Reverend Newman Hank for use as a school for "young gentlemen". One student later recalled that, though the

long corridors, many closets and corners in unexpected places" made a fine place to explore and play, few dared enter after dark. The boys feared "the groaning of the dying, and when the stairs creaked, we knew why - they were bearing out the dead.

At around this time, the building was named Steuart Hall.

In the early 1870s, the mansion was purchased by the Sisters of Bon Secours for use as a Catholic convent. In 1872 they sold the remaining property in lots as part of a residential development known as "Chesapeake Heights." In 1884 the mansion was demolished.

== Legacy ==
General Steuart died in 1903. Little trace of the original mansion or of the Civil War-era Jarvis Hospital remain.

In 1919, the Sisters of Bon Secours constructed and opened a hospital on the site, their first in the United States, at 2000 West Baltimore Street. The Grace Medical Center continues today as a part of the modern neighborhood in old West Baltimore, which retains the name of "Steuart Hill".

== See also ==
- George H. Steuart (brigadier general)
- Jarvis Hospital
- Steuart family
- Union Square, Baltimore
- History of Baltimore
- Timeline of Baltimore history
- American Civil War
- Maryland in the Civil War
