= Grace Medical Center (Baltimore) =

- LifeBridge Health

Geography
- Location: 2000 West Baltimore Street, Baltimore, Maryland, United States
- Coordinates: 39°17′19″N 76°38′58″W

Organization
- Care system: Private, non-profit
- Network: LifeBridge Health

Services
- Emergency department: Yes
- Beds: 69

History
- Founded: 1919

Links
- Website: Official website
- Lists: Hospitals in Maryland

Grace Medical Center, formerly known as Bon Secours Hospital, is a hospital in Baltimore. The hospital is part of LifeBridge Health, a nonprofit healthcare corporation that was formed in 1998 and currently operates several medical institutions in and around Baltimore, Maryland.

== History ==
The Sisters of Bon Secours are a Roman Catholic religious congregation with the mission of caring for the sick and dying. The name Bon Secours is French for "good help." Members of the group came to Baltimore from Paris in the 1870s, and they bought the former Maryland Square, a mansion built in 1795 and owned by the Steuart family, which was confiscated for use as a military hospital during the Civil War, operating as Jarvis Hospital.

The Sisters used the mansion and its grounds as a convent, selling some of the land for development. The Sisters provided health care to the community. The original mansion was demolished in 1884.

In 1919, George Jenkins, a philanthropist, provided funds to open a Roman Catholic hospital, which was built on the grounds of Maryland Square. The hospital was known as Bon Secours.

In 1996, the hospital merged with Liberty Medical Center, which closed in 1999.

In 2009, the 125-bed Bon Secours hospital considered closing its inpatient services to cut costs. It faced a number of challenges: 17 percent of its patients are uninsured, twice the average in the city. 90 percent of patient visits were made via the emergency department. Its catchment in West Baltimore has high poverty and unemployment rates, meaning that many people cannot pay for care. The hospital was considering emphasizing preventive and maintenance care through outpatient clinics, to reduce long-term disease.

In 2017, Bon Secours received the lowest possible Medicare patient summary rating of one star. Bon Secours declined to provide data to The Leapfrog Group, an independent hospital review agency. However, the Baltimore Sun reported that Leapfrog was able to obtain data about Bon Secours from the state of Maryland, which resulted in a rating of "F", the lowest possible rating and a distinction shared by only 15 hospitals in the US.

In 2018, the hospital's parent company, Bon Secours Health System, merged with Mercy Health of Ohio, creating a combined not-for-profit Catholic health system (Bon Secours Mercy Health) that included 43 hospitals in seven states. The two systems retained their pre-merger names and branding.

Less than six months after the merger with Mercy, LifeBridge Health announced plans to acquire Baltimore's Bon Secours Hospital. LifeBridge is a non-profit health system that operates several medical institutions in and around Baltimore. LifeBridge took over the hospital's operations on November 1, 2019. On December 17, 2019, the hospital changed its name to Grace Medical Center, ending one hundred years of association with the Sisters of Bon Secours. The Sisters of Bon Secours continued to provide social services in Baltimore through Bon Secours Community Works, a separate organization that was spun off from the hospital several years before the sale.

== See also ==
- Jarvis Hospital, the Civil War hospital located on the grounds of Maryland Square, the current site of Bon Secours
