= Elijah Stansbury Jr. =

American politician (1791–1883)

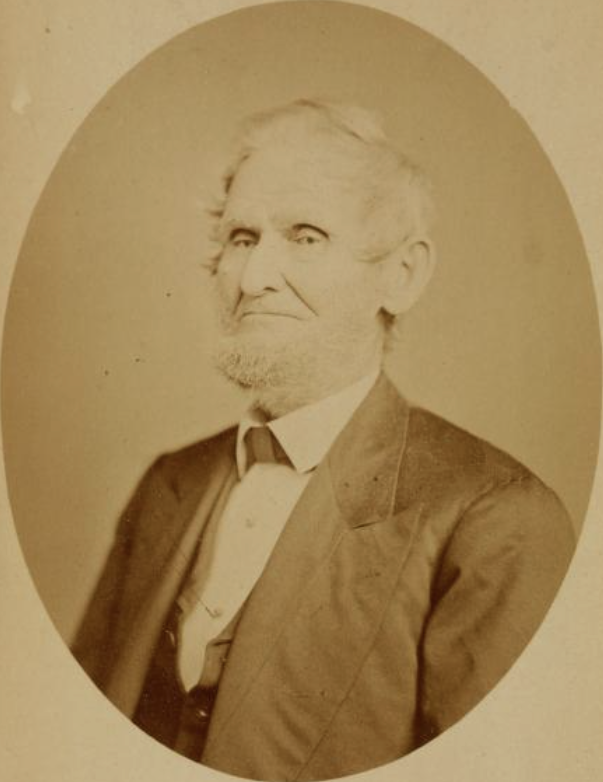

15th Mayor of Baltimore
- In office 1848–1850
- Preceded by: Jacob G. Davies
- Succeeded by: John H. T. Jerome

Member of the Maryland House of Delegates
- In office 1843–1845

Personal details
- Born: May 1791 Baltimore County, Maryland, U.S.
- Died: December 19, 1883 (aged 92)
- Resting place: Baltimore Cemetery
- Party: Democratic
- Spouse: Eliza Eckel (m. 1817)
- Occupation: Politician; soldier; businessman
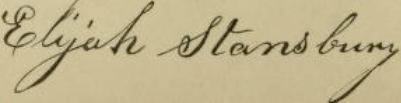
- Signature
- Military career
- Conflicts: War of 1812; Battle of North Point

Elijah Stansbury Jr. (May 1791 – December 19, 1883) was an American politician and soldier. He served in the War of 1812. He served in the Maryland House of Delegates from 1843 to 1845 and as Mayor of Baltimore from 1848 to 1850.

== Early life ==
Elijah Stansbury Jr. was born in May 1791, in the manor of "McGaw's Mills", Baltimore County, Maryland to Elijah Stansbury Sr. He learned the trade of bricklayer. At the age of fifteen, Stansbury organized a company of forty-seven boys. He was elected as captain and Edward Rutledge was first lieutenant.

== Career ==
Stansbury was considered not fit for military service, but volunteered in 1812. He enlisted as a private in the Baltimore Union Artillery under Captain John Montgomery. He took part in the Battle of North Point in September 1814. He was commissioned lieutenant and steadily rose to command a regiment.

After the war Stansbury continued the bricklayer business. Shortly after 1817, Stansbury entered the building supply business. He joined with G. Myers and Dr. Thomson to form a firm to sell botanical medicine called Thomsonian Medicine. He continued this business until 1862.

Stansbury was a Democrat. On October 24, 1824, Stansbury was elected to the First Branch of the Baltimore City Council, representing the Fourth Ward, and served multiple terms from 1825 to 1832. He was elected to the Maryland House of Delegates on October 4, 1843; serving from 1843 to 1845. Stansbury served as Mayor of Baltimore from 1848 to 1850.

== Personal life ==
Stansbury married Eliza Eckel, daughter of Philip P. Eckel, of Baltimore in 1817.

Stansbury died on December 19, 1883. He was buried at Baltimore Cemetery.

Political offices
Preceded by Jacob G. Davies	Mayor of Baltimore; 1848–1850	Succeeded by John H. T. Jerome
