= George Proctor Kane =

American politician (1817–1878)

George P. Kane
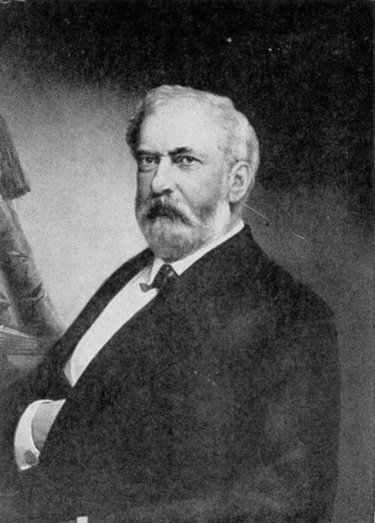

27th Mayor of Baltimore
- In office November 5, 1877 – June 23, 1878
- Preceded by: Ferdinand C. Latrobe
- Succeeded by: Ferdinand C. Latrobe

Personal details
- Born: August 4, 1817 Baltimore, Maryland
- Died: June 23, 1878 (aged 60) Baltimore, Maryland
- Resting place: New Cathedral Cemetery; Baltimore, Maryland, U.S.
- Party: Whig (1841–1854); Democratic (1854–1878)
- Spouse: Anna Griffith
- Profession: U.S. Marshal

George Proctor Kane (August 4, 1817 – June 23, 1878) was an American politician and policeman. He is best known for his role as Marshal of Police during the Baltimore riot of 1861 and his subsequent imprisonment at Fort McHenry and Fort Warren without the benefit of habeas corpus. His position as Marshal of Police and his southern sympathies were two of many factors in Abraham Lincoln's decision in February 1861 to pass through Baltimore surreptitiously on his way to Washington to be inaugurated, in order to avoid a possible assassination attempt. Despite his politics, Kane was instrumental in providing protection and an escort for Mary Todd Lincoln on her arrival in Baltimore in February 1861 on her way to the inauguration of her husband, who had preceded her.

== Biography ==
=== Early life ===
Kane was born in Baltimore in 1817, into an Irish immigrant family, and at an early age entered the grain and grocery business. He was commissioned an ensign in the Independent Grays, a military organization, and afterward commanded the Eagle Artillery and the Montgomery Guards. He was later colonel of the First Maryland Regiment of Artillery.

Mrs. Kane was Miss Anna Griffith, daughter of Capt. John Griffith, of Dorchester County, Maryland.

Kane was originally an adherent of the Whig Party and an active and enthusiastic supporter of Henry Clay, as shown by the fact that he was Grand Marshal of the parade of the Whig Young Men's National Convention held at Baltimore May 1, 1844, which ratified the nomination of Mr. Clay for the Presidency of the United States. In 1847, during the famine in Ireland, he was active in relief work as president of the Hibernian Society. With several others, Mr. Kane purchased the old H-shaped, domed "Merchants' Exchange" (designed by Benjamin Henry Latrobe, built 1816–1820, the largest building in America at the time, also known as the "Baltimore Exchange", later site of the present US Customs House, built 1903–05) on South Gay Street between Water and East Lombard Streets and sold the property to the United States Government itself, which, upon remodeling the buildings, which had always housed Federal courts, customs, post office and a branch of the First Bank of the United States along with other city hall/municipal offices in one wing (until "Old City Hall"—the previous Peale Museum on Holliday Street was acquired in 1830 and occupied to 1875) and also included those of lawyers, brokers, shipping companies and other maritime businesses in another wing. They now continued to use them for years exclusively as the US Customs House and Post-office (until a new US Courthouse was constructed at the northwestern corner of East Fayette Street and North Street (now Guilford Avenue) in 1859–60, dedicated by 15th President, James Buchanan. Later supplemented by a larger central Post Office/US Courthouse of Italian Renaissance Revival architecture with eight small towers and large central clock tower) was constructed in 1889 on the east side of Battle Monument Square, facing North Calvert Street. He was also active in the old volunteer "Baltimore City Unified Fire Department" "confederation" system (organized in the 1830s to 1859) and president of the Old Independent Volunteer Fire Company. Historians credit Colonel Kane with suggesting and campaigning for a "paid", professional steam-powered fire department system which was later finally organized in the city in 1858–1859, as a definite expansion of municipal governmental functions with advanced improvements.

=== Involvement in politics ===
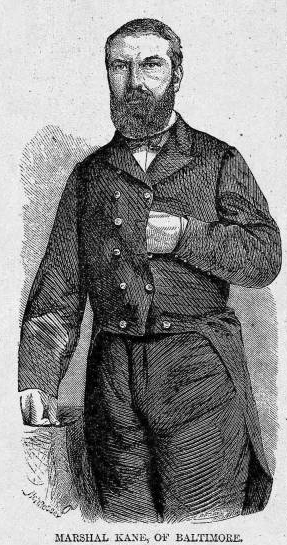
The image of Marshall Kane in Harper's Weekly, July 13, 1861, p. 445, c.1., reprinted in Harper's Pictorial History of the Civil War (1866 as Harper's Pictorial History of the Great Rebellion; 1894; reprint 1977), p. 88.

In 1849 he was appointed Collector of the Port of Baltimore.

In the 1850s, Baltimore was a city mired in political corruption and mob violence with occasional riots between rival gangs known as "Plug-Uglies" and others. The new Baltimore City Police Department had just been organized a few years before in 1857 along with the Baltimore City Fire Department also just the year before in 1859 to eliminate some of the violent clashes between competing rival volunteer fire companies which had served since the 1770s. As a result, the Maryland General Assembly embarked upon a reform movement, which included finding a strong new "Marshal of Police" (chief). Kane filled the bill, becoming Marshal of Police in 1860, under newly elected reformist Mayor George William Brown. According to famous city historian J. Thomas Scharf, "It is impossible to overrate the change that the organization of an efficient police force wrought in the condition of the city." Mayor Brown later wrote that the entire police force "had been raised to a high degree of discipline and efficiency under the command of Marshal Kane."

=== The Baltimore Plot ===
In February 1861, Detective Allan Pinkerton, (1819–1884), working on behalf of the Philadelphia, Wilmington and Baltimore Railroad, uncovered what he believed to be a plot to assassinate President-elect Abraham Lincoln as he journeyed through Baltimore on his way to Washington to begin his first term. Pinkerton presented his findings to Lincoln, which included his belief that Kane, recently appointed Marshal of Police in Baltimore by newly elected reformist Mayor George William Brown, was a "rabid rebel" who could not be trusted to provide security to Mr. Lincoln while in Baltimore. Pinkerton believed that Kane could participate in the plot merely by under-performing in his duties, thereby giving others ample opportunity to carry out their plans, and claimed to have overheard a conversation in a Baltimore hotel in which Kane indicated that he had no intention of providing a police escort for Lincoln. Baltimore at this time was a hotbed of pro-Southern sympathies. Unlike other cities on the President-elect's itinerary, including New York, Philadelphia and Harrisburg, Baltimore had planned no official welcome for Lincoln. Pinkerton's information regarding Kane, along with other information discovered by him, his operatives and others, led to the President-elect's decision to follow the detective's advice, changing his travel plans and passing through Baltimore surreptitiously nine hours ahead of his published schedule.

In 1868, in response to stories then circulating in the press about the Baltimore plot, Kane wrote a lengthy account of his view of the events of February 21–23, 1861. He believed the President and his family would arrive in Baltimore as planned on the Northern Central Railroad at its Calvert Street Station (later after 1950, the site of the Baltimore Sun's offices and printing plant, by Bath Street and the overhead Orleans Street Viaduct) at 12:30 p.m. on February 23, and depart on a 3 p.m. train from the Camden Street Station on the southwest side of town. That left two and a half hours to fill in a City in which the President got only about 1000 votes, and most of those, according to Kane, from "the very scum of the city." In other words, there were no sizable numbers of upper crust Lincoln supporters who might be counted on to rally around the President in a public display, and entertain him, as had continually happened on the President's previous stops coming East in New York, Harrisburg, and Philadelphia on his triumphal parade through the North from his home in Springfield, Illinois. Kane came up with a plan, which he implemented, in which John Sterett Gittings, a southern sympathizer and wealthy banker who owned the Northern Central Railroad, would travel to the village of Maryland Line (on the Mason–Dixon line with Pennsylvania), get on the President's train, and accompany him to Baltimore. Once in Baltimore, the train would make an unscheduled stop at North Charles and Bolton Streets, where Kane would meet it with carriages that would carry the new President and his family to Gittings' mansion on Mt. Vernon Place. There a sumptuous meal would be served. This plan avoided the Calvert Street Station altogether and kept the President-elect largely out of view of possible "rabble rousers". According to his own account, Kane carried out his plan exactly, with the only exception being that the new President was not aboard the train. In actuality, President-elect Lincoln having possibly already anticipated the possible plot through the information secured by and presented to him by the noted new detective Allan Pinkerton and Samuel Morse Felton Sr., President of the Philadelphia, Wilmington and Baltimore Railroad, and confirmed by some other sources. So after leaving his party in Harrisburg, Lincoln boarded a night express back to Philadelphia with Ward Hill Lamon, his trusted aide, and traveled that evening back east and had his car attached to the end of a last evening P.W. & B. train running southwest to Baltimore arriving at the east-side President Street Station at 3 a.m. With his lonely night car pulled slightly west along Pratt Street to the Camden Street Station, where it was held for a short while then placed at the end of a Baltimore & Ohio Railroad train to Washington where the sleepy President-elect and his bodyguard (and possibly another armed man) arrived at the B. & O. Station in the Nation's Capital at 6 a.m. taking up residence in the noted Willard's Hotel on Pennsylvania Avenue three blocks from the White House of out-going 15th President James Buchanan. Newspaper accounts variously described Mrs. Lincoln and the boys being met by an unruly crowd in the Calvert Street Station disappointed in not seeing the new President. They later also followed on the B. & O. later that day. Kane, in his memoirs of the Plot and 1861, claimed this was erroneous and that Mrs. Lincoln was not jostled by the crowd, but that she had already alighted and left the station before they assembled.

=== Riot of 1861 ===
On April 18, 1861, two companies of US Artillery and four companies of militia arrived from Harrisburg at the Bolton Station, in the northern part of Baltimore. A large crowd assembled at the station, subjecting the militia to abuse and threats. According to the mayor at the time, "An attack would certainly have been made but for the vigilance and determination of the police, under the command of Marshal Kane."

Kane and others in Baltimore, knowing the fever pitch of the city, sought to learn about plans for other troops to pass through town, but their telegrams north asking for information were largely ignored, probably at least partly because of Kane's well-known Southern sympathies. So it was on the next day, April 19, that Baltimore authorities had no warning that troops were arriving from Massachusetts and Pennsylvania. The first of the troops had arrived at the President Street Station, on the east side of town, and had successfully traveled the one-mile distance along East Pratt Street via horse drawn rail cars, to the Camden Street Station (now near modern "Camden Yards"/Oriole Park baseball stadium) the west side, to continue to Washington. There a disturbance ensued that soon brought the attention of Marshal Kane. His police, (according to Mayor Brown's later memoirs), prevented a large and angry crowd "from committing any serious breach of the peace." Upon hearing reports that the mobs would attempt to tear up the rails leading toward Washington, Kane dispatched some of his men to protect the tracks.

Meanwhile, the balance of northern troops encountered greater difficulty traversing Pratt Street. Obstructions were placed on the tracks by the crowd and some cars were forced back toward the President Street station. The soldiers attempted to march the distance along Pratt Street, and according to Mayor Brown were met with "shouts and stones, and I think, an occasional pistol shot."

The soldiers fired back, and the scene was one of general mayhem. Marshall Kane soon appeared with a group of policemen from the direction of the Camden Street Station, "and throwing themselves in the rear of the troops, they formed a line in front of the mob, and with drawn revolvers kept it back. ... Marshal Kane's voice shouted, "Keep back, men, or I shoot!" This movement, which I saw myself, was gallantly executed, and was perfectly successful. The mob recoiled like water from a rock." By the time it was over, four soldiers and twelve civilians were dead. These were the first casualties of the American Civil War.

Even though Kane appears to have executed his duties faithfully during these events, and wrote an official account defending his actions (Public record defense by Marshall George P. Kane of his actions on April 19, 1861, in dealing with the riot in Baltimore that "shed the first blood of the Civil War"), there is no question that he was very pronounced in his Southern sympathies. After the riot, Marshal Kane telegraphed to Bradley T. Johnson in Frederick, MD. as follows:

Streets red with Maryland blood; send expresses over the mountains of Maryland and Virginia for the riflemen to come without delay. Fresh hordes will be down on us tomorrow. We will fight them and whip them, or die.

This startling telegram produced immediate results. Mr. Johnson, afterwards served as a general in the Confederate States Army, commanding the Maryland regiments came with volunteers from Frederick by special train that night and other county military organizations began to arrive. Virginians were reported hastening to Baltimore.

=== Kane's arrest ===
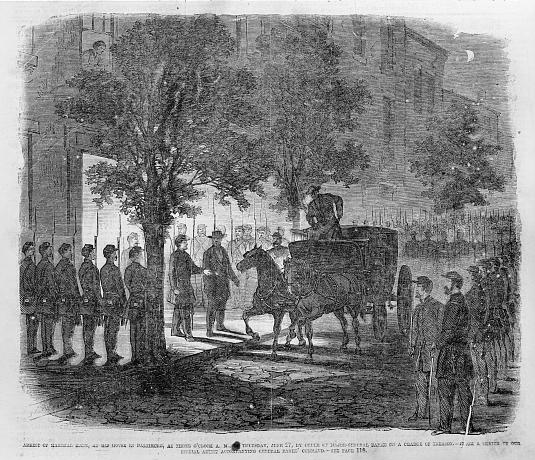
George P. Kane's Arrest at his home in Baltimore, three o'clock a.m. Thursday, June 27, 1861

However, after days of excitement and suspense, the upheaval subsided, and soon General Benjamin Butler, commander of the Massachusetts state militia, with a strong Federal force of the 6th Massachusetts and several other regiments from other states, took possession of Baltimore's Federal Hill by night during a driving rainstorm, May 10, 1861, where he erected extensive fortifications. For the rest of the period of the war Baltimore was closely guarded by Northern troops. Within the year, the city was surrounded by a dozen or more heavily fortified earthen embankment forts making the city, the second-most heavily fortified city in the world at that time, next to Washington, D.C., the Nation's Capital.

Marshal Kane remained in office as head of the Baltimore City police until June 27, 1861, when he was arrested in the dead of night at his house on St. Paul Street by a detachment of Federal soldiers and taken to Fort McHenry. From there he was sent to Fort Lafayette in New York. From there he wrote a letter to President Lincoln in September, 1861, describing the fever from malaria he contracted at Fort McHenry, and the inhumane conditions at Fort Lafayette. "Whilst suffering great agony from the promptings of nature and effects of my debility I am frequently kept for a long time at the door of my cell waiting for permission to go to the water-closet owing to the utter indifference of some of my keepers to the ordinary demands of humanity." Later he was moved to Fort Warren in Boston. In all he was confined for 14 months. He was released in 1862 and went to Montreal.

=== Kane in the Civil War ===
As the Civil War was beginning, Kane was moved from Fort McHenry to Fort Lafayette, and then to Fort Columbus, New York. From there he wrote to Secretary of State William H. Seward in October 1861 asking for a speedy trial and complaining that the conditions at Lafayette had been so bad that he required medical care for "an affection of the heart which I attribute to the nature of my confinement at Lafayette." This heart condition may have precluded his service later on the field of battle for the Confederacy. Eventually Kane was released and went to Montreal.

According to a very erroneous (unusual) "The New York Times" obituary of him on June 23, 1878, (then edited by founder Henry Raymond), Kane received a commission on General Robert E. Lee's staff, and was with Lee at Gettysburg. This seems unlikely (according to modern research and scholarship); as a letter he supposedly wrote to Jefferson Davis, President of the Confederate States was on July 17, 1863, just two weeks after the Battle of Gettysburg, and is from Canada, where Kane supposedly offers his services in organizing an expedition against Chicago, Milwaukee, and Detroit. His plan was to destroy all shipping, thus "paralyzing the lake commerce." By November, he writes Davis again from Montreal to report on the failure of a plan to rescue Confederate prisoners at Sandusky Bay in Ohio. In Canada in 1864, Lincoln assassin John Wilkes Booth, (1838–1865), presented to Confederate officials—including Kane—his plan to kidnap President Lincoln.

In February 1864, Kane ran the Federal blockade and was soon in Richmond. In 1864, he published a broadside in which he exhorted Marylanders in the Confederate States Army to form their own Maryland militias, rather than serve under the flags of other states. On July 20, 1864, he is reported by the "Charleston Mercury" to be "about to cooperate with our forces then near Baltimore, with 15,000 Maryland recruits." On October 8, 1864, he writes again to Davis, offering to recruit Marylanders to form a corps of heavy artillery, a suggestion that was politely declined. In March 1865, he is reported to have been instrumental in acquiring fresh uniforms for Marylanders in the Confederate Army. In the closing days of the war, he is still writing to Jefferson Davis to report on the movement of troops around Danville, Virginia.

=== Later life ===
Kane entered the tobacco manufacturing business at Danville, Virginia, in late 1865. Returning to Baltimore he was appointed to the "Jones Falls Commission" and was elected Sheriff of Baltimore City by the state Democratic Party in the 1873 election.

On October 27, 1877, Kane was elected Mayor of the City of Baltimore having won the Democratic nomination over Ferdinand C. Latrobe..

Kane was Mayor of Baltimore City but a short time (his then two-year term would have ended November 3, 1879). City Council ordinances receiving his signed approval were not numerous. One appropriated money for repairs to the former Old City Hall on Holliday Street near East Saratoga Street, used 1830–1875, (former Peale Museum built and operated 1813–1830 by the famed Rembrandt Peale), and transferred this historic building to the City's Board of School Commissioners for the Baltimore City Public Schools system to be used for school purposes. It soon became the site of Baltimore's first African American (then referred to as "Colored"/"Negro") in the new racially segregated "Colored Schools" established a few years before to the BCPS in 1865. Another Kane-signed ordinance was to give "Authority to condemn and open Wolfe Street from East Monument Street to North Avenue and Patterson Park Avenue from Oliver Street to North Avenue" and was granted. A Council resolution to appoint a committee to visit and urge upon the United States Congress the necessity of constructing a new post-office was approved by Mayor Kane and also an ordinance to accept Homewood Park (a part of the present site of Johns Hopkins University—near Homewood Mansion, a Georgian–Federal style of architecture, constructed 1801–1808, formerly of the Carroll family and later William Wyman's "Wyman Villa" estates) which was signed April 8, 1878. This ordinance, however, was not carried into effect at that time, as JHU did not move from its newly established "temporary" downtown campus on North Howard Street near Little Ross, West Centre and West Monument Streets until after the turn of the century.

Colonel George Proctor Kane died, while serving as the mayor of his home city, on June 23, 1878. His former opponent, Ferdinand C. Latrobe was elected to serve his unexpired term (and began his own long and honored public service career, being elected to seven terms of office and dominating the political life of Baltimore for a quarter-century). Kane was buried at New Cathedral Cemetery in Baltimore.

== Notes ==
Preceded by Ferdinand Claiborne Latrobe	Mayor of Baltimore; 1877–1878	Succeeded by Ferdinand Claiborne Latrobe
