= William T. Malster =

American politician and shipbuilder (1843–1907)

William Torbert Malster
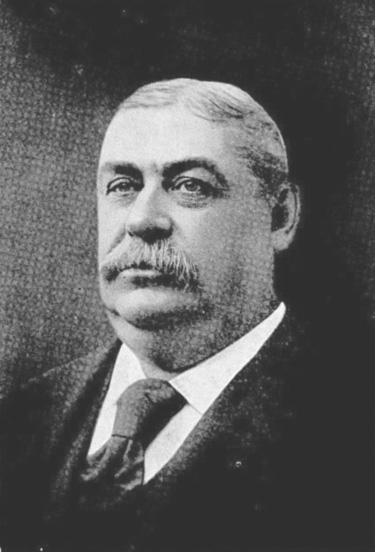
- Portrait of Malster (c. 1897)

32nd Mayor of Baltimore
- In office November 17, 1897 – November 15, 1899
- Preceded by: Alcaeus Hooper
- Succeeded by: Thomas Gordon Hayes

Personal details
- Born: April 4, 1843 Chesapeake City, Maryland, U.S.
- Died: March 2, 1907 (aged 63) Baltimore, Maryland, U.S.
- Resting place: Bethel Cemetery; Elkton, Maryland, U.S.
- Party: Republican
- Spouses: Bridget "Jennie" Leary (m. 1870) Florence N. Hill (m. 1886; died 1891) Anna L. Conroy Hardcastle (m. 1898)
- Children: 2
- Occupation: Politician; shipbuilder
- Military career
- Branch: Union Army
- Conflicts: American Civil War

William Torbert Malster (April 4, 1843 – March 2, 1907) was Mayor of Baltimore from 1897 to 1899. He was the founder and president of Columbian Iron Works Company, a shipbuilding company in Baltimore.

== Early life ==
William Torbert Malster was born on April 4, 1843, in Chesapeake City, Maryland, to Jeremiah Malster. His father was a colonel in the Confederate States Army and school teacher. Malster attended public school in Cecil County. Malster served as an engineer in the Union Army during the American Civil War. Malster tried a number of occupations as a boy, including farming, the grocery business, selling confectionery, painting, blacksmithing and carpentering. He ultimately found employment on a steamer. He then made study of steam engineering, and passed an examination before the United States inspectors.

== Career ==
Malster became a fireman and then an engineer on a canal freight boat. He advanced in his profession and then became chief engineer on an ocean transport. In 1871, Malster founded a small plant for engines and steamers on Caroline Street in Baltimore. He later established his business on Ann Street in Baltimore. There they built the steamer Enoch Pratt and the hull of the ice boat F. C. Latrobe. In 1879, Malster organized the firm Malster & Reaney at Locust Point with W. B. Reaney. It was later named Columbian Iron Works Company and incorporated in 1884. Upon its incorporation, Malster served as president and general manager. They built a number of ferryboats, steamers and cruisers, including the cruisers USS Detroit, USS Montgomery and the USS Petrel. They also developed torpedo boats and submarines. One of the contracts that helped Malster get a reputation was a yacht he built for Henri Say, a relative of Léon Say. The yacht was reported as the biggest yacht in the world for its time. They also built the SS Maverick, a tank steamer built for Standard Oil that was the first to carry oil in bulk. His company also built the Calvert Street Bridge over Jones Falls and the a cable road in Philadelphia, the first east of the Rocky Mountains.

Malster was a Republican. He ran for Mayor of Baltimore in 1893, but lost to Ferdinand C. Latrobe. He ran again in 1897. While running, Malster worked to increase the black vote in his election by promising black leaders three black nominees (one from each legislative district) on the Republican ticket for Maryland House of Delegates. The proposed nominees included Whitfield Winsey, William Ashbie Hawkins and Walker W. Lewis, a grocer. Only Winsey came close to nomination, but ultimately Malster and his "Malsterites" reneged on the deal. He defeated Theodore Marburg in the Republican primary and Henry Williams in the general election.

Malster served as mayor from November 17, 1897, to November 15, 1899. While mayor, the new 1898 charter for the city was made. For this, he was nicknamed "The Charter Mayor". Following the charter, Malster also served as president of the Board of Estimates while mayor. He was defeated for re-election in 1899 by Thomas Gordon Hayes. During his administration, a general plan for street improvement was passed, and the city prohibited the further use of cobblestones for street paving. The Daughters of the Confederacy were authorized to erect a monument of Confederate soldiers and sailors to Mount Royal Avenue. He ran for re-election, but lost to Thomas Gordon Hayes.

Malster served as a Maryland delegate to the 1896 Republican National Convention. He was appointed as naval officer by President William McKinley at the Port of Baltimore in 1902. He served in that role until 1906.

== Personal life ==
Malster married Bridget "Jennie" Leary of Baltimore on February 1, 1870. He married Florence N. Hill, daughter of Captain Edward M. Hill, of Baltimore on June 2, 1886. He had two daughters, Florence and Sara (or Sarah), with his second wife. His second wife, Florence, died on May 16, 1891. He married Anna Laura (née Conroy) Hardcastle, widow of Dr. Marion L. Hardcastle, of Chesapeake City on February 16, 1898.

Malster died on March 2, 1907, at his home at 1811 North Charles Street in Baltimore. He was buried at Bethel Cemetery in Elkton, Maryland.

Political offices
Preceded by Alcaeus Hooper	Mayor of Baltimore; 1897–1899	Succeeded by Thomas Gordon Hayes
