= 1899 Baltimore mayoral election =

Baltimore mayoral election, 1899
- May 2, 1899
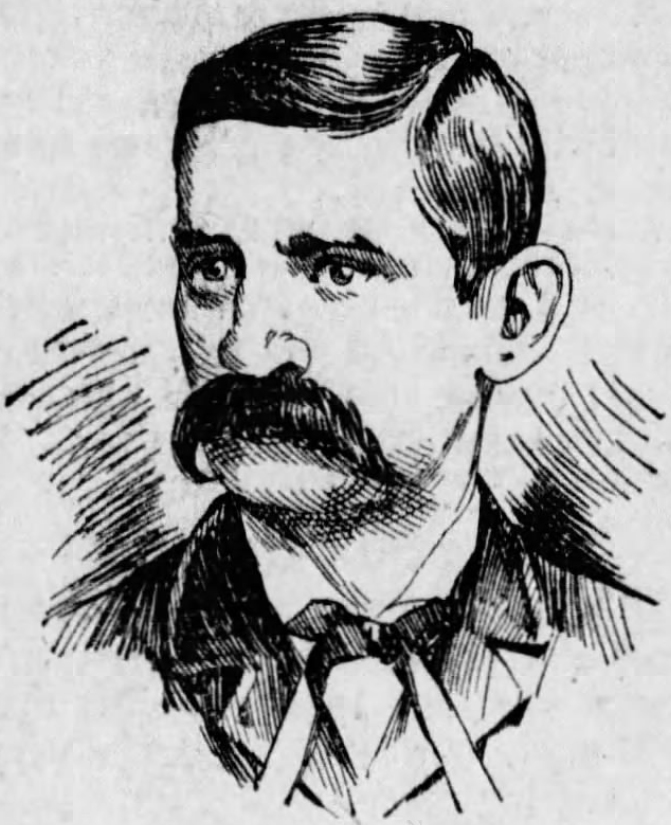

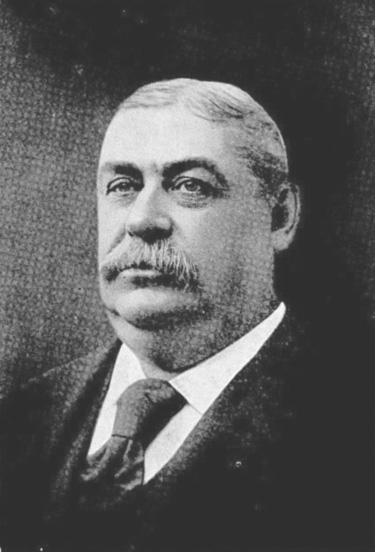
| Candidate | Thomas Gordon Hayes | William T. Malster |
| Party | Democratic | Republican |
Mayor before election
William T. Malster
Republican
Elected mayor
Thomas Gordon Hayes
Democratic

The 1899 Baltimore mayoral election saw Thomas Gordon Hayes defeat incumbent mayor William T. Malster by a 8,748 vote margin-of-victory. This was the first election under a new charter that extended mayoral terms from two years to four years and moved mayoral elections to May.

By campaigning on a "good government" platform, Democrats managed to defeat Malster, who in his previous election had defeated Democrat Henry Williams by a 6,000 vote margin-of-victory.
