= Bank of Baltimore =

Former bank based in Baltimore, Maryland, US

The Bank of Baltimore was a bank based in Baltimore, Maryland, that was chartered in 1795 and failed during the Panic of 1857. It was the seventh American bank to begin business in the United States and the second bank in Maryland.

== History ==
=== Charter ===
The Bank of Baltimore was chartered on Christmas Eve, December 24, 1795, with $1,200,000 capital in the city of Baltimore, Maryland. The bank was the seventh American bank to begin business in the United States and the second bank in Baltimore, and in Maryland. The Charter provided that subscriptions would be opened the first Monday of the following June 1796 for 1,240 shares under the superintendence of the leading business men and civic leaders of Baltimore, including:

- David Stewart
- William Winchester
- Thorowgood Smith (future mayor)
- William Wilson
- Archibald Stewart
- George Salmon
- James West
- Thomas Usher, Jr.
- Henry Payson (Unitarian Church founder)
- Thomas Hollingsworth
- Nicholas Rogers (of "Druid Hill")
- Elias Ellicott
- Joseph Swann
- Andrew Buchanan
- Solomon Etting
- Charles Ghequiere
- Hugh McGurdy
- Christopher Johnston

Subscriptions for stock were also received from other parts of the state. On October 14, 1796, the bank's share-holding members elected directors:

- David Stewart
- William Wilson
- William Winchester
- George Salmon
- James West
- William Lorman
- Elias Ellicott
- John Stump
- John Stricker (future militia general in War of 1812)
- Charles Gehquiere
- Christopher Johnston
- Solomon Etting
- Lewis Pascault
- Charles Ridgely
- Thorowgood Smith (future mayor)

Smith, Hollingsworth, Winchester and Etting were authorized to receive proposals for offices or a house or securing a lot on which to erect a bank building.

=== 1790s ===
During the years 1790 to 1800 the Bank of Maryland, first financial institution in the newly emergent Town and City of Baltimore (town incorporated as a city, 1796–1797) and the state of Maryland and was in need of increased capital to meet demand. The Bank unsuccessfully attempted to double its capital in 1795. As a substitute, the B. of M. proposed to the General Assembly of Maryland, (the Maryland State Legislature) to grant a charter to establish another bank which might later consolidate with the Bank of Maryland, upon consent of both parties. this clause was later stricken and so this "Bank of Baltimore" was chartered as an entirely separate institution, receiving its charter in 1795. However, the Bank of Maryland might later become a holder of the Bank of Baltimore stock.

The charter of this bank was for 20 years and the state reserved the right to subscribe for 6000 shares at $300 each, and appoint two of seventeen directors annually. The first president of the bank was George Salman, elected in 1796 and served until 1807. Additional presidents during the B. of B.'s first century were as follows: William Wilson, 1807 and succeeded in 1824 by Brig. Gen. John Stricker (of 1814's Battles of North Point and Baltimore fame in the War of 1812) until his death June 23, 1825, and William Lorman was elected in his place. Mr. Lorman was succeeded by Joseph H. McCulloh in 1841 who was followed in December 1853 by C.C. Jamison, the former chief cashier, who died a decade later Sept. 9, 1863. On Oct. 1, 1863, Gen. Henry A. Thompson was elected as the seventh president, serving until his death on March 12, 1880. He in turn was followed by Christian Devries.

=== Cashiers ===
The bank had only four chief cashiers during its existence:

- James Cox, served 1796-1841
- C.C. Jamison, 1841-1853
- Patrick Gibson, 1853-1868
- J. Thomas Smith, 1868-1881

=== Location ===
The bank was in one location for its place of business from its organization to its first century, but the building of that time was not completed until 1856–1857.

=== Reorganization ===
The institution was reorganized as the "National Bank of Baltimore" in July 1865. During its first century, it had not missed any payments of dividends or made any reduction in the amount of its capital. However, in November 1864, along with several other city banks, it suffered from a gang of forgers and in December later that year a temporary loss of $23,000 from a falsification by one of its clerks, however later made good. On September 17, 1878, $27,850 in bonds and $35,000 in cash were stolen from the vaults in broad daylight.

The capital stock of the bank in 1880 was $1,210,700 and its surplus fund was $365,000.

The capital of the bank was fixed by the General Assembly of Maryland, the state legislature at $1,200,000, though the petitioners wanted the limit placed at $3,000,000, with provision for increasing it ultimately to $9,000,000, as growth demanded.

In 1795, the two banks ("Maryland" and "Baltimore") had an aggregate capital of $1,500,000 which was actively employed in the city of Baltimore whose export in trade was valued at more than $9,000,000 and which was rapidly growing in the area of manufacturing. Maryland's total exports for 1799 were $16,300,000.

In 1802, the third President of the United States, Thomas Jefferson from 1801 until 1809, wrote to his Secretary of the Treasury, Albert Gallatin, expressing concerns that the Government was granting too many demands to the First Bank of the United States political lobby. This concerned President Jefferson because this would grant the United States Bank the ability to "shallow up the other" smaller banks such at the Bank of Baltimore whose stock was owned by U.S. citizens and create a monopoly over the entire beginning American banking industry that would be controlled by foreign powers since the majority of stock of the United States Bank was held by citizens and subjects of other countries. Jefferson was concerned that this situation would cause problems for the United States in the event of future conflict with a foreign power and as such he supported the Bank of Baltimore's application for a deposit of government funds.

Both the Bank of Maryland contributed to the infamous "Baltimore bank riot" in August 1835, after the bank encountered financial problems the year before in 1834. Along with a series of other civil strife in the crowded and dirty city which spread to several other city financial and public institutions with extensive downtown fights, burnings and civil unrest, along with mobs of disgruntled citizens torching of several prominent citizens' and civic leaders' townhouses such as Reverdy Johnson, William Glenn, and mansions, predating the worse and far deeper and longer of the first major national financial recession of the so-called "Panic of 1837" two years later which marred the reputation and the end of the Andrew Jackson presidential administration and his unregulated free-wheeling financial policies.

=== Bank failure ===
The Bank of Baltimore failed during the financial recession known as the "Panic of 1857".

== Other banks ==
An additional financial institution of a similar name entitled the "Savings Bank of Baltimore" was chartered in 1818 with a general meeting held on "New Year's Day", January 1, 1818, at Gadsly's Hotel (or Gadsby's?) with the Right Rev. James Kemp presiding, the Bishop of the Episcopal Diocese of Maryland with Isaac Burneston as secretary. After examining the plans and situations of several similar other thrift institutions in other cities, it was resolved that it was expedient to establish a Savings or Provident Bank in Baltimore. David Winchester, Henry Brice and Charles G. Appleton were accordingly appointed a committee to draft a constitution which was later reported on and adopted at the following meeting on January 15, when the same committee and the addition of Abner Neal and Isaac McPherson were authorized to call upon the citizens of Baltimore with appropriate publicity to become members of the association. An election was then held on February 2, 1818, at the Gadsby's Hotel (near the wharves) and the following were elected as directors for the following twelve months:

- Daniel Howland (also as president)
- Samuel J. Donaldson
- Fred W. Brune
- John Hoffman
- W.R. Swift
- Roswell L. Colt
- John Sinclair
- Alexander Irvine
- Charles Warfield
- Isaac Tyson
- William Krebs
- John McKean
- Thomas W. Griffith, (author/historian)
- William Childs
- Joseph Cushing
- Henry Brice
- Henry Lorman
- Evan T. Ellicott
- William Hopkins
- William Stewart
- Thomas Sheppard
- George S. Baker
- John C. Richards

On March 16, 1818, the bank opened for the reception of deposits at No. 100 Market Street (now Baltimore Street). The first report of January 15, 1819 reported that: Deposits $15,957.00 (138 depositors) Withdrawals $3,308.44 (41 depositors) Leaving to the credit of depositors: $12,648.62 Interest that has accrued: $342.37 Disbursements: Interest paid depositors: $89.82 Amount paid for stationery: $74.92 Salary paid for secretary (1 year): $150.00 Sub-total, disbursements: $314.74, Interest in U.S. Bonds, at 6%: $6,000 Amount placed in local bank with interest at 6%: $6,676.25 TOTAL disbursements: $12,990.99.

The Bank was further chartered by the State on January 30, 1819. In March 1819, the list and occupations of depositors were as follows:

- 9 widows
- 9 spinsters
- 7 married women
- 16 female servants
- 2 clergymen
- 5 schoolmasters
- 2 merchants
- 2 farmers
- 5 charitable societies
- 9 minors
- 4 clerks
- 40 mechanics
- 5 tavern-keepers
- 5 draymen
- 6 laborer
- 10 tailors
- 3 barbers
- 3 bootblacks
- 2 sailors
- 13 male servants

Which totaled 157 depositors.

In 1834, the Bank was situated in the basement level of the landmark Merchants' Exchange (designed by famous architect Benjamin Henry Latrobe, built 1815–1820), with the entrance at South Gay Street, between Water and East Lombard Streets. In 1846, the dwelling of Col. Thomas Tenant at the northwest corner of South Gay and Second Streets was purchased for $10,000 and the S.B. of B. moved there in September.

At one time the Bank was only open one day out of the week and its business conducted by the directors in person who were divided into committees and performed a large portion of the clerical labor.

Comparing the financial statistics in 1880 below with those of the first year of 1818–1819, above: Amount of funds, Dec. 31, 1879: $13,667,002.01 Received from depositors in 1880: $2,647,222.03 Interest on loans, dividends on stocks, etc. in 1880: $796,695.43 Less premiums paid on stocks purchased: ($176,771.50) Total funds: $16,934,148.87. Amount paid depositors during 1880, including principal and interest: $2,185,965.64 Amount paid to expenses: $30,894.50 Amount paid to taxes: $20,730.88 Total Expenses: $2,237,591.02 TOTAL amount of funds on hand, Dec. 31, 1880: $14,696,557.85.

Eventually the Savings Bank of Baltimore grew with both the small and large savings of many of the city's citizens, rich and poor, great and minor. In 1907 after the Great Baltimore Fire of February 1904, which devastated the downtown business district, the Bank built a "Temple of Thrift", a beautiful landmark Greco-Roman pillared marble headquarters building at the geographic center of the city at the southeast corner of South Charles Street and East Baltimore Street. In the 1980s, the S.B.B. expanded its offices into a narrow office building to its east and re-cladding the front façade to resemble the older Classical style of its 1907 headquarters.

=== Later years ===
Later by the 1990s, the bank relocated its headquarters two blocks further east to a new skyscraper at the northwest corner of East Baltimore Street and North Calvert Street, on the former site of Rembrandt Peale's "Baltimore Museum and Gallery of Fine Arts" of the 1830s, later operated by P.T. Barnum. They moved subsequently to the 1884 Baltimore and Ohio Railroad Central Headquarters building, which was destroyed in the Great Fire of 1904 and replaced by the Emerson Hotel. The bank went through several quick mergers and bank name changes and is now owned by Wells Fargo Bank.

Finally, to simplify its name after 170 years of history, tradition and reputation, the bank dropped the word "Savings" from its title, becoming briefly known as the "Bank of Baltimore Building".

This later "Bank of Baltimore" is one of the several predecessor banks that were eventually consolidated two decades later into an out-of-town financial institution SunTrust with headquarters in another prime city, making Baltimore a "branch town".
