= Jesse Hunt =

American politician (1793–1872)

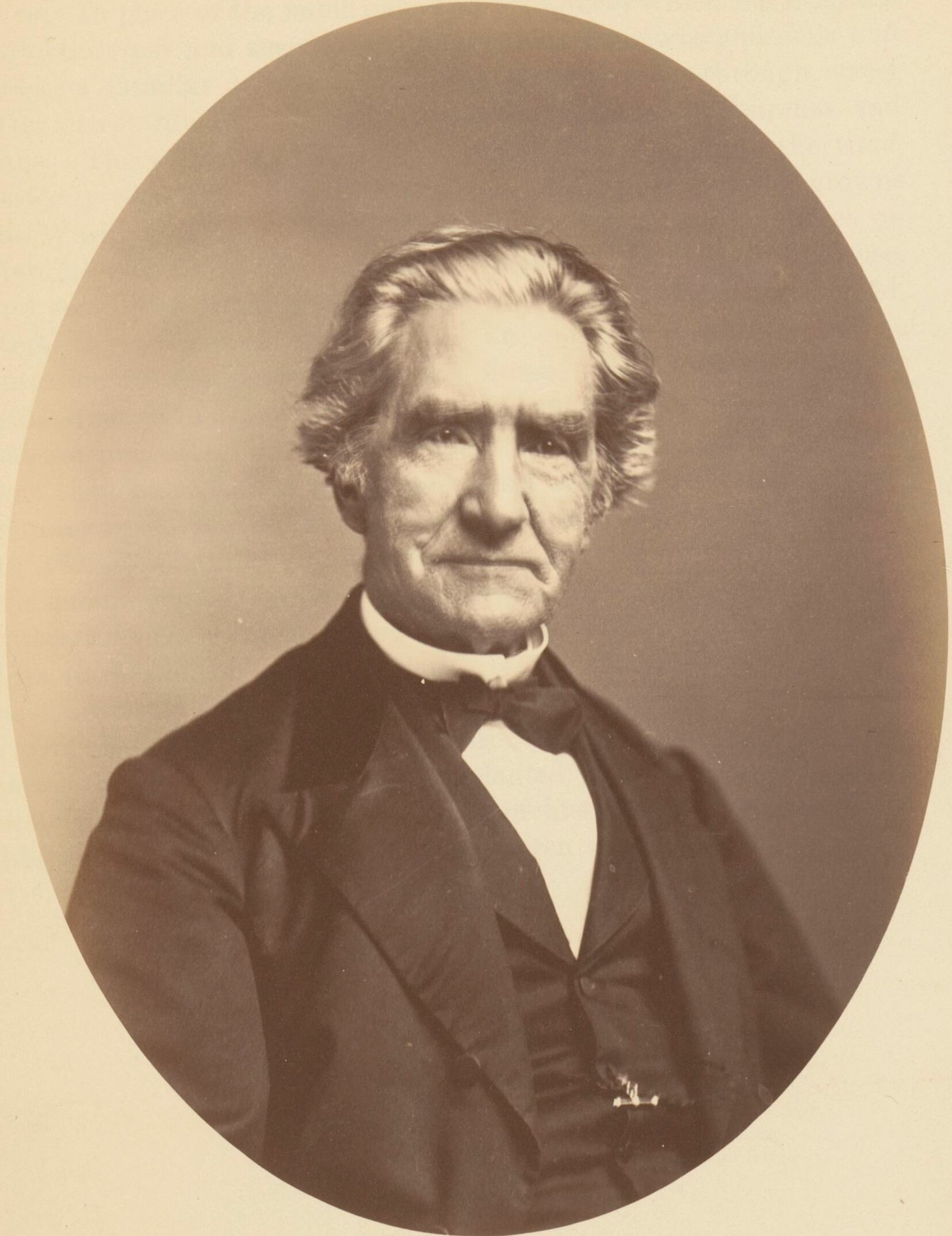
- Portrait of Hunt

8th Mayor of Baltimore
- In office November 1832 – August 11, 1835
- Preceded by: William Steuart
- Succeeded by: Samuel Smith

Member of the Maryland House of Delegates
- In office 1829–1831

Personal details
- Born: July 3, 1793 Baltimore County, Maryland, U.S.
- Died: December 8, 1872 (aged 79) Baltimore, Maryland, U.S.
- Resting place: Green Mount Cemetery; Baltimore, Maryland, U.S.
- Party: Democratic
- Spouse: Margaret Yundt (died 1860)
- Children: 7
- Occupation: Politician
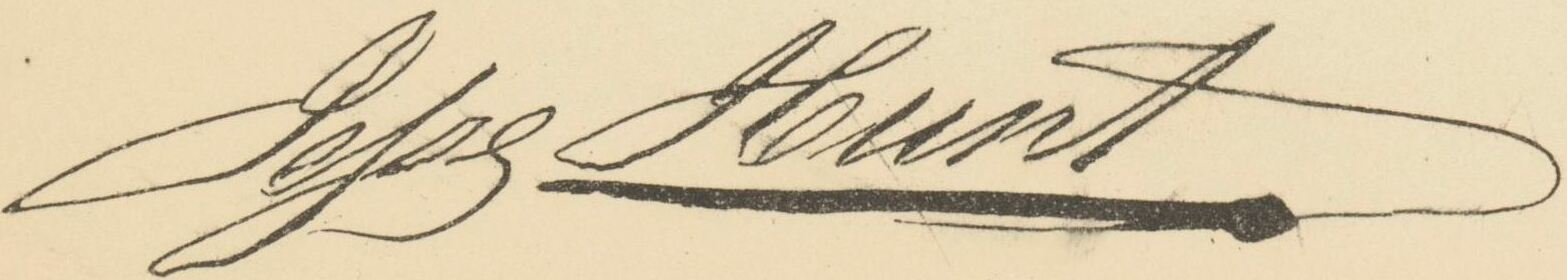
- Signature
- Military career
- Allegiance: United States
- Rank: Lieutenant
- Unit: Washington Blues (5th Maryland Regiment)
- Conflicts: War of 1812; Battle of North Point

Jesse Hunt (July 3, 1793 – December 8, 1872) was Mayor of Baltimore from November 1832 to August 11, 1835. He resigned office following a banking crisis in which, as a director of the failed bank, he was personally implicated.

== Early life ==
Jesse Hunt was born on July 3, 1793, in Green Spring Valley, Baltimore County, Maryland. He was a descendant of a pioneer family of Calvert County. His father moved from Calvert County to Green Spring Valley in 1760. In 1808, he served as an apprentice at the house of William and Richard Hall, a saddlery in Baltimore.

== Career ==
Hunt enlisted in the volunteer army and helped raise the company Washington Blues, a division attached to the 5th Maryland Regiment and was at the Battle of North Point in 1814 during the War of 1812. He later became a lieutenant and resigned his commission in 1822.

In 1815, Hunt started to work in the saddlery and harness-making business. He was elected to the Maryland House of Delegates in 1829, 1830 and 1831. In 1832, he was nominated for mayor and was elected under the Democratic ticket, defeating Jacob Small. He was re-elected in 1834.

In 1834, the Bank of Maryland, of which Hunt was a director, experienced a liquidity crisis and collapsed. Months passed and creditors grew tired of waiting in vain for a settlement, and violence soon followed. On August 6, 1835, a mob gathered and broke the windows of the house of Reverdy Johnson one of the bank's directors. Jesse attempted to protect his colleague's home, but was unable to prevent the destruction of that and many other bank directors' homes, including - eventually - his own.

Hunt, having lost control of the city, resigned five days later, on August 11, 1835. After resigning, Hunt was elected as City Register and served in that position for ten years. He became the first president of Eutaw Savings Bank and served in that position until 1871.

== Personal life ==
Hunt married Margaret Yundt and she died in 1860. He had seven children. He died on December 8, 1872, at his home in Baltimore. He was buried at Green Mount Cemetery in Baltimore.

== See also ==
- Baltimore bank riot

== Notes ==
Preceded by William Steuart	Mayor of Baltimore; 1832–1835	Succeeded by Samuel Smith
