= List of mayors of Baltimore =

Mayor of the City of Baltimore
- Flag of Baltimore

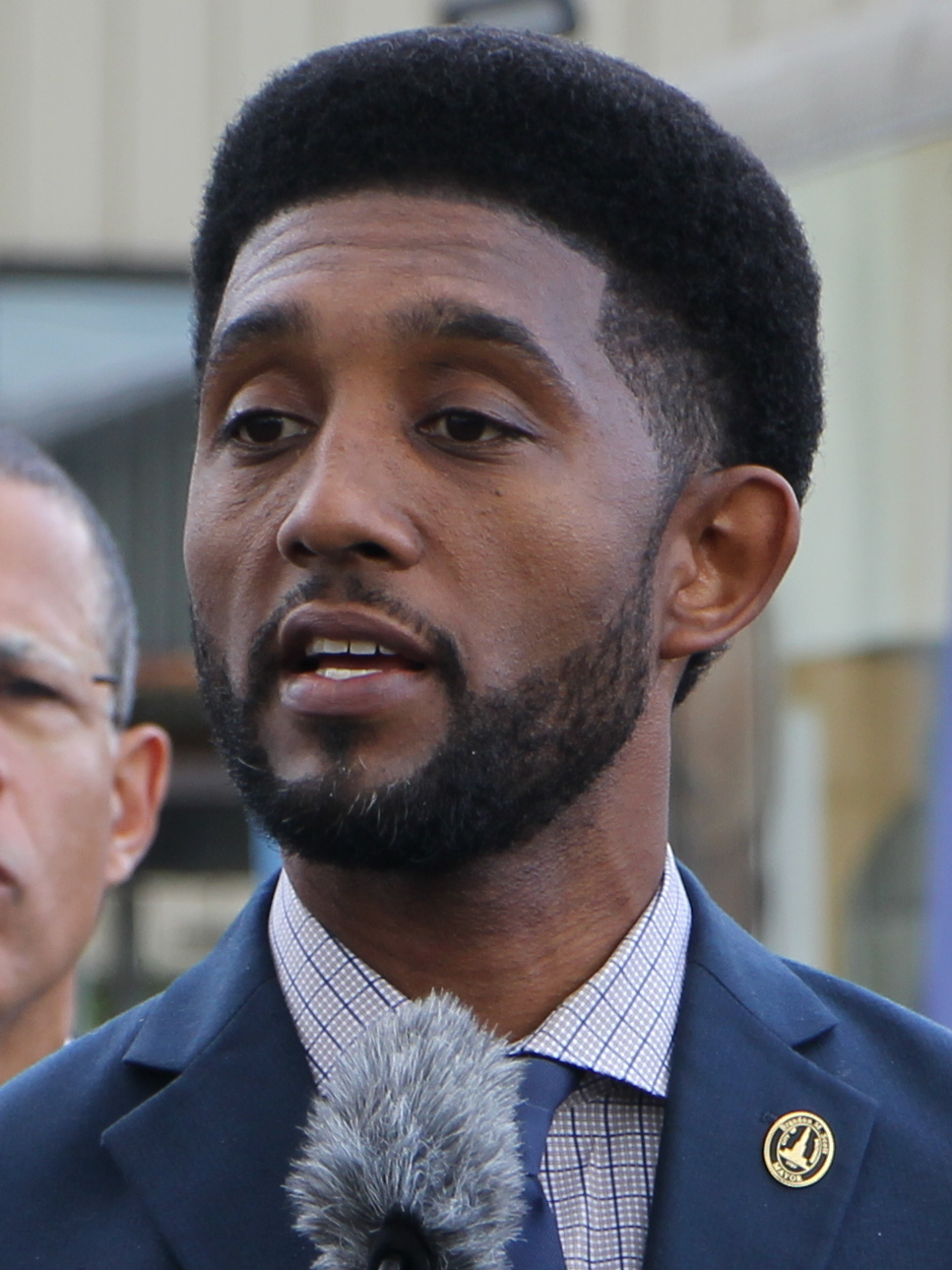
- Incumbent; Brandon Scott since December 8, 2020
- Residence: Private residence
- Term length: Four years, renewable once
- Inaugural holder: James Calhoun; 1794
- Formation: 1797
- Website: Official website

The mayor of Baltimore is the head of the executive branch of the government of the City of Baltimore, Maryland. The mayor has the duty to enforce city laws, and the power to either approve or veto bills, ordinances, or resolutions passed by the unicameral Baltimore City Council. In addition, the mayor oversees all city services, public property, police and fire protection, and most public agencies, and shares with the governor of Maryland, responsibilities for the public school system within the city limits. As of December 8, 2020, the Office of the Mayor of the City of Baltimore has changed hands 62 times, with 53 different individuals assuming office in the 223 years of city government, from 1797 to 2020. The Office of the Mayor is located in the historic Baltimore City Hall located at 100 Holliday Street in downtown Baltimore.

== History ==
James Calhoun was first elected in 1794 under the old Baltimore Town government with a group of town commissioners, and continued as the first mayor under the new City Charter in 1796–97, when the city was incorporated as the "City of Baltimore" under the authority of the Maryland General Assembly, which had originally authorized the port in 1706 and the creation of a town in 1729 and its laying out in early 1730. Calhoun continued to serve for another seven years until 1804.

Baltimore had been the county seat of surrounding Baltimore County, which had been "erected" (authorized) in 1659 as the fifth county designated in the Province of Maryland and first county in northern Maryland, since finagling a scheme to move the courthouse from old Joppa in 1767. The city was separated from the adjacent county by the provisions of the new second Maryland Constitution of 1851 and became an independent city with the same status as the other 22 (later 23) counties of Maryland. Then the seat for Baltimore County was moved after a referendum to Towsontown (later Towson), a few miles north of Baltimore, with the building there in 1854 of its first courthouse structure.

Six individuals are credited with multiple, non-consecutive returns to the office after completing an initial term, and are counted as separate mayoralties. These are: Edward Johnson (twice), John Montgomery, Ferdinand C. Latrobe (elected four times), Howard W. Jackson, William F. Broening, and Theodore R. McKeldin.

The mayor was originally elected to a term of two years under the original City Charter of 1796–1797. In 1920, the charter was amended so that the mayor serves a term of four years. A 2022 charter amendment limited the mayor to two terms.

For years, the mayor was elected in the year immediately preceding the presidential election. However, in 2012, the 2015 election was postponed to 2016 in order to better align with national elections. As a result, incumbent Stephanie Rawlings-Blake had her term extended an additional year. An earlier attempt to move the mayoral election to the same year as presidential elections was made in 1999, but went awry when the General Assembly refused to move the primary election. As a result, then-incumbent Martin O'Malley was nominated for a second term in 2003, then had to wait over a year to run in and win the general election.

Baltimore has experienced major turnover in the mayor's office in recent years, in large part due to corruption scandals. In September 2015, incumbent mayor Stephanie Rawlings-Blake announced she would not seek re-election, setting up a hotly-contested primary election in the heavily Democratic city in 2016. Maryland State Senator Catherine Pugh defeated former mayor Shelia Dixon, who resigned from office in 2010 after pleading guilty to misappropriating holiday gift cards intended to serve poor Baltimore residents. Pugh easily defeated Republican Alan Walden and Green Party candidate Joshua Harris to become the 50th mayor of Baltimore, and was sworn in on December 6, 2016. Pugh resigned on May 2, 2019, amid a scandal in which she was accused of, and eventually pleaded guilty to charges of, fraud, conspiracy, and tax evasion regarding a scheme to sell copies of a self-published children's book series, known as Healthy Holly, to the University of Maryland Medical System without competition. Upon Pugh's resignation, then-City Council President Jack Young took over as mayor. In the 2020 Democratic primary, Young went up against Dixon, his successor as City Council President Brandon Scott, former T. Rowe Price executive and Obama administration Treasury Department official Mary Miller, former federal prosecutor and Deputy Attorney General of Maryland Thiruvendran Vignarajah. Scott narrowly edged out Dixon, with Young finishing a distant fifth. Brandon Scott was elected with more than 70% of the vote in the November general election, and was sworn in as the city's 52nd mayor on December 8, 2020.

Some well-known political and historical figures to have held the office of mayor of Baltimore include:

- Samuel Smith, Revolutionary War soldier and War of 1812 commander, twice elected to the House of Representatives and Senate respectively, twice served as president pro tempore of the Senate, served as mayor from 1835 until 1838.
- Thomas Swann, member of the American Party, better known as the "Know-Nothings," served as mayor from 1856 until 1860, was elected as the 33rd governor of Maryland in 1866, and subsequently served in the House of Representatives for ten years until 1879.
- William Pinkney Whyte, served as mayor from 1881 until 1883, served three non-consecutive terms as United States senator, was elected the 35th governor of Maryland in 1872, and as attorney general of Maryland in 1887.
- Thomas D'Alesandro, Jr., served three terms as mayor from 1947 until 1959, best known outside of Baltimore as the father to future Speaker of the House of Representatives Nancy Pelosi, son Thomas D'Alesandro III also served as mayor for one term from 1967 until 1971.
- William Donald Schaefer, served four terms as mayor, the most of anyone to hold the office, from 1971 until 1987, when he became the 58th governor of Maryland. Schaefer also served as comptroller of Maryland later in life from 1999 until 2007.
- Kurt Schmoke, served three terms as mayor from 1987 until 1999, was the first African-American to be elected mayor of Baltimore.
- Martin O'Malley, served two terms as mayor of Baltimore from 1999 until 2007, when he became the 61st governor of Maryland, was a candidate for the Democratic nomination for president of the United States in 2016, dropped out of contest in the winter of 2016 after failing to secure a strong finish in the Iowa caucuses.

== List of mayors of Baltimore ==
#	Portrait	Mayor	Term start	Term end	Terms	Party	Notes
1		James Calhoun	1797	1804	5	None	Mayor of Baltimore Town from 1794.
2		Thorowgood Smith	1804	1808	2	None	
3		Edward Johnson	1808	1816	4	Democratic-Republican	
4		George Stiles	1816	1819	1 1/2	Democratic-Republican	Resigned during second term, died shortly after.
(3)		Edward Johnson	1819	1820	Partial	Democratic-Republican	Elected by the 1818 electors to finish out Mayor Stiles' term.
5		John Montgomery	1820	1822	1	Democratic-Republican	
(3)		Edward Johnson	1822	1824	1	Democratic-Republican	
(5)		John Montgomery	1824	1826	1	Democratic-Republican	
6		Jacob Small	1826	1831	2 1/2	Democratic-Republican	Resigned from office.
7		William Steuart	1831	1832	Partial	Democratic-Republican	Elected by the 1830 electors to finish out Mayor Small's term.
8		Jesse Hunt	1832	1835	1 1/2	Whig	Resigned from office.
9		Samuel Smith	1835	1838	1 1/2	Democratic	First elected in a special election to finish out Mayor Hunt's term, elected to a full term in 1836.
10		Sheppard C. Leakin	1838	1840	1	Whig	
11		Samuel Brady	1840	1842	Partial	Whig	Resigned from office.
12		Solomon Hillen Jr.	1842	1843	Partial	Democratic	First elected in a special election to finish out Mayor Brady's term, elected to a full term in 1842. Resigned from office.
13		James O. Law	1843	1844	Partial	Democratic	Elected in a special election to finish out Mayor Hillen's term.
14		Jacob G. Davies	1844	1848	2	Whig	
15		Elijah Stansbury Jr.	1848	1850	1	Democratic	
16		John H.T. Jerome	1850	1852	1	Democratic	
17		John S. Hollins	1852	1854	1	Whig	
18		Samuel Hinks	1854	1856	1	American	
19		Thomas Swann	1856	1860	2	American	
20		George W. Brown	1860	1861	Partial	Constitutional Union	Arrested and removed from office by the Union Army for Confederate sympathies.
21		John C. Blackburn	1861	1861	Partial	None	President of the First Branch of the City Council and served as mayor ex officio from Mayor Brown's arrest until October 1861.
22		Charles J. Baker	1861	1862	Partial	None	Served as mayor ex officio from October 1861 to January 1862, when Chapman was elected, until the new First Branch organized and elected a president in January 1862. He was not recognized as an acting mayor until 1989.
23		John L. Chapman	1862	1867	3 1/2	Republican	President of the First Branch of the City Council and served as mayor ex officio from January to November 1862. Elected to three terms. His final term was reduced from two years to one year per the new Maryland Constitution.
24		Robert T. Banks	1867	1871	1	Democratic	The Maryland Constitution of 1867 extended the term of office from two to four years. The term was reduced back to two years in 1870.
25		Joshua Van Sant	1871	1875	2	Democratic	
26		Ferdinand C. Latrobe	1875	1877	1	Democratic	
27		George P. Kane	1877	1878	Partial	Democratic	Died in office.
(26)		Ferdinand C. Latrobe	1878	1881	1 1/2	Democratic	First elected in a special election to finish out Mayor Kane's term, elected to a full term in 1879.
28		William P. Whyte	1881	1883	1	Democratic	
(26)		Ferdinand C. Latrobe	1883	1885	1	Democratic	
29		James Hodges	1885	1887	1	Republican	
(26)		Ferdinand C. Latrobe	1887	1889	1	Democratic	
30		Robert C. Davidson	1889	1891	1	Democratic	
(26)		Ferdinand C. Latrobe	1891	1895	2	Democratic	
31		Alcaeus Hooper	1895	1897	1	Republican	
32		William T. Malster	1897	1899	1	Republican	
33		Thomas G. Hayes	1899	1903	1	Democratic	
34		Robert McLane	1903	1904	Partial	Democratic	Died in office.
35		E. Clay Timanus	1904	1907	Partial	Republican	President of the Second Branch of the City Council. Succeeded to the mayoralty following Mayor McLane's death.
36		J. Barry Mahool	1907	1911	1	Democratic	Lost reelection.
37		James H. Preston	1911	1919	2	Democratic	Lost reelection.
38		William F. Broening	1919	1923	1	Republican	Lost reelection.
39		Howard W. Jackson	1923	1927	1	Democratic	Did not run for reelection.
(38)		William F. Broening	1927	1931	1	Republican	Did not run for reelection.
(39)		Howard W. Jackson	1931	1943	3	Democratic	Lost reelection in 1943.
40		Theodore McKeldin	1943	1947	1	Republican	Did not run for reelection.
41		Thomas D'Alesandro Jr.	1947	1959	3	Democratic	Lost reelection in 1959.
42		J. Harold Grady	1959	1962	Partial	Democratic	Resigned following appointment as a judge to the Supreme Bench of Baltimore City (Circuit Court).
43		Philip H. Goodman	1962	1963	Partial	Democratic	City Council President. Succeeded to the mayoralty following Grady's resignation. Lost reelection to a full term.
(40)		Theodore McKeldin	1963	1967	1	Republican	Did not run for reelection.
44		Thomas D'Alesandro III	1967	1971	1	Democratic	Did not run for reelection.
45		William D. Schaefer	1971	1987	4	Democratic	Baltimore's longest-serving mayor. Resigned following his election as Governor.
46		Clarence H. Burns	1987	1987	Partial	Democratic	City Council President. First African-American Mayor of Baltimore. Succeeded to the mayoralty following Schaefer's resignation. Lost reelection to a full term.
47		Kurt Schmoke	1987	1999	3	Democratic	First African-American elected Mayor of Baltimore. Did not run for reelection in 1999.
48		Martin O'Malley	1999	2007	2	Democratic	Resigned following his election as Governor.
49		Sheila Dixon	2007	2010	Partial	Democratic	City Council President. First female mayor of Baltimore and first female elected mayor of Baltimore. Succeeded to the mayoralty following O'Malley's resignation. Elected to a full term in 2007. Resigned from office in January 2010.
50		Stephanie Rawlings-Blake	2010	2016	1 1/2	Democratic	City Council President. Succeeded to the mayoralty following Dixon's resignation. Elected to a full term in 2011. Did not run for reelection in 2016.
51		Catherine Pugh	2016	2019	Partial	Democratic	Resigned from office May 2, 2019.
52		Jack Young	2019	2020	Partial	Democratic	City Council President. Succeeded to the mayoralty following Pugh's resignation.
53		Brandon Scott	2020	Incumbent		Democratic	Inaugurated on December 8, 2020
