= William Duncan (Maryland politician) =

American politician and lawyer (1871–1925)

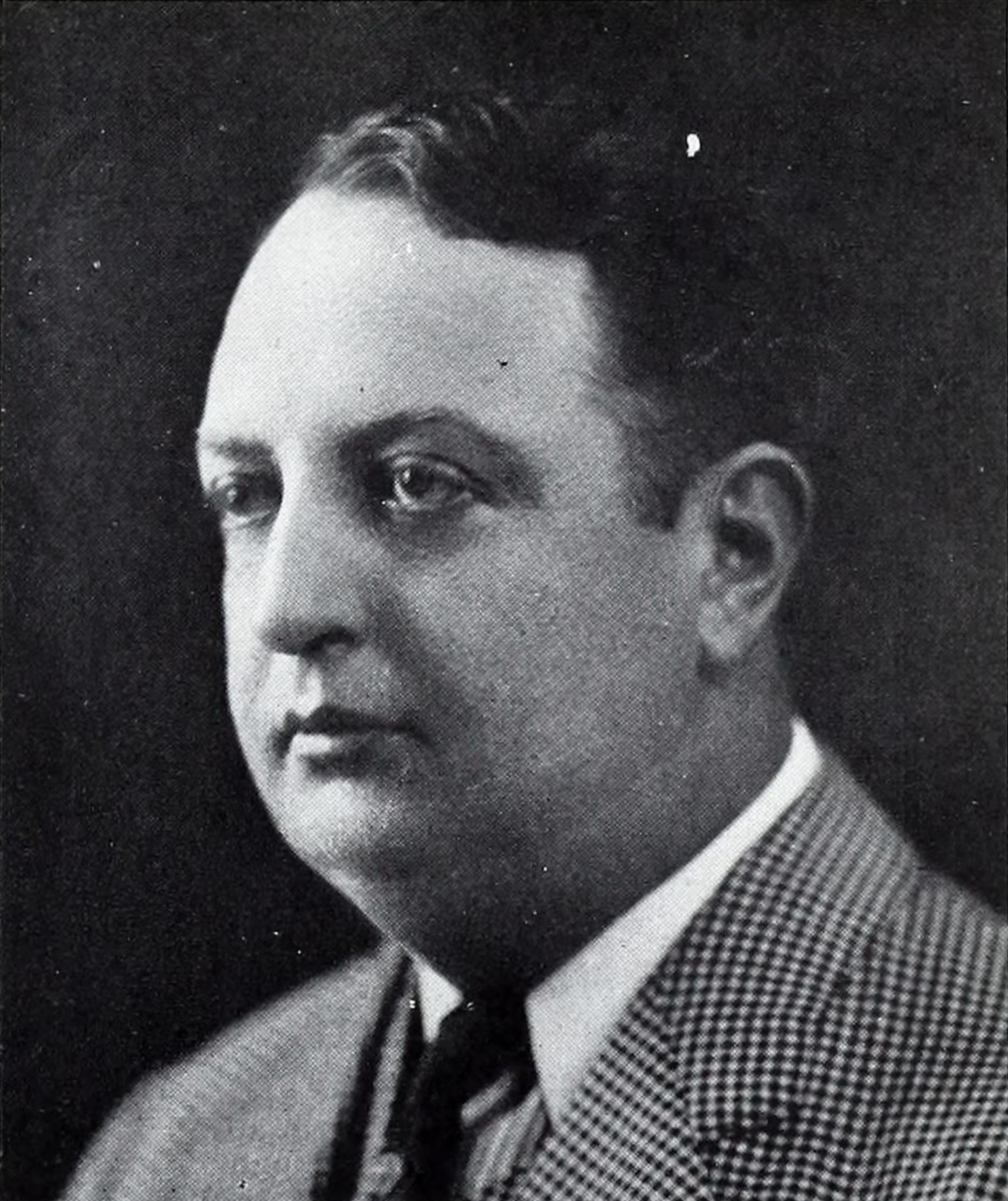
- Duncan in a 1914 publication

Member of the Maryland House of Delegates from the Baltimore's 2nd district
- In office 1900–1902 Serving with Francis P. Curtis, Aloysius Leo Knott, Ferdinand Claiborne Latrobe, Martin Lehmayer, John L. Sanford

Personal details
- Born: February 8, 1871 Baltimore, Maryland, U.S.
- Died: February 17, 1925 (aged 54) Miami, Florida, U.S.
- Resting place: Prospect Hill Cemetery; Towson, Maryland, U.S.
- Party: Democratic
- Spouse: Blanche N.
- Education: F. Knapp Institute; Loyola College
- Occupation: Politician; lawyer

William Duncan (February 8, 1871 – February 17, 1925) was an American politician and lawyer from Maryland. He served as a member of the Maryland House of Delegates, representing Baltimore's 2nd District, from 1900 to 1902.

== Early life ==
William Duncan was born on February 8, 1871, in Baltimore, Maryland, to Louisa J. (née Linzey) and James Smith Duncan. He was educated at public schools in Baltimore. He also attended F. Knapp Institute and Loyola College (later Loyola University Maryland). He was admitted to the bar in 1894.

== Career ==
Duncan started to practice law in 1894. His offices were at 713-14 Fidelity Building in Baltimore.

Duncan was a candidate for the clerk of Baltimore City Court on the Citizens' ticket. Duncan was a Democrat. Duncan served as a member of Maryland House of Delegates, representing Baltimore's 2nd District, from 1900 to 1902.

== Personal life ==
Duncan married Blanche N. They lived at 2629 North Calvert Street in Baltimore.

Duncan died from heart disease on February 17, 1925, at Hotel Dolphin in Miami, Florida. He was buried at Prospect Hill Cemetery in Towson, Maryland.
