= James Hodges (mayor) =

American politician and businessman (1822–1895)

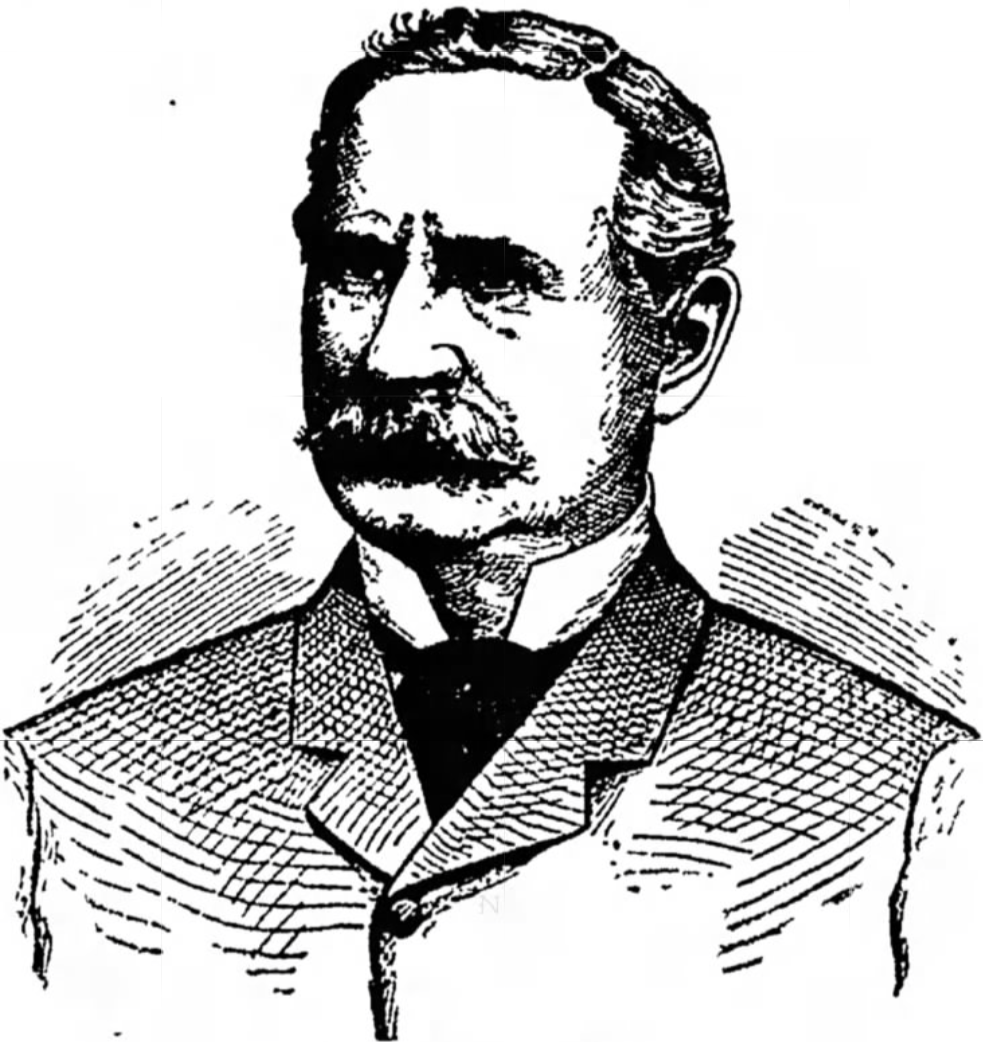

29th Mayor of Baltimore
- In office November 2, 1885 – November 7, 1887
- Preceded by: Ferdinand C. Latrobe
- Succeeded by: Ferdinand C. Latrobe

Personal details
- Born: August 11, 1822; Kent County, Maryland, U.S.
- Died: February 15, 1895 (aged 72); Baltimore, Maryland, U.S.
- Political party: Democratic
- Spouse: Josephine A. Bash (m. 1847)
- Children: 4
- Occupation: Politician; businessman

James Hodges (August 11, 1822 – February 15, 1895) was an American politician and businessman. He served as Mayor of Baltimore from 1885 to 1887.

== Early life ==
James Hodges was born on August 11, 1822, at Liberty Hall in Kent County, Maryland, to Mary Hanson (née Ringgold) and James Hodges Sr. Hodges was descended from many settlers of Kent County. William Hodges, Hodges's ancestor, came to Maryland from Virginia around 1665 and settled on a tract of land between Gray's Inn Creek and the Chesapeake Bay named Liberty Hall. Hodges's father was a farmer and represented Kent County in the Maryland legislature in 1823 and 1824. His father died in 1832.

== Career ==
Hodges moved to Baltimore and entered a commercial house. In 1846, Hodges and his brother started the firm Hodges Brothers, an importing business. Hodges became a member of the Board of Trade and attended the 1868 Philadelphia convention of the National Board of Trade. He was the author of a proposition for the government to start a Department of Commerce. He was the president of the Mercantile Library Association for several years.

In 1873, Hodges consented to be nominated for the Mayor of Baltimore, but withdrew. On May 4, 1877, Hodges was elected Commissioner of Finance in Baltimore by the Baltimore City Council, but resigned after a short time. In 1878, Hodges was nominated by President Rutherford B. Hayes to represent Maryland as an honorary commissioner at the Paris Exposition and was chosen by the Board of Trade of Baltimore to serve as a delegate at the France-American Commercial Treaty Conference.

In 1885, Hodges ran as a Democrat for the Mayor of Baltimore, defeating Judge George William Brown. He actively campaigned against the Know Nothing party and was an advocate for Sunday street car service in Baltimore. He served as mayor from November 2, 1885 to November 7, 1887. During his administration, several civil works projects began including improvements to Jones Falls, a new observatory at Federal Hill, and a one million dollar loan for Lake Clifton. A decimal system for numbering houses was instituted in Baltimore during his administration.

== Personal life ==
Hodges married Josephine A. Bash on November 30, 1847. They had four children: Mary Ella, Ida Virginia, Lily Hanson and William Ringgold.

Hodges died on February 15, 1895, at his home in Baltimore.

Political offices
Preceded by Ferdinand C. Latrobe	Mayor of Baltimore; 1885–1887	Succeeded by Ferdinand C. Latrobe
