= Thomas Gordon Hayes =

American politician (1844–1915)

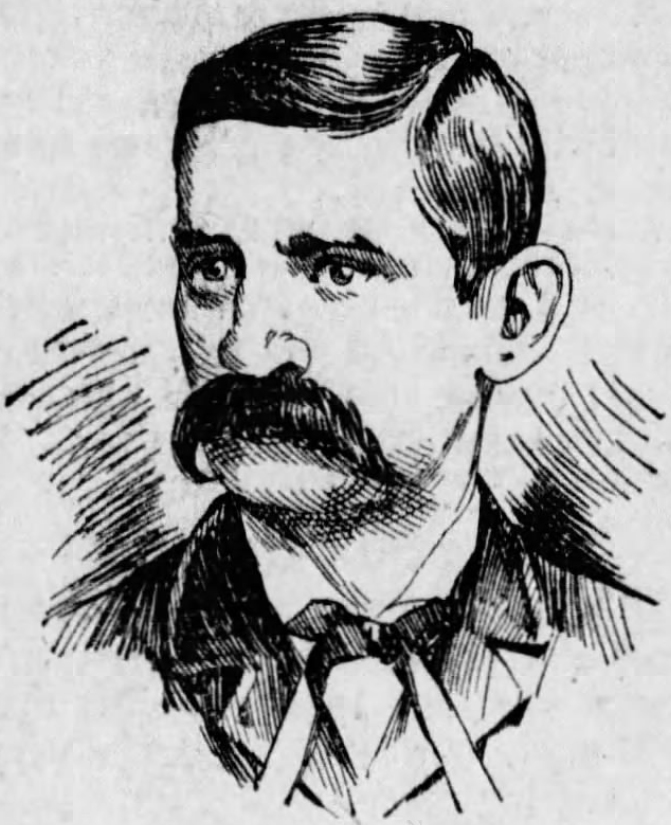
- Portrait of Hayes in The Times, 1899

33rd Mayor of Baltimore
- In office 1899–1903
- Preceded by: William T. Malster
- Succeeded by: Robert McLane

United States Attorney for the District of Maryland
- In office June 1, 1886 – 1890
- Appointed by: Grover Cleveland
- Preceded by: Archibald Stirling Jr.
- Succeeded by: John T. Ensor

Member of the Maryland Senate
- In office 1892–1896
- Preceded by: Charles S. Adams
- Succeeded by: Frank S. Strobridge
- In office 1884–1886
- Preceded by: William H. Bians
- Succeeded by: Charles S. Adams

Member of the Maryland House of Delegates
- In office 1880–1880

Personal details
- Born: January 5, 1844 Anne Arundel County, Maryland, U.S.
- Died: August 27, 1915 (aged 71) Baltimore, Maryland, U.S.
- Party: Democratic
- Occupation: Politician; lawyer

Military service
- Allegiance: Confederate States
- Branch/service: Confederate States Army
- Battles/wars: American Civil War; Battle of New Market

Thomas Gordon Hayes (January 5, 1844 – August 27, 1915) was a Democratic politician and lawyer, who served as the United States District Attorney for Maryland from 1886 to 1890 and as the Mayor of Baltimore from 1899 to 1903.

== Early life ==
Born in Anne Arundel County, Maryland, Hayes served in the 17th Virginia Infantry and in the unit that become the 10th Virginia Cavalry as a young man before entering Virginia Military Institute in January 1862. When the Civil War began, Hayes served in the Confederate army along with 247 VMI cadets who fought at the Battle of New Market. After the end of the Civil War, he came to Baltimore but soon returned to Virginia where he graduated in 1867.

== Career ==
He then started as an assistant professor of mathematics. Hayes later moved to the Kentucky Military Institute, near Frankfort, where her served as a professor of natural sciences. While living in Kentucky, Hayes studied law and was admitted to the bar in Kentucky, before returning to Baltimore in 1872.

Hayes was elected to the Maryland House of Delegates, serving in the 1880 session, and served in the Maryland Senate in 1884 and 1886. On June 1, 1886, President Grover Cleveland appointed Hayes as the United States District Attorney for Maryland. Hayes was elected as Mayor of Baltimore on May 2, 1899, defeating the incumbent Republican Mayor William T. Malster by 8,748 votes. Hayes lost in the Democratic primary to Robert McLane who succeeded him as Mayor in 1903.

== Death and legacy ==
Thomas G. Hayes died on August 27, 1915. A statue of Hayes by Edward Berge was unveiled at the Baltimore City Hall on May 5, 1919.

== See also ==
- United States Attorney for the District of Maryland

Political offices
Preceded by William T. Malster	Mayor of Baltimore; 1899–1903	Succeeded by Robert McLane
