= John Hanson Thomas Jerome =

American politician (1816–1863)

16th Mayor of Baltimore
- In office 1850–1852
- Preceded by: Elijah Stansbury Jr.
- Succeeded by: John Smith Hollins

Personal details
- Born: 1816
- Died: January 25, 1863 (aged 46–47) Govans, Baltimore, Maryland, U.S.
- Resting place: Green Mount Cemetery; Baltimore, Maryland, U.S.

John Hanson Thomas Jerome (c. 1816 – January 25, 1863) was Mayor of Baltimore from 1850–1852.

== Mayor of Baltimore ==
During Jerome's administration as Mayor of Baltimore, the McDonogh bequest was made to the city from the estate of John McDonogh – a bequest which would later result in the foundation of the McDonogh School. The Maryland Institute Hall, Marsh Market Space and Baltimore Street, was erected (though it was later destroyed in the Great Baltimore Fire of 1904 which destroyed over 1,500 buildings in the city). Bonds to the extent of $1,500,000 of the Northwestern Virginia Railroad were guaranteed by the city.

In one of his messages to the Council Mayor Jerome proposed an ambitious programme of municipal development, among which was the acquisition of Federal Hill. He also advocated the purchase of the water-works, then operated under private ownership, and he proposed that if the Gas Company would not illuminate the streets properly, the Municipality should establish its own gas plant.

The political separation of Baltimore City and Baltimore County occurred during this administration, wherein an important change became effective with the ratification by the people of the State Constitution in 1851. This resulted in Towson becoming the county seat instead of Baltimore and thus Baltimore became a separate political division of the State.

Jerome died on January 25 year 1863 at his house in Govanstown, Baltimore. He was interred at Green Mount Cemetery in Baltimore.

== Notes ==
| Preceded by Elijah Stansbury Jr. | Mayor of Baltimore; 1831–1832 | Succeeded by John Smith Hollins |
