= Alcaeus Hooper =

American politician (1859–1938)

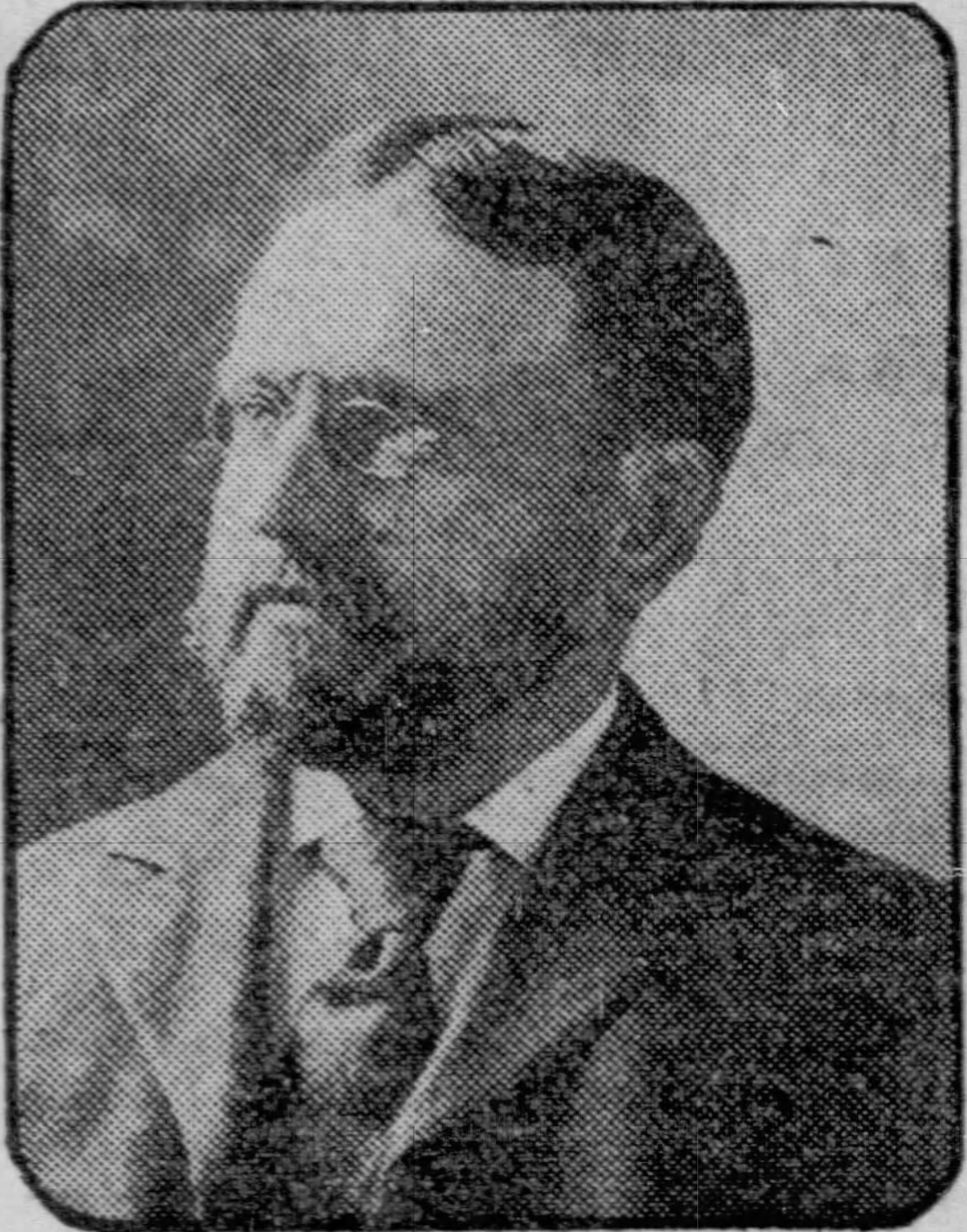
- Hooper, c. 1903

31st Mayor of Baltimore
- In office November 20, 1895 – November 17, 1897
- Preceded by: Ferdinand C. Latrobe
- Succeeded by: William T. Malster

Personal details
- Born: January 2, 1859; Baltimore, Maryland, U.S.
- Died: July 1, 1938 (aged 79); Baltimore, Maryland, U.S.
- Resting place: Druid Ridge Cemetery
- Political party: Republican
- Spouse: Florence Gees (died 1933)
- Children: 4

Alcaeus Hooper (January 2, 1859 – July 1, 1938) was the Mayor of Baltimore from November 20, 1895, to November 17, 1897.

== Early life ==
Alcaeus Hooper was born in Baltimore, Maryland, on January 2, 1859, to Catherine (née Bell) and William E. Hooper. He was named after Alcaeus of Mytilene, a Greek poet that his parents heard a lecture about. His father was a manufacturer of cotton duck. He attended Professor Eli Lamb's School (later Friends School of Baltimore), but did not attend college. He followed his father into the business and worked at William E. Hooper & Sons. After the death of his father, the company merged into a corporation named Woodberry Manufacturing Company, and Hooper served as treasurer.

== Career ==
Hooper was a member of the school board from 1888 to 1892, and was elected to the First Branch of City Council in 1893. In 1895 he was the Republican nominee for Mayor, and won over Democrat Henry Williams. Hooper was at odds with the City Council about his appointments, and won a lawsuit over it at the state Court of Appeals. After serving his one term, he again was appointed to serve on the school board. He was charged by the school board president John E. Semmes of being unfit to serve and was brought to trial in front of Mayor J. Barry Mahool. He resigned from the position on January 3, 1911.

His New York Times obituary said his 1895 mayoral campaign was "one of the stormiest in the city's history", with Hooper pitted against the Democratic machine run by Isaac Freeman Rasin. "Little more than five feet in height, he was fiery of temperament and vigorous in action."

== Personal life ==
Hooper married Florence Gees in the 1880s and she died in 1933. They had a son and three daughters: Hamilton, Caroline, Elizabeth and Florence. He owned a 120-acre apple orchard in Eagles Mere, Pennsylvania.

Hooper died at his home in Baltimore on July 1, 1938. He is buried at Druid Ridge Cemetery outside Baltimore.
