= MedChi =

State medical society of Maryland, US

The Maryland State Medical Society, commonly known as MedChi, a shortened form of the state medical society's full and ancient historic name: "The Medical and Chirurgical Faculty of the State of Maryland" is the Maryland state-level affiliate of the national body of the American Medical Association, founded in 1799. It represents the interests of physicians and citizens in the state of Maryland "from unscrupulous and untrained practitioners holding themselves out as health care providers." "MedChi" has offices in Baltimore and Annapolis, the state capital.

== History ==
MedChi was founded in January 1799, in Annapolis by 101 leaders of the medical profession in Maryland, including Dr. Tobias Watkins and Dr. Ashton Alexander, its first secretary, treasurer, and last surviving charter member. The physicians who started the organization represented most of Maryland's counties. The Maryland General Assembly approved a petition for a charter for an incorporated society of physicians in Maryland to be known as "The Medical and Chirurgical Faculty of the State of Maryland". ("Chirurgical" was the common spelling of surgical at the time of the 18th Century.)

The society became the seventh of its kind established in the country. In 1882, Whitfield Winsey was admitted to the Medical and Chirurgical Faculty of Maryland, becoming the first African American to do so.

MedChi is composed of 24 component medical societies, plus international medical graduates, residents, and medical students sections. MedChi's governing body is known as the "House of Delegates" and elects the MedChi president each year. The president of the Society must be a Maryland physician.

== Staff ==
Current MedChi staff includes:

- Gene M. Ransom III - CEO
- Eric Wargotz, M.D. - President - 178th President of MedChi

Recent Presidents of MedChi

167. Tyler Cymet 2014 168. Brooke Buckley 2015 169. Stephen Rockower 2016 170. Gary Pushkin 2017 171. Benjamin Z. Stallings 2018 172. Michele Manahan 2019 173. Shannon Pryor 2020 174. Loralie D. Ma 2021 175. James J. York 2022 176. Benjamin H. Lowentritt 2023 177. Padmini Ranasinghe 2024

Executive Directors/CEOs of MedChi

1904 Marcia Crocker Noyes, Executive Secretary

1914 Marcia Crocker Noyes, Executive Director

1947 Walter N. Kirkman, Executive Secretary/Business Manager

1958 John Sargent, Executive Director

1986 Angelo J. Troisi, Executive Director

1996 T. Michael Preston, Executive Director

2006 Dr. Martin P. Wasserman, Executive Director

2008 Steve Johnson (Interim Executive Director)

2009 Gene M. Ransom, III, CEO

== Notable past presidents ==
- Richard Sprigg Steuart: (president 1848-49, 1850–51), founder of the Maryland Hospital for the Insane, now known as Spring Grove Hospital Center, near Catonsville, Maryland.
- William H. Welch: (president 1891-92), first dean of the Johns Hopkins School of Medicine in Baltimore.
- Sir William Osler: (president 1896-97), first physician-in-chief at the Johns Hopkins Hospital, described as the "Father of Modern Medicine".
