= James Calhoun (Maryland politician) =

American politician (1743–1816)

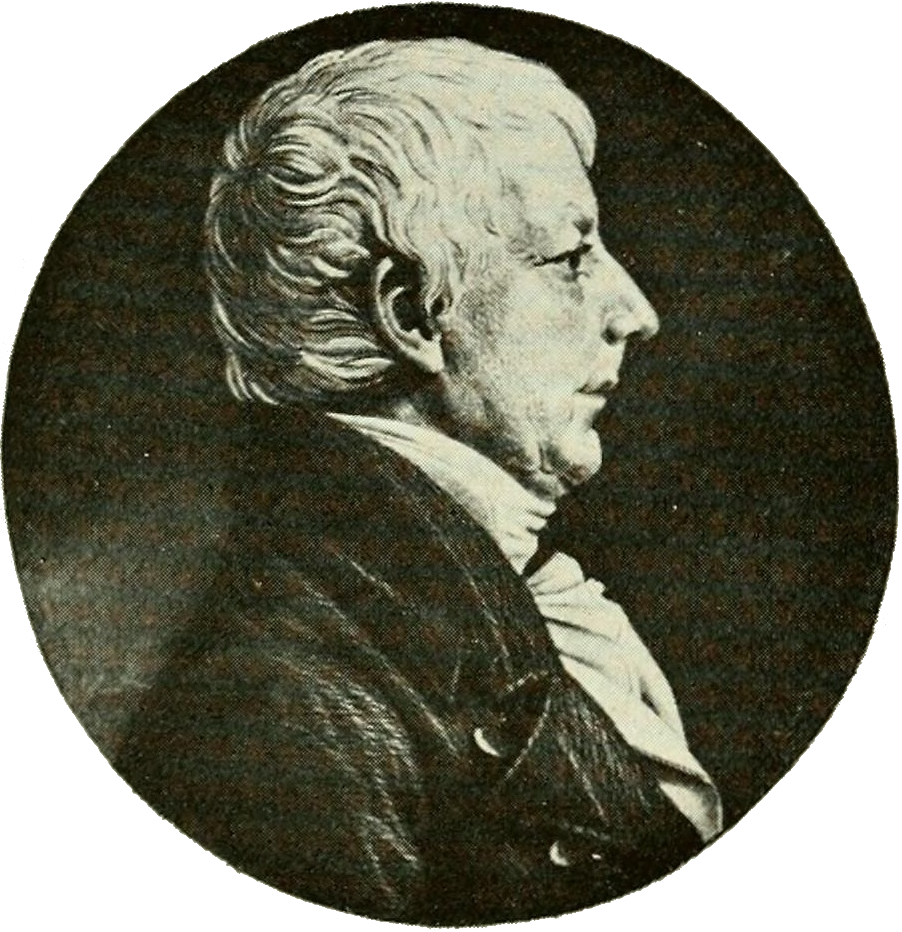
- Portrait by Charles Balthazar Julien Févret de Saint-Mémin, c. 1808

1st Mayor of Baltimore
- In office 1794–1804
- Succeeded by: Thorowgood Smith

Personal details
- Born: April 17, 1743 Carlisle, Province of Pennsylvania, British America
- Died: August 14, 1816 (aged 73)
- Resting place: Westminster Burying Ground; Baltimore, Maryland, U.S.

James Calhoun (April 17, 1743 – August 14, 1816) was an American politician from Maryland who served as the first mayor of Baltimore, from 1794 until 1804, when he resigned.

== Biography ==
Calhoun was born in Carlisle, Pennsylvania on April 17, 1743. He settled in Baltimore in 1771, where he became a successful merchant and businessman, including serving as president of the Chesapeake Insurance Company.

During the American Revolution he served in several positions to benefit the Patriot cause, including deputy commissary general and an officer in the local militia.

In addition to his business career, Calhoun was involved in local politics and government, including judge of the orphans' court.

When Baltimore was incorporated as a city, Calhoun was chosen as mayor, and he served three terms and part of a fourth, from 1794 to 1804.

He died on August 14, 1816, and was buried at Baltimore's Westminster Burying Ground.
