= John Montgomery (Continental Congress) =

American politician

John Montgomery (1722 – September 3, 1808) was an Irish-American merchant from Carlisle, Pennsylvania. He was a delegate to the Continental Congress for Pennsylvania from 1782 until 1784. Montgomery was one of the founders of Dickinson College, serving as a trustee from 1783 until his death in 1808. He died at home in Carlisle.

His son (also John) would represent Maryland in the U.S. Congress.

His father Beauford Montgomery II helped found and develop the land along the Susquehanna River, now known as Harrisburg, Pennsylvania.
