= John Smith Hollins =

Mayor of Baltimore from 1852 to 1854

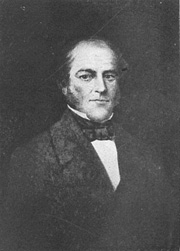
- John Smith Hollins

17th Mayor of Baltimore
- In office November 8, 1852 – November 13, 1854
- Preceded by: John Hanson Thomas Jerome
- Succeeded by: Samuel Hinks

Personal details
- Born: c. 1786
- Died: November 28, 1856 (aged 69–70)
- Spouse: Rebecca Dugan (died 1836)

John Smith Hollins (c. 1786 – November 28, 1856) was Mayor of Baltimore from 1852 to 1854.

== War of 1812 ==
During the War of 1812, at about 26 years of age, John Smith Hollins served as a first lieutenant in the company of Captain Sterrett, also known as the First Baltimore Hussars, which formed a part of the Fifth Maryland Cavalry. This unit served during the Battle of Baltimore from September 12–13, 1814.

== Mayor of Baltimore ==
John Smith Hollins served as Mayor of Baltimore from November 8, 1852, to November 13, 1854. During his tenure as Mayor, the Baltimore and Ohio Railroad was completed to the Ohio River, and a loan of five million dollars, by the municipality to this company, was authorized by Act of Assembly.

In consequence of the political separation of Baltimore City and Baltimore County, a division of the City and County Courthouse and Almshouse properties was made. Ordinances were passed providing for the erection of the Hanover Market House, and eight school buildings, as well as for bridges across Jones Falls Canton Avenue, at Eager Street and at Swann Street. Large sewers were placed in the bed of Broadway from Monument to Gay Streets. Culverts were built for Chatsworth Run at its intersections with German (Redwood) Street and at St. Peter Street.

A sewer was completed along the course of the Run through Penn Street from Pratt to Haw Streets. Provision was made for leasing lots of ground now occupied by part of the City Hall, and also for the purchase of the site of Madison Square, and an addition to Riverside Park. Legislation to open Fulton Avenue from Franklin to Pratt Streets was passed. An Act of Assembly authorizing the erection of a dam at Loch Raven for the water supply of Baltimore was approved. A market house to replace one destroyed by fire, at Fells Point, foot of Broadway, was built.

== Family life ==
Hollins married Rebecca Dugan, the daughter of a wealthy businessman and planter Cumberland Dugan, who died on 1 November 1836. In 1848, Rebecca, his daughter, became involved in prolonged litigation with her brother Frederick James Dugan who contested the terms of their late father's will; the case of Dugan-v-Hollins et al.

Hollins died on November 28, 1856.
