= Robert C. Davidson =

American politician

30th Mayor of Baltimore
- In office November 20, 1889 – November 18, 1891
- Preceded by: Ferdinand C. Latrobe
- Succeeded by: Ferdinand C. Latrobe

Personal details
- Born: December 25, 1850 Lunenburg, Virginia, U.S.
- Died: November 13, 1924 (aged 73) New York City, New York, U.S.
- Resting place: Loudon Park Cemetery; Baltimore, Maryland, U.S.
- Party: Democratic
- Spouse(s): Ida Jackson (div. 1905) Laura Banning Noyes (m. 1905; div. 1923)
- Occupation: Politician; merchant; banker

Robert C. Davidson (December 25, 1850 – November 13, 1924) was Mayor of Baltimore from 1889 to 1891.

== Early life ==
Robert C. Davidson was born on December 25, 1850, on a farm near the courthouse in Lunenburg, Virginia to Annie E. (née Johns) and William B. Davidson. His family moved to Richmond, Virginia in 1860. He moved to Baltimore, Maryland in 1865.

== Career ==
After moving to Baltimore, Davidson started working for Daniel Miller & Co. as a shipping clerk. He was promoted to confidential clerk, and was promoted again in January 1877 to a partner of the firm. With Daniel Miller, he worked as a merchant and manufacturer.

Davidson was a Democrat. He had not held public office when he ran for Mayor of Baltimore in 1889. His candidacy was backed by "The Business Men's Democratic Association" and he easily defeated incumbent Ferdinand C. Latrobe for the Democratic nomination. He defeated Major Alexander Shaw, the Fusion (Republican and Independent Democrat) candidate, and Edward Eichelberger, the Prohibition candidate. He served as mayor from November 20, 1889, to November 18, 1891. During his administration, the operation of overhead cable streetcars began. Also, the harbor was deepened, and regulations were tightened regarding the sale of perishable foods.

After serving as mayor, Davidson was elected president of the Baltimore Trust and Guarantee Company. He served in this role for 14 years, until he resigned from the role in January 1905. In May 1905, Davidson severed all business relations in Baltimore and moved to Hastings-on-Hudson, New York. He became a broker and financier in New York City.

Davidson served as director of the Western National Bank.

== Personal life ==
Davidson married Ida Jackson of Baltimore. In May 1905, Davidson left Baltimore and his wife. He sailed to Europe with Laura Banning Noyes, a nurse from Port Deposit, Maryland and the sister of Clara Noyes. His first wife and him divorced in October 1905 and he was married to his second wife in November 1905 at Riverside Church in New York City. Davidson and his second wife divorced in 1923. The divorce trial of Davidson and Laura B. Noyes was heavily reported by papers in New York and Maryland at the time.

While in Baltimore, Davidson was a member of the Eutaw Place Baptist Church.

Davidson died on November 13, 1924, in New York City. He was buried without ceremony at Loudon Park Cemetery in Baltimore.

Political offices
Preceded by Ferdinand C. Latrobe	Mayor of Baltimore; 1889–1891	Succeeded by Ferdinand C. Latrobe
