= Frank S. Strobridge =

American politician and businessman (1857–1918)

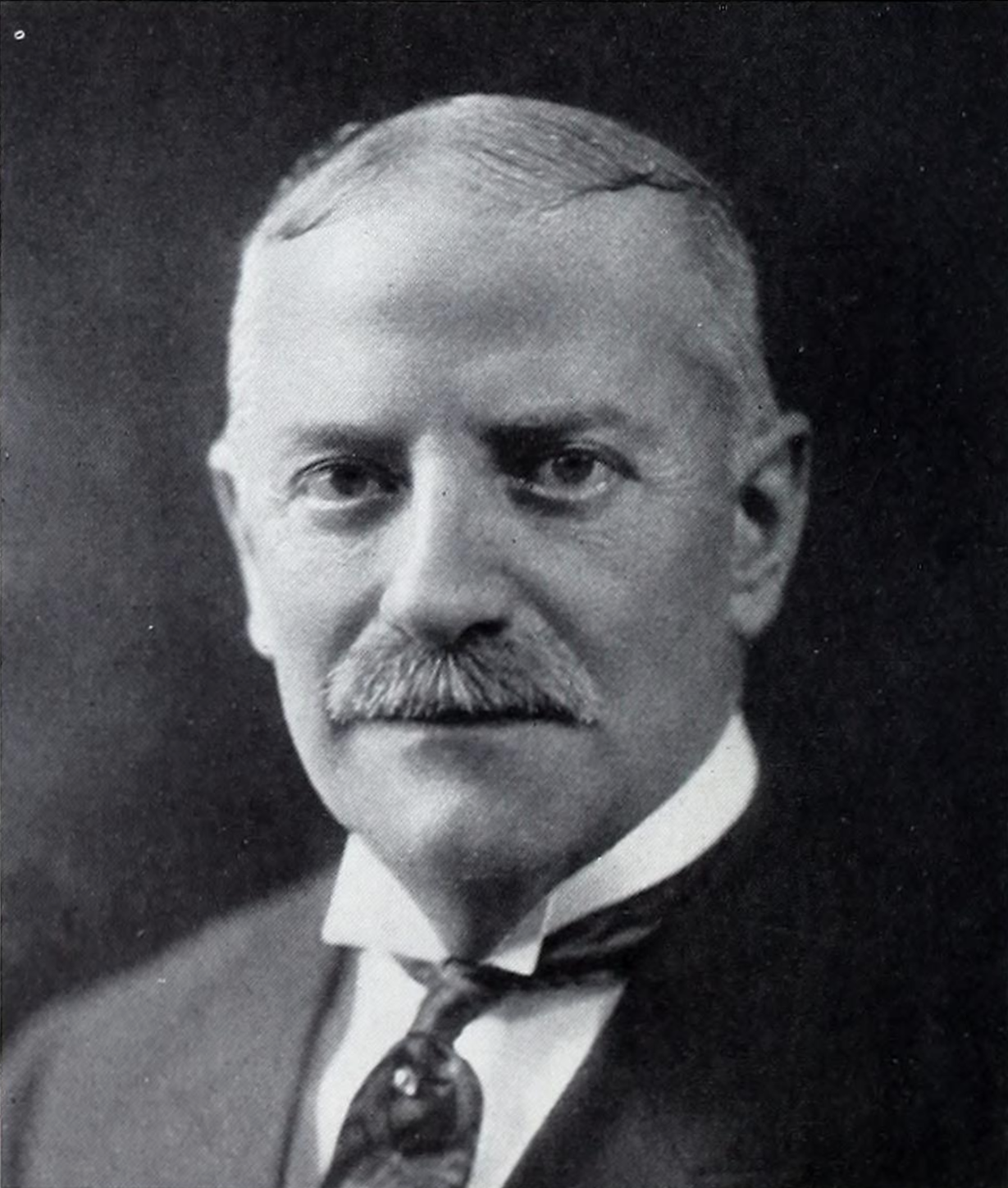
- Strobridge in 1914 publication

Member of the Maryland Senate
- In office 1896–1900
- Preceded by: Thomas G. Hayes
- Succeeded by: Olin Bryan

Personal details
- Born: Frank Stanley Strobridge; February 17, 1857 San Francisco, California, U.S.
- Died: July 22, 1918 (aged 61) Asbury Park, New Jersey, U.S.
- Resting place: Loudon Park Cemetery; Baltimore, Maryland, U.S.
- Party: Republican
- Spouse: Alice Barnes (m. 1883)
- Children: 5
- Occupation: Politician; insurance businessman

Frank Stanley Strobridge (February 17, 1857 – July 22, 1918) was an American politician and insurance businessman from Maryland. He served in the Maryland Senate from 1896 to 1900.

== Early life ==
Frank Stanley Strobridge was born on February 17, 1857, in San Francisco, California, to Rhoda Warren (née Davol) (born 1830) and Jerome M. Strobridge. He attended public and private schools in Philadelphia, Pennsylvania. He moved to Baltimore, Maryland, with his parents in 1875.

== Career ==
After moving to Baltimore, Strobridge worked at an insurance office. He was the incorporator of Baltimore Mutual Aid Society in 1881. Strobridge organized and incorporated the Baltimore Life Insurance Company on March 27, 1882. He then served as the first president until his death.

Strobridge was a Republican. Strobridge served in the Maryland Senate, representing the 3rd legislative district of the City of Baltimore, from 1896 to 1900.

Strobridge was president of the 12th Ward's Republican Club. He was also governor of the Young Men's Republican Club and served as a member of the Republican State Central Committee.

== Personal life ==
Strobridge married Alice Barnes (born 1864) in 1883. They had five children, including Frank Stanley Jr. (born 1884), J. Howard (born 1886), Elsie and Alice (born 1889).

Strobridge died on July 22, 1918, at his summer cottage at 415 Lake Avenue in Asbury Park, New Jersey. He was buried at Loudon Park Cemetery in Baltimore.
