= Robert McLane =

American Democratic politician (1867–1904)

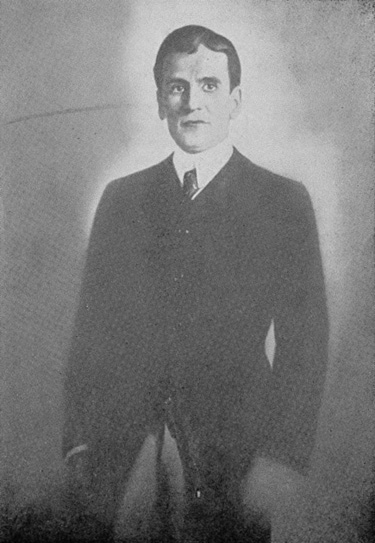
- McLane in 1903

34th Mayor of Baltimore
- In office May 19, 1903 – May 30, 1904
- Preceded by: Thomas Gordon Hayes
- Succeeded by: E. Clay Timanus

Personal details
- Born: November 30, 1867 Baltimore, Maryland, U.S.
- Died: May 30, 1904 (aged 36) Baltimore, Maryland, U.S.
- Resting place: Green Mount Cemetery
- Party: Democratic
- Spouse: Mary Lusby Van Bibber
- Relatives: Robert Milligan McLane (uncle)

Robert Milligan McLane (November 30, 1867 – May 30, 1904) was the 34th Mayor of Baltimore, serving from May 19, 1903, to his death on May 30, 1904. He is known for his role in the Great Baltimore Fire, and for his sudden death in office.

== Early life ==
Robert McLane was born in Baltimore, the son of James Latimer and Fanny (King) McLane. He was the nephew of Robert Milligan McLane. He graduated from Johns Hopkins University in 1886, and subsequently attended the University of Maryland School of Law.

On May 14, 1904, he married Mrs. Mary (Lusby) Van Bibber, a widow several years his senior. She had been previously married to Dr. John Pierre Van Bibber, a Baltimore physician who had died in 1892.

== Political career ==
In 1903, McLane was elected Mayor of Baltimore; he was 35, and the city's youngest mayor. His actions in office included the appointment of William Cabell Bruce to the position of city solicitor, and, far more controversially, the management of the Great Baltimore Fire in February 1904: during the fire, McLane "stood in the streets (...) cheering on the firefighters", which historian and professor of management Pete Petersen has described as "the macho thing to do", but "not the smartest", since it meant that McLane was incommunicado, and could not accept offers of aid from other cities. In the fire's aftermath, McLane told The Baltimore News that although he was "gratified at the sympathy and the offers of practical assistance" from across the United States, "Baltimore [would] take care of its own people the best it can"; all donations were returned.

== Death ==
On May 30, 1904, McLane was found in his home, dying of a gunshot wound to the head. He had been in office 385 days. He was buried in Green Mount Cemetery.

McLane's death was ruled suicide. Those who knew him had differing opinions as to this verdict, with some emphasizing the stress that he had faced as a result of the post-fire reconstruction. In 2004, researchers from The Baltimore Sun pointed out that McLane had gotten married two weeks before his death, which could have alleviated his stress, but that his family had refused to attend the wedding because his wife was 12 years older than he and from the wrong social class ("the smart set" as opposed to "the retiring aristocratic sort"), which could have exacerbated it. They also pointed out that McLane left no suicide note, and that he had written a letter earlier that day describing his plans for the following week. In 1986, The Baltimore Sun columnist Theo Lippman, Jr. cited a 1956 letter to the editor which claimed that "many of us feel confident that we know that [McLane] was murdered and also who the murderer was and also the motive for that crime", but which did not provide further details.

By 1914, the intersection of Baltimore Street and Liberty Street had been renamed McLane Place in his honor; however, this name was subsequently abandoned.
