= Aloysius Leo Knott =

American politician (1829–1918)

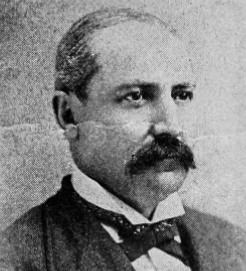
- Knott in 1917 publication

Member of the Maryland House of Delegates from the Baltimore's 2nd district
- In office 1900–1901 Serving with Francis P. Curtis, William Duncan, Ferdinand Claiborne Latrobe, Martin Lehmayer, John L. Sanford
- In office 1867–1867 Serving with John G. Hooper, Stephen G. Israel, Frederick A. Kraft, Henry S. Langford, Francis P. Stevens

Personal details
- Born: May 12, 1829 near New Market, Frederick County, Maryland, U.S.
- Died: April 18, 1918 (aged 88) Baltimore, Maryland, U.S.
- Resting place: New Cathedral Cemetery; Baltimore, Maryland, U.S.
- Party: Democratic
- Spouse: Regina M. Kenan (m. 1873)
- Relatives: Edward Digges; Dudley Digges
- Education: St. Mary's College (AB, AM)
- Occupation: Politician; educator; lawyer; writer

Aloysius Leo Knott (May 12, 1829 – April 18, 1918) was an American politician, lawyer and educator from Maryland. He served as a member of the Maryland House of Delegates, representing Baltimore's 2nd District in 1867 and from 1900 to 1901.

== Early life ==
Aloysius Leo Knott was born on May 12, 1829, near New Market in Frederick County, Maryland, to Elizabeth Sprigg (née Sweeney) and Edward Knott. His father was a farmer and planter and served in the War of 1812. He was descended from James Knott, an early settler of Charles County. He was also descended from Virginia governor Edward Digges and his father, Dudley Digges. Knott studied at St. John's Literary Institute in Frederick for a year. His family moved to Baltimore and Knott then attended St. Mary's College. He graduated from there with a Bachelor of Arts and Master of Arts.

After graduation, Knott became an assistant principal at Cumberland Academy. He was in charge of classes in Greek, mathematics and surveying. He then returned to Baltimore and studied law in the office of William Schley. At that time, he then taught at St. Mary's College the subjects of algebra and Greek. Knott then founded and became master of the Howard Latin School in Howard County. He served as master for two years. He returned again to Baltimore, finished his law studies and was admitted to the bar.

== Career ==
Knott formed a law partnership with James H. Bevans for two years before practicing law alone. He later served as state's attorney of Baltimore from 1867 to 1879.

In 1859, Knott was part of the Reform Party that challenged the Know Nothings in Baltimore. Knott was supportive of Stephen A. Douglas in the 1860 election. Knott was a delegate to the 1864 Democratic National Convention. Knott was nominated for the U.S. Congress. Knott was a Democrat. He served as a member of the Maryland House of Delegates, representing Baltimore's 2nd District in 1867. He was also a delegate to the 1872 and 1900 Democratic National Conventions.

In 1883, Knott was nominated as judge in Baltimore, but he ultimately withdrew after receiving political pressure from Baltimore mayor William Pinkney Whyte's administration. In 1885, president Grover Cleveland appointed Knott as second assistant Postmaster General. He served in that role from April 1, 1885. In December 1886, governor Henry Lloyd offered Knott an appointment as judge. Knott declined after speaking with president Cleveland. He left his role in the Postmaster General's office in 1889. He then resumed practicing law.

Following the second term of Cleveland, Knott met with Cleveland and learned that Baltimore political boss Arthur Pue Gorman suggested that Cleveland shouldn't appoint Knott to any role. Knott posted a refutation against Gorman in The Baltimore Sun. Knott went on to serve again in the Maryland House of Delegates, representing Baltimore's 2nd District from 1900 to 1901.

In 1900, Knott was selected as professor of elementary law and constitutional law at the Baltimore University Law School. In 1904, he became professor of international law. In 1905, he became the dean of the law school. His office in the Calvert Building and his library of law books were lost in the Great Baltimore Fire of 1904. In 1907, he retired from practicing law.

On October 12, 1892, Knott spoke at the unveiling of the statue of Christopher Columbus at Druid Hill Park. Knott was a member of the Maryland Historical Society, Maryland Club, Society of the War of 1812, Society of Colonial Wars in the State of Maryland and president of the Maryland Original Research Society. He wrote The History of the Redemption of the State about the political revolution in Maryland between 1866 and 1867. He also wrote History of Maryland, which was published in Encyclopedia Americana.

== Personal life ==
Knott married Regina M. Kenan in 1873. His wife died in 1911. Knott was a Catholic. He was a personal friend and advisor of Grover Cleveland.

Knott died from pneumonia following a cold on April 18, 1918, at the age of 88, at his apartment at Stafford Hotel in Baltimore. He was buried at New Cathedral Cemetery.
