= William Steuart (mayor of Baltimore) =

American mayor (1780–1839)

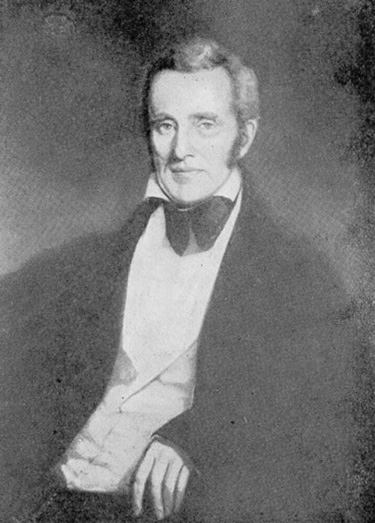

7th Mayor of Baltimore
- In office 1831–1832
- Preceded by: Jacob Small
- Succeeded by: Jesse Hunt

Lieutenant colonel, United States Army

Personal details
- Born: c. 1780 Baltimore, Maryland, U.S.
- Died: February 12, 1839 (aged 58–59) Baltimore, Maryland, U.S.
- Occupation: Politician; soldier

William Steuart (1780 – February 12, 1839) was a stone mason in colonial Maryland, and Mayor of Baltimore from 1831 to 1832. He was a lieutenant colonel in the United States Army during the War of 1812, and saw service during the Battle of Baltimore, where he commanded the 38th United States Infantry foot regiment.

== Personal life ==
Steuart was born in 1780 in Baltimore, Maryland to Robert Steuart. He was brought up as a stonemason by his father and his uncle Hugh and became a Freemason, joining Concordia Lodge No. 13. He married Elizabeth Hagerty of Alexandria, Virginia and had five sons and two daughters.

=== War of 1812 ===
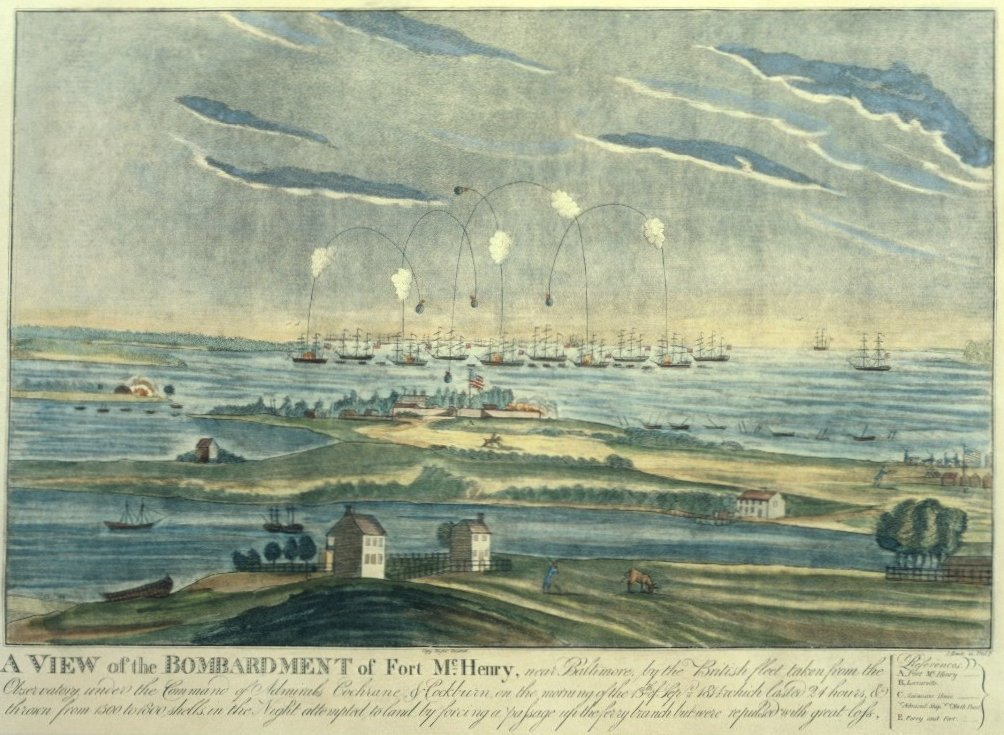
Steuart served as Lieutenant Colonel of the 38th United States Infantry foot regiment during the Battle of Baltimore

During the War of 1812 Steuart served in the United States Army as Lieutenant Colonel of the 38th United States Infantry foot regiment, commanding a force of around 600 men. Steuart was present at the Battle of Baltimore, during which the American forces prevailed against the British bombardment of Fort McHenry, with Steuart's regiment "occupying the exposed and shelterless position beyond the outer ditch."

=== Politics and business ===
After the War of 1812, Steuart was elected as a delegate to the Maryland Assembly, and later became Mayor of Baltimore from 1831 to 1832. Steuart was Mayor of Baltimore for one term only, serving during the unexpired term of Mayor Jacob Small, who resigned his office on March 31, 1831

Steuart was a building contractor and he prepared the stone work for the Washington Monument (Baltimore). In addition he worked on the Court House erected in 1805 (since demolished), and other large buildings of the time.

He also held a number of other civil offices in State and City government, in addition to being a member of the Vigilant Fire Company. He was appointed to the office of City Collector a few days before his death.

== See also ==
- Colonial families of Maryland
- List of mayors of Baltimore, Maryland
- Province of Maryland

== Notes ==
Preceded by Jacob Small	Mayor of Baltimore; 1831–1832	Succeeded by Jesse Hunt
