= Whitfield Winsey =

African American doctor (1847–1919)

Whitfield Winsey (September 1847 – July 6, 1919), was the first African American doctor admitted to the Medical and Chirurgical Faculty of Maryland.

== Early life ==
Winsey was born to William H. and Malvina Gibbs Winsey of Baltimore. The Winseys were a free African American family and William Winsey earned enough money as a brickmaker to provide a private education for his son, Whitfield.

Beginning in 1867, Winsey was mentored by Dr. John Richard Woodcock Dunbar, who was vice-president of the Medical and Chirurgical Faculty of Maryland and was influential in the medical community. In 1871, Winsey graduated from Harvard Medical School, where he was taught by Oliver Wendell Holmes, Sr.

== Career ==
After medical school, Winsey returned to East Baltimore and establish a medical practice in his home. On April 2, 1882, Winsey was admitted to the Medical and Chirurgical Faculty of Maryland, becoming the first African American to do so. Four doctors resigned from the faculty in protest. Earlier in the year, he was denied admittance to the Baltimore Medical and Surgical Society, as some members objected to Winsey's admittance, one in particular stating that "his Southern birth prevented him from recognizing a negro practitioner."

In addition to private practice, Winsey was an instructor at Provident Hospital and a physician at the Industrial Home for Colored Girls at Melvale in Baltimore.

== Personal life ==
On November 2, 1872, Winsey married Anastasia Jakes. They had two children, Herbert who was born in 1875 and Bertha who was born in 1878. Winsey died on July 6, 1919, at the age of 71.
