= John Montgomery (Maryland politician) =

American politician (1764–1828)

5th Mayor of Baltimore
- In office 1824–1826
- Preceded by: Edward Johnson
- Succeeded by: Jacob Small
- In office 1820–1822
- Preceded by: Edward Johnson
- Succeeded by: Edward Johnson

Attorney General of Maryland
- In office April 29, 1811 – February 11, 1818
- Governor: vacant Levin Winder; Charles Carnan Ridgely
- Preceded by: John Johnson Sr.
- Succeeded by: Luther Martin

Member of the U.S. House of Representatives from Maryland's 6th district
- In office March 4, 1807 – April 29, 1811
- Preceded by: John Archer
- Succeeded by: Stevenson Archer

Member of the Maryland House of Delegates
- In office 1793–1798

State's Attorney of Harford County, Maryland
- In office 1793–1796

Personal details
- Born: 1764 Carlisle, Province of Pennsylvania, British America
- Died: July 17, 1828 (aged 63–64) Baltimore, Maryland, U.S.
- Resting place: Methodist Episcopal Church; Bel Air, Maryland, U.S.
- Party: Democratic-Republican
- Spouse(s): Mary Hanes; Maria Nicholson
- Relations: William Few (brother-in-law); Albert Gallatin (brother-in-law); Joshua Seney (brother-in-law)
- Parent: John Montgomery

John Montgomery (1764 – July 17, 1828) was an American lawyer from Baltimore, Maryland. He represented the sixth district of Maryland in the U.S. Congress from 1807 until 1811. He served as the Attorney General of Maryland from 1811 to 1818 and Mayor of Baltimore from 1820 to 1822 and 1824 to 1826.

== Early life ==
Montgomery was born in Carlisle in the Province of Pennsylvania in 1764. He was the son of John Montgomery, a member of the Continental Congress during the American Revolution.

Montgomery was educated in Carlisle, studied law, was admitted to the bar in 1791 and moved to Harford County, Maryland to begin a practice.

== Career ==
A Democratic-Republican, Montgomery served in the Maryland House of Delegates from 1793 to 1798. From 1793 to 1796 he was Harford County's State's Attorney.

In 1806, Montgomery was a successful candidate for Congress. He won reelection in 1808 and 1810, and served in the 10th, 11th, and 12th Congresses, holding office from March 4, 1807 until he resigned on April 29, 1811.

Montgomery resigned from Congress and relocated to Baltimore in order to accept appointment as Attorney General of Maryland. He served from April 29, 1811 to February 11, 1818.

During the War of 1812 Montgomery was appointed a captain in the militia and commanded the Baltimore Union Artillery, and he took part in the Battle of North Point.

Montgomery served again in the House of Delegates in 1819. He was Mayor of Baltimore from 1820 to 1822 and again in 1824 to 1826.

== Personal life ==
Montgomery was married first to Mary Hanes or Harris, also called Polly. In 1809, he married Maria Nicholson (1775–1868). Maria was the daughter of Commodore James Nicholson and was the sister of Catherine "Kitty" Nicholson (wife of William Few), Hannah Nicholson (wife of Albert Gallatin), Frances "Fanny" Nicholson (husband of Joshua Seney), James Witter Nicholson (husband of Ann Griffin, daughter of Isaac Griffin), and Jehoiadden Nicholson (wife of James Chrystie). His children included sons John and James Nicholson Montgomery.

He died in Baltimore on July 17, 1828. He was buried in the cemetery of the Methodist Episcopal Church in the Bel Air hamlet of Emmorton. This cemetery is also known as Mount Carmel Cemetery, Bel Air Methodist Episcopal Church Cemetery, and Mount Carmel Methodist Church Cemetery.

U.S. House of Representatives
Preceded by John Archer	U.S. Congressman, Maryland's 6th District; 1807–1811	Succeeded by Stevenson Archer
Legal offices
Preceded by John Johnson Sr.	Attorney General of Maryland; 1811–1818	Succeeded by Luther Martin
Political offices
Preceded by Edward Johnson	Mayor of Baltimore; 1820–1822	Succeeded by Edward Johnson
Preceded by Edward Johnson	Mayor of Baltimore; 1824–1826	Succeeded by Jacob Small
