= Thorowgood Smith =

American mayor (1744–1810)

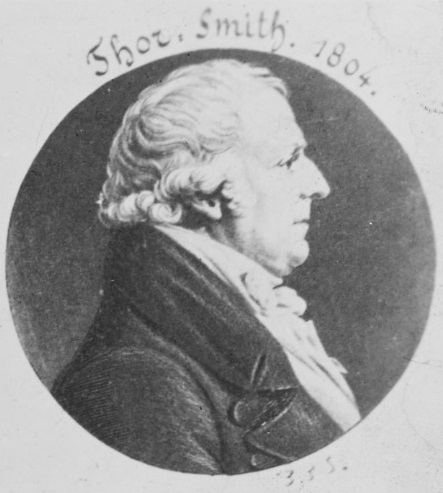

2nd Mayor of Baltimore
- In office 1804–1808
- Preceded by: James Calhoun
- Succeeded by: Edward Johnson

Personal details
- Born: 1744 Accomac County, Province of Virginia, British America
- Died: August 13, 1810 (aged 65–66)
- Party: None

Thorowgood Smith (1744 in Accomac County, Virginia – August 13, 1810) was the second mayor of Baltimore from 1804 to 1808. He was appointed to that position when his predecessor James Calhoun resigned. He served for 4 years. He reformed the police system, and ordered the building of the plumbing system by the Baltimore water company. Smith was well respected throughout the region. He died in 1810.
