= Ferdinand Claiborne Latrobe =

American politician (1833–1911)

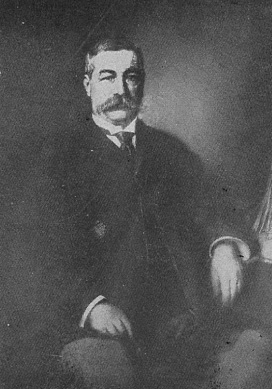

26th Mayor of Baltimore
- In office 1891–1895
- Preceded by: Robert C. Davidson
- Succeeded by: Alcaeus Hooper
- In office 1887–1889
- Preceded by: James Hodges
- Succeeded by: Robert C. Davidson
- In office 1883–1885
- Preceded by: William Pinkney Whyte
- Succeeded by: James Hodges
- In office 1878–1881
- Preceded by: George Proctor Kane
- Succeeded by: William Pinkney Whyte
- In office 1875–1877
- Preceded by: Joshua Van Sant
- Succeeded by: George Proctor Kane

Member of the Maryland House of Delegates
- In office 1900–1901 Serving with Francis P. Curtis, William Duncan, Aloysius Leo Knott, Martin Lehmayer, John L. Sanford
- In office 1868–1872 Serving with George Colton, George A. Kirk, James L. McLane, John F. Wiley, Greenbury Wilson, G. Morris Bond, Michael A. Mullin, James Pentland, H. Tillard Smith

Personal details
- Born: October 14, 1833 Baltimore, Maryland, U.S.
- Died: January 13, 1911 (aged 77) Baltimore, Maryland, U.S.
- Resting place: Green Mount Cemetery; Baltimore, Maryland, U.S.
- Spouses: Louisa Sherlock Swann (m. 1860; died 1865) Ellen Penrose Swann (m. 1880)
- Relations: Benjamin H. Latrobe (grandfather); Ferdinand Leigh Claiborne (grandfather); William C. C. Claiborne (great uncle)
- Children: 4
- Parent: John H. B. Latrobe (father)
- Education: College of St. James
- Occupation: Politician; lawyer
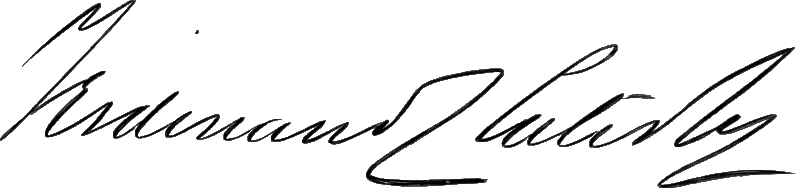
- Signature

Ferdinand Claiborne Latrobe (October 14, 1833 – January 13, 1911) was a seven-term Mayor of Baltimore, a member of the Maryland House of Delegates, and an attorney during the 19th century.

== Early life ==
Latrobe was born on October 14, 1833, at a house on South Gay Street in Baltimore. He was the son of patent lawyer and Latrobe stove ("Baltimore Heater") inventor John H. B. Latrobe and Virginia Charlotte Claiborne, as well as the grandson of the American architect and engineer Benjamin Henry Latrobe. In his mother's line, he was the grandson of General Ferdinand Leigh Claiborne and the great-nephew of William C. C. Claiborne, Governor of Mississippi, the Louisiana Territory, and the State of Louisiana. He was named after his grandfather, Ferdinand Claiborne.

Latrobe was educated at the College of St. James in Washington County, Maryland. Latrobe worked as a clerk in a mercantile house in Baltimore and as counsel for the Baltimore and Ohio Railroad in 1858. He then studied law with his father and was admitted to the bar in Maryland in 1859.

== Career ==
In 1860, Latrobe was appointed judge-advocate-general by then Governor of Maryland, Thomas H. Hicks and assisted in reorganizing the Maryland state militia under the Act of 1868, which he authored.

He was elected to the Maryland House of Delegates in 1867, serving from 1868 to 1872 representing Baltimore's 2nd district, and was Speaker of the House in 1870. While serving in the House he held the position of Chairman of the Ways and Means Committee. In 1871, Latrobe became counsel for the Baltimore and Ohio Railroad. He would serve again as counsel for the railroad in 1885 and 1887 between his periods of political office.

=== Mayor of Baltimore ===
In 1875, he was elected Mayor of Baltimore and served until 1877. The same year, Latrobe and then Maryland Governor John Lee Carroll, were present throughout strikes and outbreaks of violence during the Baltimore railroad strike of 1877 that erupted as part of the Great Railroad Strike of 1877.

He served out the unexpired term of George Proctor Kane. He was reelected in 1879 and served two more terms until 1881. In 1883 he was again elected mayor, serving until 1885. During this latter term, a seven-mile tunnel was built to direct water from the Gunpowder River to Baltimore.

He was again elected mayor, serving from 1887 until 1889, and served a final two mayoral terms from 1891 until 1895. He was elected again to the Maryland House of Delegates, representing Baltimore's 2nd district, from 1900 to 1901. He served as speaker of the House of Delegates in 1901.

Latrobe served as president of the Consolidated Gas Company from 1901 to 1910.

A 1993 survey of historians, political scientists and urban experts conducted by Melvin G. Holli of the University of Illinois at Chicago ranked Latrobe as the twenty-seventh-best American big-city mayor to have served between the years 1820 and 1993.

== Personal life ==
In 1861, Latrobe married Louisa Sherlock Swann, daughter of Thomas Swann, who was formerly Mayor of Baltimore and Governor of Maryland. They had one son, Swann. The child died before reaching manhood. His wife died in 1865. Latrobe married Ellen Penrose Swann, the widow of Thomas Swann, Jr., in 1880 and together they had three children: Ferdinande Charlotte (b. 1881), Ellen Virginia (b. 1883), and Ferdinand Claiborne Latrobe, Jr. (1889–1944).

Latrobe died on January 13, 1911, at his home at 904 North Charles Street in Baltimore. He had a Masonic funeral that was commanded by Grand Master Thomas J. Shryock. He was buried at Green Mount Cemetery in Baltimore.

== Quotes ==
- "We have always had the most beautiful women and the finest oysters in the world, and now we have the best baseball club." (speaking of the first, short-lived incarnation of the Baltimore Orioles, in 1894)

Preceded by William A. Stewart	Speaker of the Maryland House of Delegates; 1870	Succeeded by Arthur Pue Gorman
Preceded by Joshua Van Sant	Mayor of Baltimore; 1875–1877	Succeeded by George Proctor Kane
Preceded by George Proctor Kane	Mayor of Baltimore; 1878–1881	Succeeded by William Pinkney Whyte
Preceded by William Pinkney Whyte	Mayor of Baltimore; 1883–1885	Succeeded by James Hodges
Preceded by James Hodges	Mayor of Baltimore; 1887–1889	Succeeded by Robert C. Davidson
Preceded by Robert C. Davidson	Mayor of Baltimore; 1891–1895	Succeeded by Alcaeus Hooper
Preceded by Lloyd Wilkinson	Speaker of the Maryland House of Delegates; 1901	Succeeded by Noble L. Mitchell
