= Jacob Small =

American politician (died 1851)

6th Mayor of Baltimore
- In office 1826–1831
- Preceded by: John Montgomery
- Succeeded by: William Steuart

Personal details
- Born: 1772
- Died: 1851 Maryland, U.S.
- Occupation: Architect

Jacob Small (1772–1851) was an American politician who served as the sixth mayor of Baltimore from 1826 to 1831, when he resigned from office. He designed the Ellicott City Station of the Baltimore and Ohio Railroad (B&O), finished in 1831. It is the oldest surviving railway station in the United States, as well as being one of the oldest in the world.

== Career ==
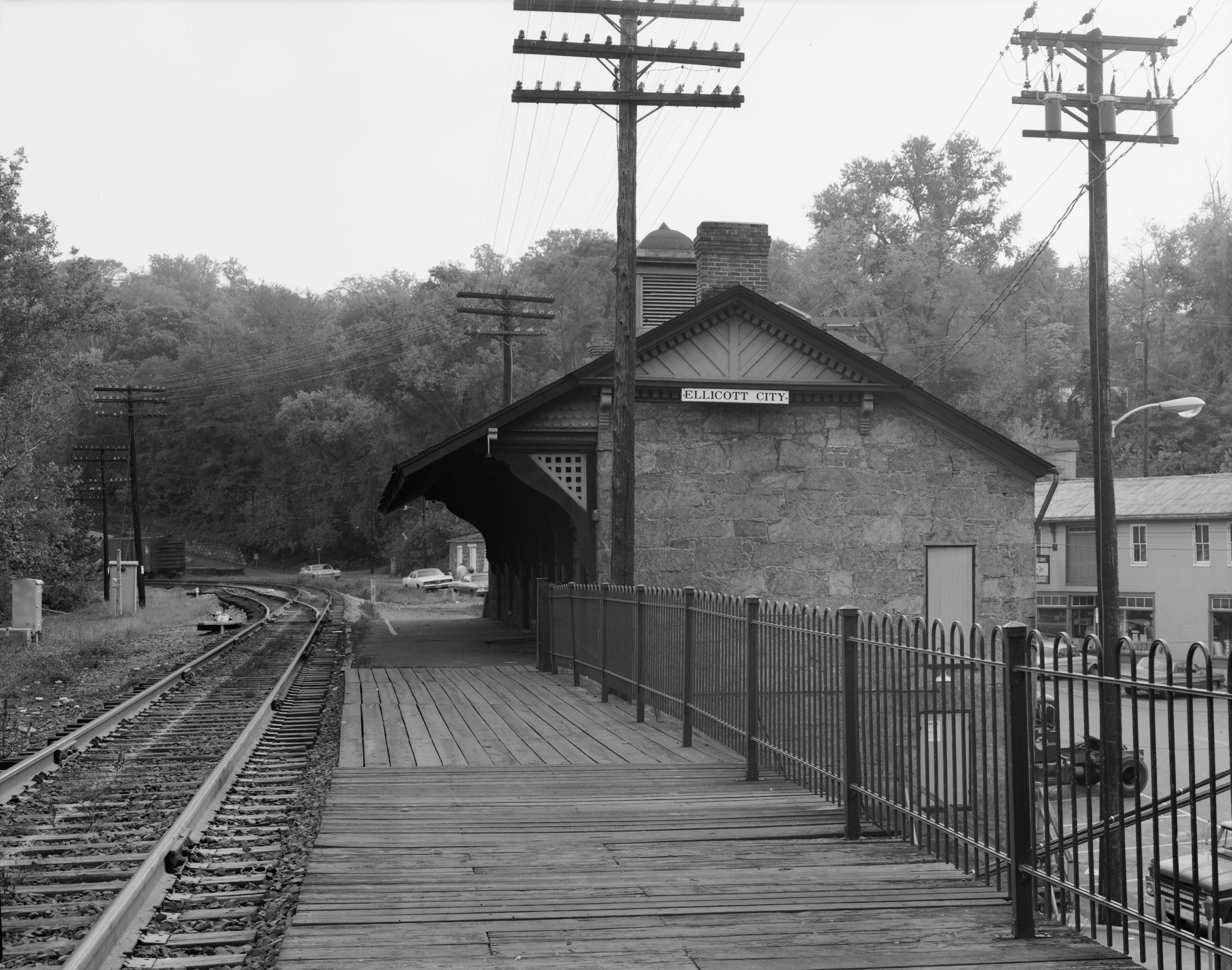
Ellicott City Station, designed by Small

Small was a veteran of the War of 1812 who served under General Samuel Smith.

Jacob Small was the mayor of Baltimore on a number of occasions: from 1826 to 1828; 1828 to 1830; and finally from 1830 to March 31, 1831, when he resigned his post. Among his accomplishments as Mayor were the introduction of garbage collection, and the completion of the Washington Monument (Baltimore). He left office in order to pursue other business interests. William Steuart was elected to serve the unexpired part of Small's final term, which ended in 1832.

He was also a skilled joiner and builder. He designed the B&O Ellicott City Station, finished in 1831, and the oldest surviving railway station in the United States (as well as being one of the oldest in the world). The building was declared a National Historic Landmark in 1968. It is Small's only surviving piece of architecture.

== Death and legacy ==
In 1851, when Small died, he received a brief obituary in The Baltimore Sun: "Colonel Jacob Small, formerly one of the most efficient mayors Baltimore ever had, died at his residence in this city on Friday. His remains were yesterday attended to their narrow home by the Masonic fraternity."

Small is buried in Old St Paul's Cemetery in Baltimore, near the junction of Lombard Street and Martin Luther King Jr. Boulevard.

== Notes ==
Preceded by John Montgomery (Maryland politician)	Mayor of Baltimore; 1831–1832	Succeeded by William Steuart (Mayor of Baltimore)
