= Baltimore City Fire Department =

Fire department in the United States

Baltimore City Fire Department (BCFD)
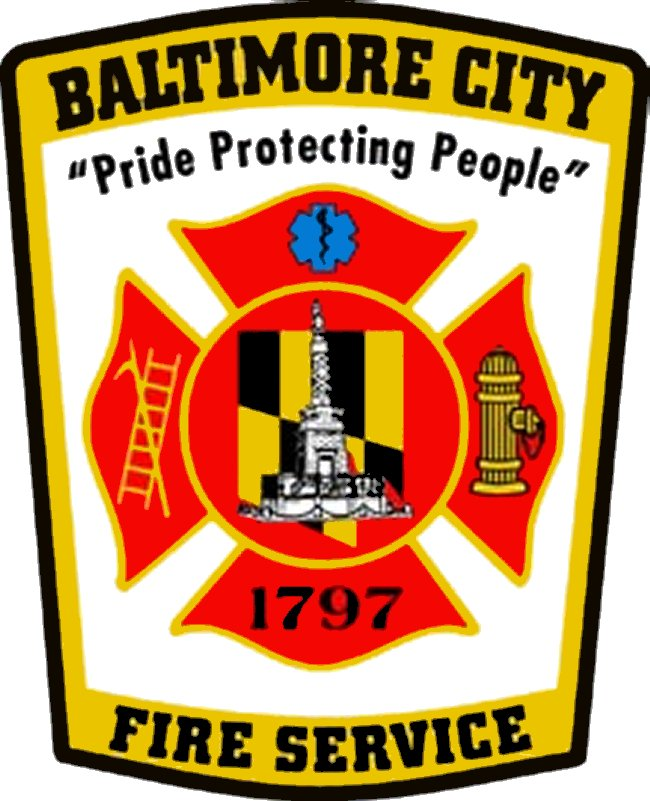

Operational area
- Country: United States
- State: Maryland
- City: Baltimore

Agency overview
- Established: 1859 (founded 1797)
- Annual calls: ~235,000
- Employees: 1,800
- Annual budget: $155,002,404 (2016)
- Staffing: Career
- Fire chief: Chief James W. Wallace
- EMS level: Advanced Life Support (ALS) & Basic Life Support (BLS)
- IAFF: 734 (firefighters) 964 (officers)
- Motto: "Pride Protecting People"

Facilities and equipment
- Battalions: 7
- Stations: 38
- Engines: 32
- Trucks: 17
- Squads: 3
- Rescues: 1
- Ambulances: 30
- HAZMAT: 2
- Fireboats: 2
- Light and air: 2

Website
- Official website
- IAFF website

The Baltimore City Fire Department (BCFD) provides fire protection and emergency medical services to the city of Baltimore, Maryland, United States. Founded in 1797 and established in 1859, the Baltimore City Fire Department covers an area of 81 square miles (210 km^{2}) of land and 11 square miles (28 km^{2}) of water, with a resident population of over 640,000 and a daytime population of over 1,000,000. The BCFD responds to approximately 235,000 emergency calls annually. There are two International Association of Fire Fighters (IAFF) locals; IAFF 734 for firefighters and IAFF 964 for officers.

== History ==
Baltimore's early firefighting was performed by volunteers. The various companies engaged in serious rivalries, resulting in what a Baltimore mayor termed "irregularities". For example, gangs operating out of firehouses participated in the Baltimore Know-Nothing riots of 1856. A municipal organization was established in 1859.

The Great Baltimore Fire in 1904 burned for 30 hours straight and decimated a major part of central Baltimore, including over 1,500 buildings. Mutual aid companies from as far away as Washington D.C., Philadelphia and New York City were called in to assist. The fire led to uniform national standards in fire fighting equipment and protocols. As with other large fires of the time, it was a predecessor to the stringent fire codes of today.

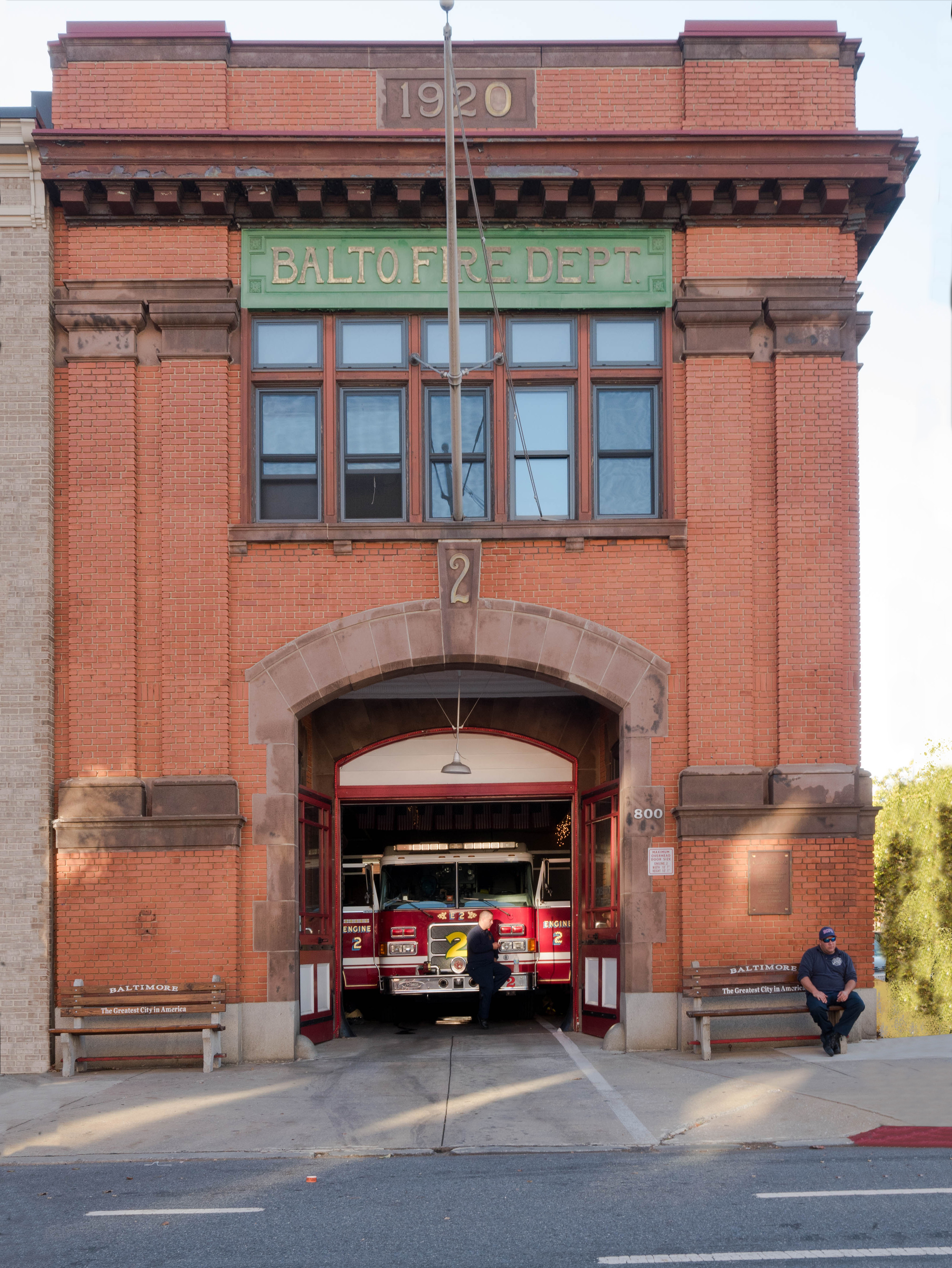
Engine Company 2, 800 Light Street, October 2015

== In popular culture ==
The movie Ladder 49 portrays the BCFD, with a fictional truck company (referred to as a ladder company in the film). Members of the BCFD served as advisors for the film.

== Frequencies ==
The Baltimore City Fire Department operates on a 800mhz APCO-25 Phase 1 digital system. This is a list of simulcast VHF frequencies to program into a scanner or radio to listen to BCFD radio communication:

All frequencies in MHz
Channel	Frequency	Use
1	154.310	VHF backup
3	154.385	Fireground 1, 2, 3 or 4 simulcast (only simulcasts the most recent ongoing incident)
5	154.415	A2 dispatch simulcast
6	154.145	A1 main simulcast

== Baltimore civil unrest of 2015 ==
During the civil unrest in Baltimore that took place from April 27, 2015 to April 28, the Baltimore Fire Department was backed up with multiple calls and also battled against rioters. Many fire trucks were damaged by rioters; bottles and rocks were thrown at the trucks as they were responding to incidents. In one case there is also video footage of a citizen cutting a fire truck's fire hose in an effort to hinder its effectiveness. The Baltimore Fire Department responded to 144 vehicle fires and 15 structure fires during the course of the unrest. Many surrounding areas such as Howard County Fire & Rescue, Anne Arundel County Fire Department and Prince George's County Fire Department sent crews to Baltimore to help the Baltimore Fire Department during the riots.

== Fire and rescue stations and apparatus ==
Station	Location	Battalion	Fire units		EMS units		Other units
Station	Location	Battalion	Engine	Truck	Rescue Squad	Ambulance	Other units
Roman A. Kaminski Fire Station	2120 Eastern Ave., 21231	First	E5	T3		M10	
	520 S. Conkling St., 21224	First	E41				BC1
	1601 Broening Hwy, 21224	First	E50			M2	EMS 1
	5714 Eastern Ave, 21224	First		T20		A20	Critical Alert 42
	645 N. Highland St, 21205	First	E51				
	4315 Mannasota Ave, 21206	First	E27	T26			
Thomas J. Burke Fire Station	1100 Hillen St, 21202	Second	E6	T1		M7	BC2, SO2, AirFlex 2, Shift Commander, Mobile Communications Unit
Smokestack Hardy Fire Station	405 McMechen St, 21217	Second	E13	T16		M4	
	3123 Greenmount Ave, 21218	Second	E31			A3	
Herman Williams Jr. Fire Station	805 E. 25th St, 21218	Second	E33	T5		M16	EMS 2
	800 Light St, 21230	Second	E2				
	1503 W. LaFayette Ave, 21217	Third	E8	T10		M15	BC3
	1908 Hollins St, 21223	Third	E14				
	3220 Frederick Ave, 21229	Third	E30	T8		M12	
Charles R. Thomas Fire Station	2249 Edmondson Ave, 21223	Third	E36				EMS 3
	2608 Washington Blvd, 21230	Third	E47				
	608 Swann Ave, 21229	Third	E53				
	1229 Bush St, 21230	Third	E55	T23			Critical Alert 43
	3724 Roland Ave, 21211	Fourth	E21	T25			Critical Alert 44
	4522 Harford Rd, 21214	Fourth	E42			M6, A30	
	1100 Walters Ave, 21239	Fourth	E43			M18	BC4, EMS 4
	2 Upland Rd, 21210	Fourth	E44			A19	
	5821 Belair Rd, 21206	Fourth		T30	Squad 54		
	6512 Harford Rd, 21214	Fourth	E56				
Walbrook Station	3130 W. North Ave, 21216	Fifth	E20	T18		A8	
	3906 Liberty Heights Ave, 21207	Fifth		T12	Squad 40		BC5
	2700 Glen Ave, 21215	Fifth	E45	T27		M14	
	5500 Reisterstown Rd, 21215	Fifth	E46				EMS 5
Hilton L. Roberts Sr. Fire Station	3525 Woodbrook Ave, 21217	Fifth	E52				
John F. Steadman Memorial Station	15 S. Eutaw St, 21201	Sixth	E23		Rescue 1	M1, A23	BC6, EMS 6, AirFlex 1, Hazmat 1, Decon 1
	1001 E. Fort Ave, 21230	Sixth	E26	T6		M5	BC EMS, Critical Alert 66
	430 Maude Ave, 21225	Sixth	E35	T21		M9	
	4427 Pennington Ave, 21226	Sixth	E57				
	2425 Annapolis Rd, 21230	Sixth	E58				
	2609 Leahy St, 21230	Sixth					Fire Boat 1, Fire Rescue Boat 1
