= Robert Ross (British Army officer, born 1766) =

British Army officer (1766-1814)

Major-General Robert Ross
- Born: 1766; Rostrevor, County Down
- Died: 12 September 1814 (aged 47–48); Near Baltimore, Maryland
- Burial place: Old Burying Ground, Halifax
- Education: Trinity College, Dublin
- Military career
- Allegiance: Great Britain; United Kingdom
- Branch: British Army
- Service years: 1789–1814
- Rank: Major general
- Conflicts: French Revolutionary Wars; Anglo-Russian invasion of Holland; French campaign in Egypt and Syria; Napoleonic Wars; Battle of Maida; Battle of Corunna; Walcheren Campaign; Peninsular War; War of 1812; Battle of Bladensburg; Burning of Washington; Battle of Baltimore; Battle of North Point †

Major-General Robert Ross (1766 – 12 September 1814) was a British Army officer who served in the French Revolutionary and Napoleonic Wars and the War of 1812. Ross joined the British army in 1789. He served as an officer in several battles during the Napoleonic Wars, including the battles of Maida and Corunna, gaining promotion to colonel. In 1809, he was sent to serve in the Peninsular War, including the Battles of Vittoria, Roncesvalles, Sorauren, and Orthez. He was wounded in the neck at the Battle of Orthez in France on 27 February 1814.

Upon returning to duty later that year, Ross was made a major general and sent to North America, as commander of "all British forces on the East Coast". In August 1814, he reached Benedict, Maryland and continued on, leading the professional soldiers who quickly defeated a poorly organized American militia at the Battle of Bladensburg on 24 August; that evening, he led his troops into Washington D.C. During his command of the Burning of Washington many important U.S. government buildings, including the White House and the Capitol were damaged, demoralizing and greatly damaging the American war effort. Ross then led a British invasion north up the Chesapeake Bay towards the city of Baltimore which culminated in the Battle of Baltimore that September. On 12 September, he was shot while commanding troops at North Point, and died while being moved to the rear.

== Early life ==
Ross was born in Rostrevor, County Down, Ireland, to Major David Ross, an officer in the Seven Years' War and his wife, Elizabeth Adderley, the maternal half-sister of James Caulfeild, 1st Earl of Charlemont. He was educated at Trinity College Dublin in Ireland, where he was a treasurer of the College Historical Society and joined the 25th Regiment of Foot as an ensign in 1789.

== French Revolutionary and Napoleonic Wars ==
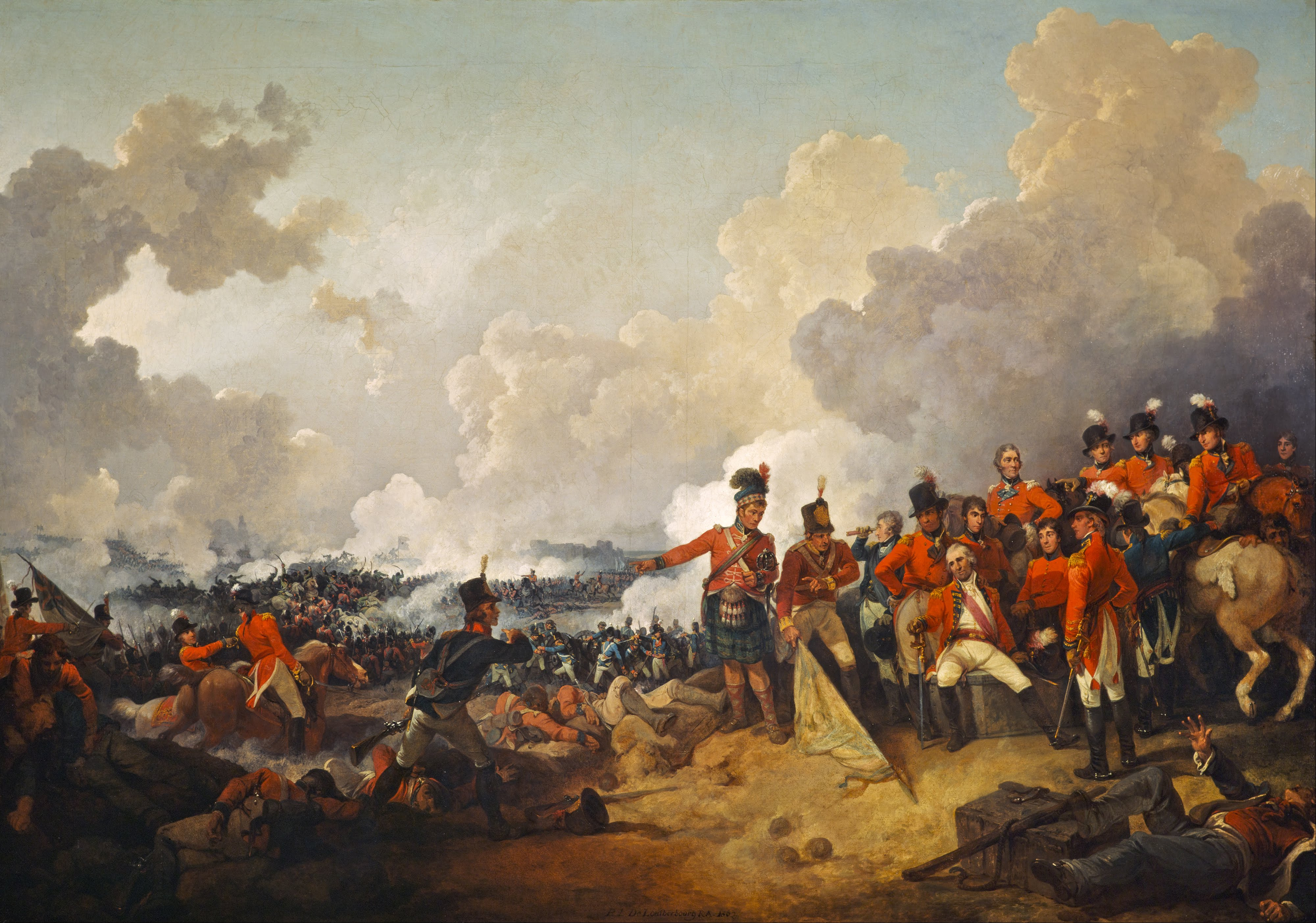
The Battle of Alexandria, which Ross fought in

Ross fought as a junior officer at the battles of Krabbendam in the Netherlands in 1799 and the Battle of Alexandria in Egypt in 1801. In 1803, he was promoted to major and given command of the 20th Regiment of Foot. He next fought at the Battle of Maida in the Kingdom of Naples in 1806. He was promoted to lieutenant–colonel at the end of 1808 and fought in the Battle of Corunna in Spain in early 1809 during the Peninsular War. In 1810, Ross was made a full colonel as well as aide-de-camp to the King. In 1813, Ross was sent to serve under Arthur Wellesley and commanded his regiment at the battles of Vittoria, Roncesvalles, and Sorauren that year. He was seriously wounded in the left side of his neck at the Battle of Orthez, on 27 February 1814, and had just returned to service when he was given command of an expeditionary force to attack the United States.

== War of 1812 ==
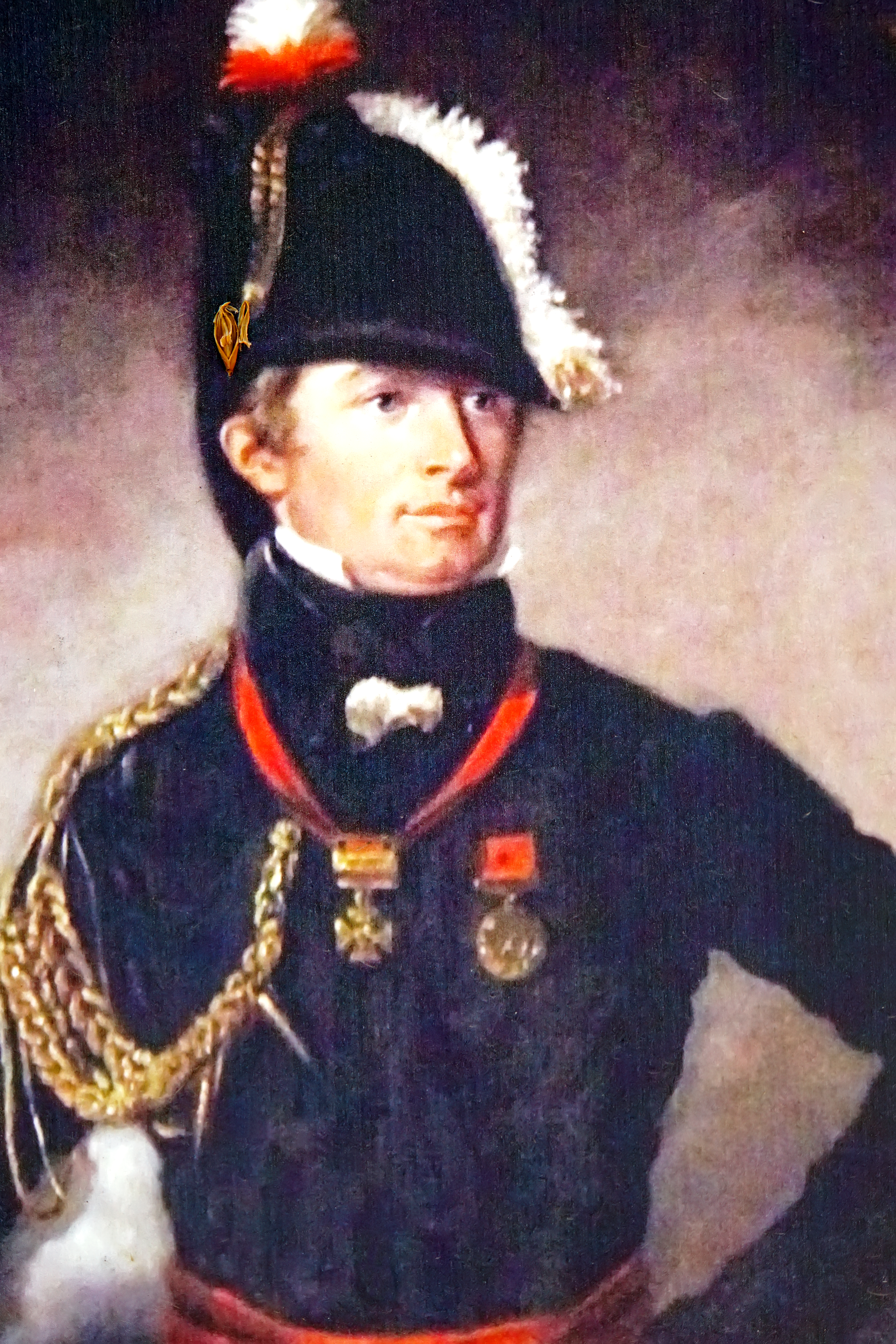
Portrait of Ross at the White House, by Dennis Jarvis

Ross sailed to North America as a major general to take charge of all British troops off the east coast of the United States. He personally led the British troops ashore in Benedict, Maryland, and marched through Upper Marlboro, Maryland, to the attack on the Americans at the Battle of Bladensburg on 24 August 1814, routing the hastily organised militia units that opposed him. Author Steve Vogel credits Ross' strategy for the success at Bladensburg: "He conducted a brilliant campaign of deception, feinting one way or the other, marching and then doubling back, and was able to paralyze the Americans and prevent them from defending Bladensburg".

=== The capture of Washington ===
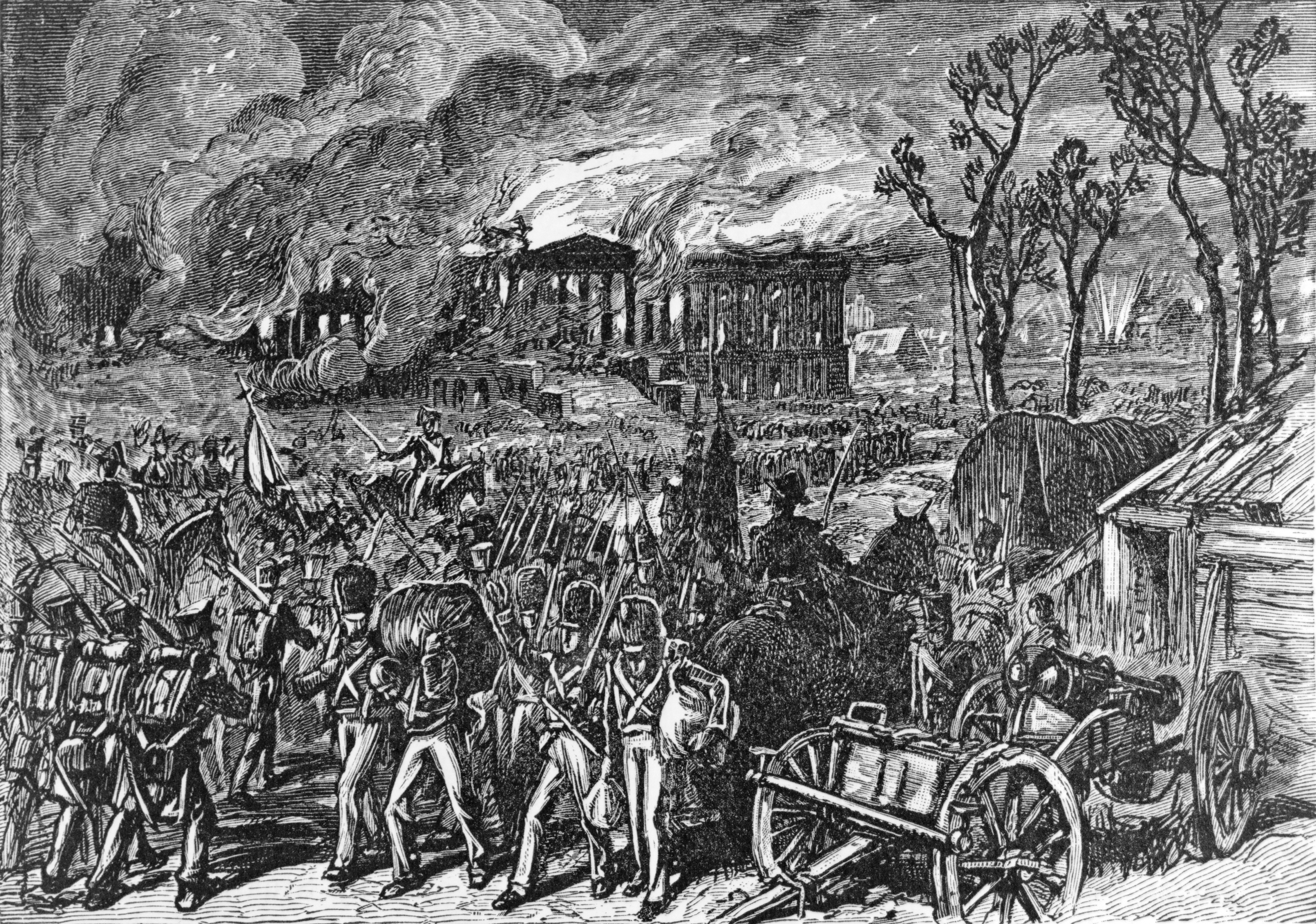
Burning of Washington, 1814

After the victory at Bladensburg, Ross was persuaded by Rear-Admiral George Cockburn that they could take Washington, D.C., and late in the evening of 24 August his army of 4,500 men (including 1,000 Royal Marines from Cockburn's flotilla) captured the capital, in spite of a larger contingent of American defenders. Under Ross' direction, his troops set fire to the city's public buildings, including the White House and the United States Capitol. Extensive damage to the interiors and the contents of both were subsequently reported.

Ross refused to accept Cockburn's recommendation to also damage private property. The attack on the National Intelligencer newspaper was led by Cockburn. Ross ordered the preservation of private property however, threatening his men with punishment if they disobeyed.

A CBC News article described Ross as a "reluctant arsonist" who needed persuasion from Cockburn to cause intentional damage. Although Cockburn had been optimistic about the possibility of capturing the capital city, author John McCavitt asserted that Ross "never dreamt for one minute that an army of 3,500 men with 1,000 marines reinforcement, with no cavalry, hardly any artillery, could march 50 miles inland and capture an enemy capital".

=== Death ===
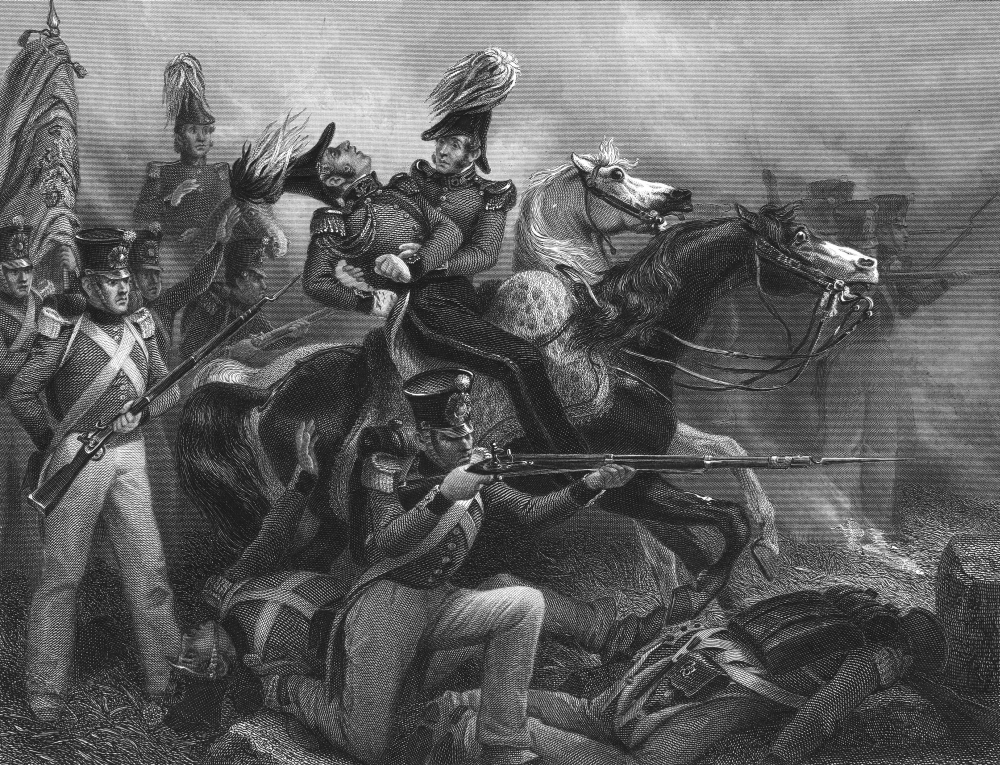
Art work, circa 1859, Death of Genl. Ross at Baltimore, Library of Congress, digital ID cph.3a10359

At the urging of Cockburn and army quartermaster-general Lieutenant George de Lacy Evans, Ross then led his army against Baltimore. His troops subsequently landed at the southern tip of the "Patapsco Neck" peninsula (between the Patapsco River and Baltimore Harbor on the south and Back River on the north) of southeastern Baltimore County at North Point, twelve miles southeast from the city, on the morning of 12 September 1814. En route to what would be the Battle of North Point, a part of the larger Battle of Baltimore, the British advance encountered American skirmishers. General Ross rode forward to personally direct his troops. An American sharpshooter shot him through the right arm into the chest. According to Baltimore folklore, two American riflemen, Daniel Wells, 18, and Henry McComas, 19, fired at him and one of them had fired the fatal shot; both were killed shortly afterward. Ross died while he was being transported back to the fleet after being shot by the American sharpshooter.

Ross's body was preserved in a barrel of 129 gallons (586 L) of Jamaican rum aboard HMS Tonnant. When the Tonnant was diverted to New Orleans, his body was shipped on the British ship HMS Royal Oak to Halifax, Nova Scotia, where his body was interred on 29 September 1814 in the Old Burying Ground.

== Legacy ==
Robert Ross Monument, Rostrevor, County Down, Northern Ireland

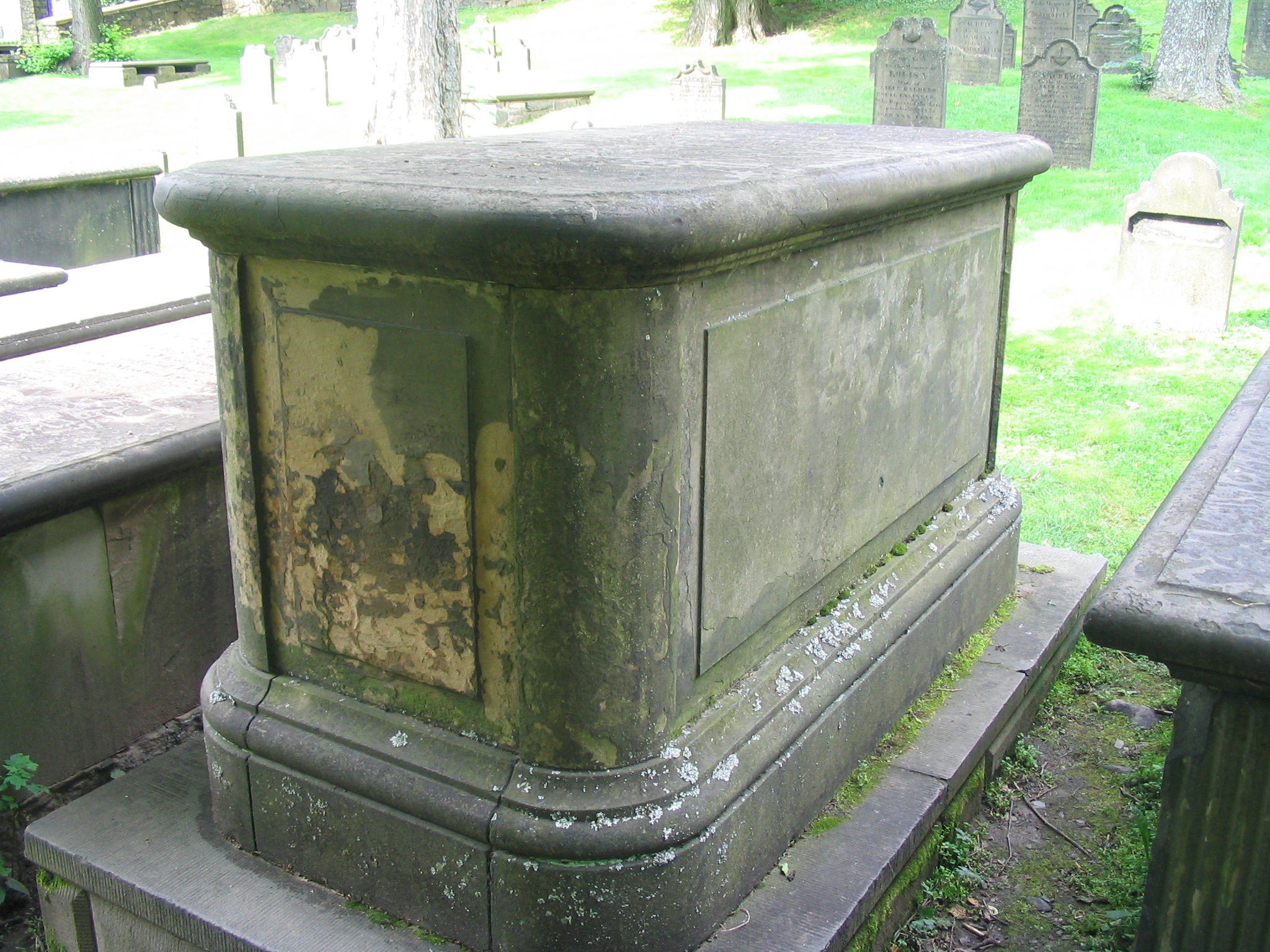
Ross's tomb in the Old Burying Ground in Halifax, Nova Scotia

In Ross's home village of Rostrevor, County Down in Northern Ireland, he is commemorated by a 99-foot granite obelisk near the shoreline of Carlingford Lough. The Monument, a 100-foot granite obelisk, was restored in 2008. A smaller monument was erected in Kilbroney Parish Church by troops who had served with Ross at the Battle of Maida in 1806. This granite memorial was erected in 1826 "on a hill within view of his heartbroken widow’s home", according to a 2013 report.

Ross is also commemorated by a National Monument in St Paul's Cathedral in London, England. The latter is described by a book about Ross as: "Britannia is represented weeping over the tomb of the departed warrior, over which an, American flag is being deposited by a figure of Valour, while Fame descends with a wreath of laurels to crown the hero’s head".

The inscription on the National Monument reads:

DEDICATED AT THE PUBLIC EXPENSE TO THE MEMORY
OF MAJOR GENERAL ROBERT ROSS
WHO HAVING UNDERTOOK AND EXECUTED AN ENTERPRISE AGAINST THE
CITY OF WASHINGTON, THE CAPITAL OF THE UNITED STATES OF AMERICA
WHICH WAS CROWNED WITH COMPLETE SUCCESS WAS KILLED SHORTLY
AFTERWARDS WHILE DIRECTING A SUCCESSFUL ATTACK UPON A SUPERIOR FORCE NEAR THE
CITY OF BALTIMORE ON THE 12TH DAY OF SEPTEMPTER 1814

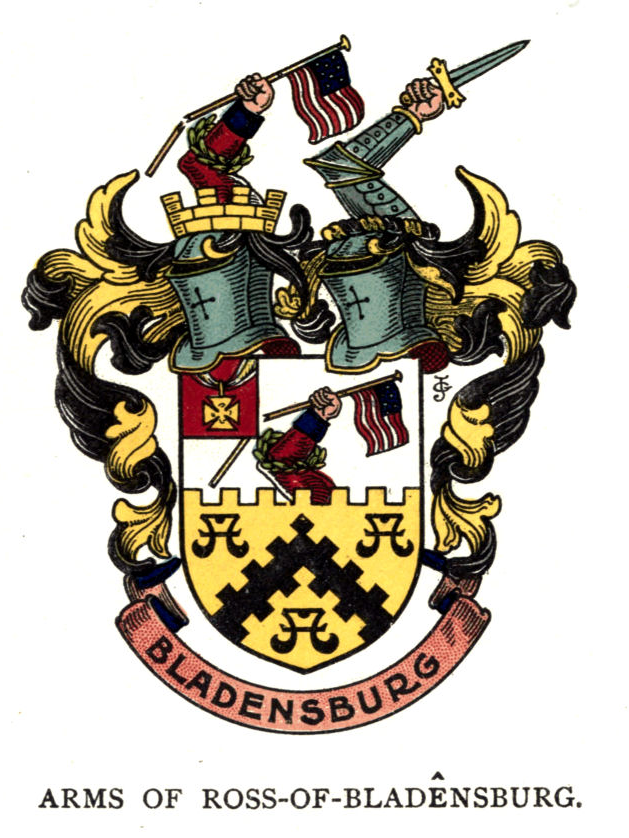
Ross-of-Bladensburg coat of arms from A.C. Fox-Davies's Complete Guide to Heraldry

By the beginning of the Troubles in the 1960s, the monument in Rostrevor—now located in a predominantly Roman Catholic region—was largely neglected and overgrown by brambles; this may have contributed to its avoiding the same fate as Nelson's Pillar in Dublin, which was reportedly blown up by the IRA in 1966. After the Good Friday Agreement in 1998, the Newry and Mourne District Council, though largely Irish republican, agreed to refurbish the monument as part of Rostrevor's history, and it was reopened in 2008.

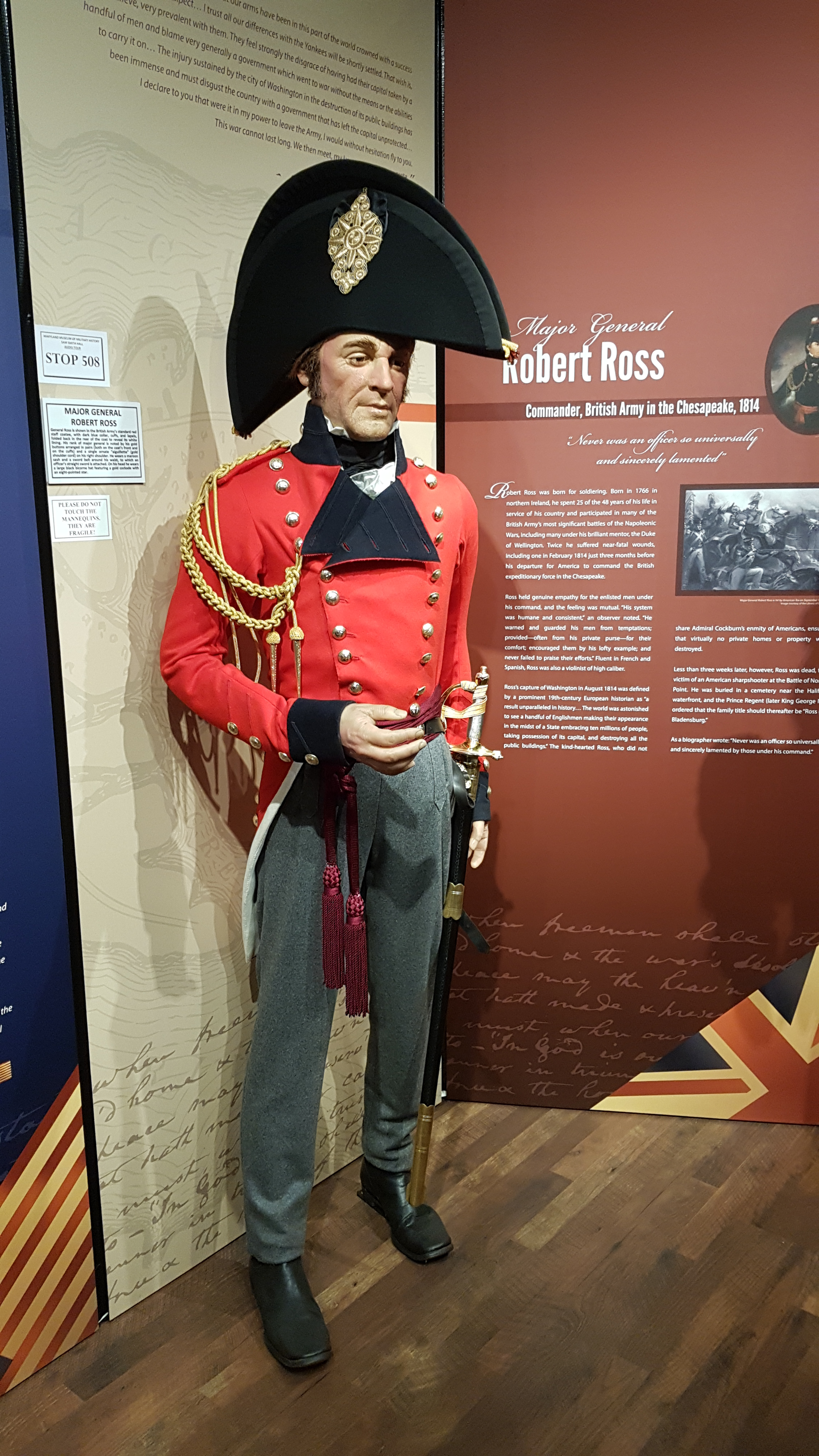
Figure of Major General Robert Ross of the British Army at the Maryland Museum of Military History, at the historic Fifth Regiment Armory, (of 1899-1900), at North Howard and 29th Division Streets, in Downtown Baltimore

Neither General Ross nor his immediate descendants were knighted while he was living or received a title of nobility. However, his descendants were given an augmentation of honour to the Ross armorial bearings (namely, the addition of a chief to the shield and a second crest, both depicting an arm grasping the old American flag with 15 stars and 15 stripes ( the Star-Spangled Banner of 1795-1818) on a broken staff, along with the additional motto of "Bladensburg") and the family name was changed to the victory title "Ross-of-Bladensburg", which was granted to his widow.

In honour of the Federal City and national capital's history of Washington, D.C., there is also a portrait of the infamous General Ross in the United States Capitol's central rotunda, along with a small art decorative vignette near a corridor ceiling portraying the Burning of Washington and exhibits in the recently-constructed underground visitors' center on the Capitol's east front. Along with several illustrations / exhibits in various War of 1812 historical sites / museums in the Baltimore metropolitan area, including a stone obelisk monument near the site off Old North Point Road in southeastern Baltimore County, erected in memory of Aquila Randall who was also killed here (dedicated in 1817 by fellow soldiers and officers of his Maryland Militia regiment), and where General Ross supposedly was shot. Additional details and exhibits have been preserved in various Baltimore historical institutions, such as the Star Spangled Banner Flag House (also known recently as the Flag House and Star-Spangled Banner Museum), 1793 historic home of flagmaker Mary Young Pickersgill in the Jonestown / Old Town neighborhood of Downtown / East Baltimore) and the National Park Service's landmark site of Fort McHenry's new visitor center extensive exhibits on Whetstone Point, by the Baltimore harbor, and also in the local community's Dundalk-Patapsco Neck Historical Society museum in Dundalk, Maryland, near the 1814 North Point battlefield in outlying southeast Baltimore County.

According to a biographical history of the Major-General by Robert Lacy,

Ross was a soldier who combined caution with courage. He was immensely popular with his men because of his willingness to share their hardships and to fight alongside them in the thick of battle. A colleague said of him that he could not be 'a better man nor a more zealous officer'. Ross also commanded the respect and admiration of his opponents because of his unfailing courtesy and chivalrous conduct. One of the leading physicians then residing in 1814 Washington paid tribute to Ross’s ‘consummate modesty and politeness’.

Local lore indicates that the two snipers/riflemen Daniel Wells and Henry McComas (of the unit of Aisquith's Sharpshooters") were first buried in a local churchyard mourned by their fellow militia soldiers and citizens of the Town, but forty years later in the 1850s were exhumed and reburied after elaborate processions and funerals in a monumental tomb with a stone obelisk in what was known then as Ashland Square. Currently, off of the triangular intersection of Aisquith, East Monument and North Gay Streets in the Jonestown/Old Town neighborhood of East Baltimore. Occasional memorial ceremonies are still held for them by War of 1812 descendents and heritage societies. The Wells-McComas Monument is depicted on the embroidered shoulder patch insignia of the Baltimore County Sheriff's Office for deputy sheriffs. City streets were also named for them in South Baltimore, off South Hanover Street (Maryland Route 2).

== Arms ==
Coat of arms of Robert Ross
Crest An arm embowed in armour, the hand grasping a dagger all proper; Augmentation: An arm in a General's uniform issuant out of a mural crown, and grasping the broken flagstaff of the standard of the United States all proper Escutcheon Or, a chevron embattled counter-embattled between three water bougets Sable; Augmentation: In chief issuant a dexter arm embowed, vested Gules, the cuff Azure, encircled by a wreath of laurel, the hand grasping a flag-staff, broken in bend sinister, therefrom flowing the colours of the United States of America; on a canton Gules, pendent from a riband, a representation of the cross presented by command of His Majesty to the late Major-General Ross, in testimony of his Royal approbation of his services proper Motto PER ASPERA VIRTUS (Latin for 'Virtue through hardship'); Augmentation: BLADENSBURG
