= Edward Johnson (mayor) =

American mayor (1767–1829)

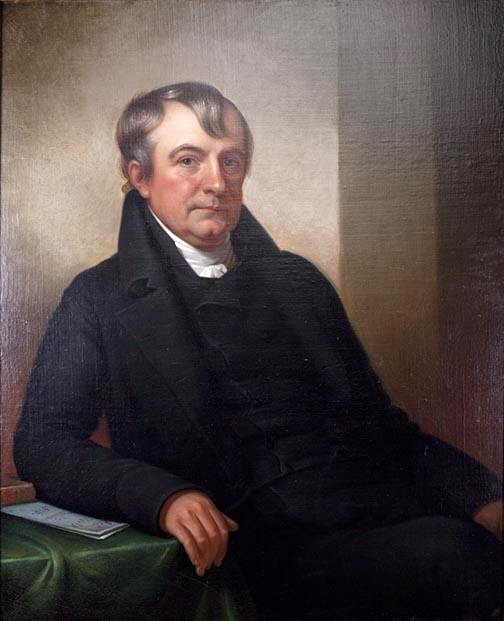
- Portrait by Rembrandt Peale

3rd Mayor of Baltimore
- In office 1808–1816
- Preceded by: Thorowgood Smith
- Succeeded by: George Stiles
- In office 1819–1820
- Preceded by: George Stiles
- Succeeded by: John Montgomery
- In office 1822–1824
- Preceded by: John Montgomery
- Succeeded by: John Montgomery

Personal details
- Born: 1767 Baltimore, Province of Maryland, British America
- Died: 1829 (aged 61–62) Baltimore, Maryland, U.S.
- Party: Democratic-Republican
- Occupation: Politician; businessman

Edward Johnson (1767 – 1829) was an American politician and businessman. He was a native of Baltimore, Maryland and served as that city's mayor for six terms between 1808 and 1824. A staunch member of Jefferson's Democratic-Republican Party, he led Baltimore during the War of 1812 and was instrumental in organizing the civilian defense of the city. For several years he was the owner of one of Baltimore's largest breweries and also served as a director of the Bank of Baltimore.

== Biography ==
Johnson was born in Baltimore in 1767, the son of a prominent physician in that city. Little is known about his early life, and many 19th and early 20th century biographies have mistakenly referred to him as a doctor, confusing him with his father who was also named Edward Johnson. In 1797, he was elected to the City Council, a requirement for which was ownership of property assessed at a minimum of $2000, a very large sum in those days. His occupation in 1798 was listed as "brewer". Johnson's sister Rebecca had married brewery owner Thomas Peters in 1783. Johnson's father later became a partner in his son-in-law's business. When Dr. Johnson died in 1797, Edward Johnson took over his father's share in the company, eventually becoming its sole owner by 1807.

Fiercely anti-British and a member of Thomas Jefferson's Democratic-Republican party, Johnson was elected Baltimore's third mayor in 1808. A triumphal victory parade took place to celebrate his election with Johnson on board a horse-drawn boat on wheels. A bonfire was lit on Gallows Hill, and "to give its flame a brighter glow", six large casks of imported gin from Holland (on which England had exacted tax) were thrown onto it. He was subsequently re-elected in 1810, 1812, and 1814. (At the time, the mayor's term of office was only two years.) He remained in the brewery business during his first two terms as mayor. However, the brewery burnt down in 1812 and after he had it rebuilt in 1813 he sold it to George Brown. A month later, Mary Pickersgill assembled the famous Star Spangled Banner Flag on the brewery's floor.

Johnson's third term as mayor coincided with the War of 1812. Shortly after the outbreak of the war and despite his strong anti-British sentiments and anti-Federalist political views, he was nearly killed unsuccessfully trying to stop a mob who had stormed the Baltimore City Jail intent on lynching Alexander Hanson, the publisher of an extreme Federalist newspaper, and his allies who included Henry "Light-Horse Harry" Lee. During the Battle of Baltimore Johnson headed the Committee of Vigilance and Safety and, over the head of General William Winder, had General Samuel Smith put in command of the city's defense.

When Johnson left office in 1816 after his fourth consecutive term as mayor, his portrait was painted by Rembrandt Peale, beginning the City of Baltimore's custom of paying for a portrait of each outgoing mayor, a custom which continues to this day. He was later appointed mayor in 1819 to finish out the term of George Stiles who had resigned from office and died shortly thereafter. It was during this period that Johnson guided the city through a serious epidemic of yellow fever and commissioned a report on the possible causes of the outbreak from the physicians who had attended the victims. When the City Council refused to pay for the publication of the report, he contributed $150 of his own money towards the cost of printing. Johnson was elected mayor again in 1822 and served until 1824 after which he retired from political life.

During the course of his career, Johnson also served as a judge of the County Court, a trustee of St. Peter's School (a home for orphan boys), and a director of the Bank of Baltimore. He had married Elizabeth Mackubin in 1798. Their only child, a son, died at the age of 15. Edward Johnson died on 18 April 1829 at the age of 62 and was buried in Westminster Burying Ground. His obituary in Niles' Weekly Register described him as:

one of the most benevolent men that ever lived—remarkable for his fidelity to his friends, though kind unto all men. He filled the office of a delegate to the General Assembly, was twice or thrice an Elector of our Senate, and as often an Elector of President or Vice President of the United States, and six or seven times chosen Mayor of the city—the duties of all which he performed much to the satisfaction of the people—and without the suspicion of one improper motive.

The house where Edward and Elizabeth Johnson lived on East Lombard Street, not far from the site of the brewery he once owned, is still standing and bears a commemorative plaque as does a tree dedicated to him at Fort McHenry National Monument and Historic Shrine.
