= Claggett =

Claggett, Clagget or Clagett is both a surname and a given name. Notable people with the name include:

Surname:

- Anthony Claggett (born 1984), American baseball player
- Charles Clagget (1740–c.1795), Irish composer, instrument maker and inventor
- Clifton Clagett (1762–1829), American lawyer and politician
- Galen R. Clagett (born 1942), American politician (Maryland)
- Nicholas Clagett (1686–1746), English bishop
- Steve Claggett (born 1989), Canadian professional boxer
- Thomas John Claggett (1743–1816), first bishop of Maryland
- Virginia P. Clagett (born 1943), American politician (Maryland)
- William B. Clagett (1854–1911), American farmer and politician
- William H. Clagett (1838–1901), American politician and lawyer

Given name:

- Claggett Wilson (1887–1952), American painter

== See also ==
- Claggett's Brewery, a 19th-century brewery in Maryland (US)
- Claggett Middle School
- Claggett Shale, a geographical formation in Montana (US)
