= Brown's Brewery =

Brewery located on East Lombard Street in Baltimore, Maryland, US

Coordinates: 39°17′18″N 76°36′16″W

Brown's Brewery was a brewery located on East Lombard Street in Baltimore, Maryland. In 1813, Mary Pickersgill sewed the famous Star Spangled Banner Flag in one of its malthouses. At the time, the brewery was owned by Baltimore merchant George I. Brown who had bought it from Edward Johnson, the third mayor of Baltimore. George Brown sold the brewery to Eli Claggett in 1818, and until its final closure in 1879, it was known as Claggett's Brewery. The site once occupied by the brewery was excavated in 1983 as the Baltimore Center for Urban Archeology's first project.

== History ==
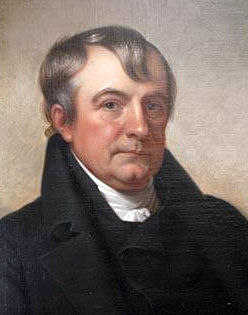
Edward Johnson (1767–1829), owner of the brewery prior to its sale to George Brown in 1813

The brewery, which for a while was known as The Baltimore Strong Beer Brewery, was founded in 1783 by Thomas Peters, who had come to Baltimore from Philadelphia to manufacture beer for the French and American troops during the American Revolution. Peters married Rebecca Johnson, the daughter of Baltimore physician Edward Johnson, in October 1783. Johnson later became a partner in his son-in-law's brewery business, and it was then called Peters, Johnson, and Company. When Edward Johnson died in 1797, his son, Edward Johnson Jr. (1767–1829), took over his father's share in the company and eventually became its sole owner.

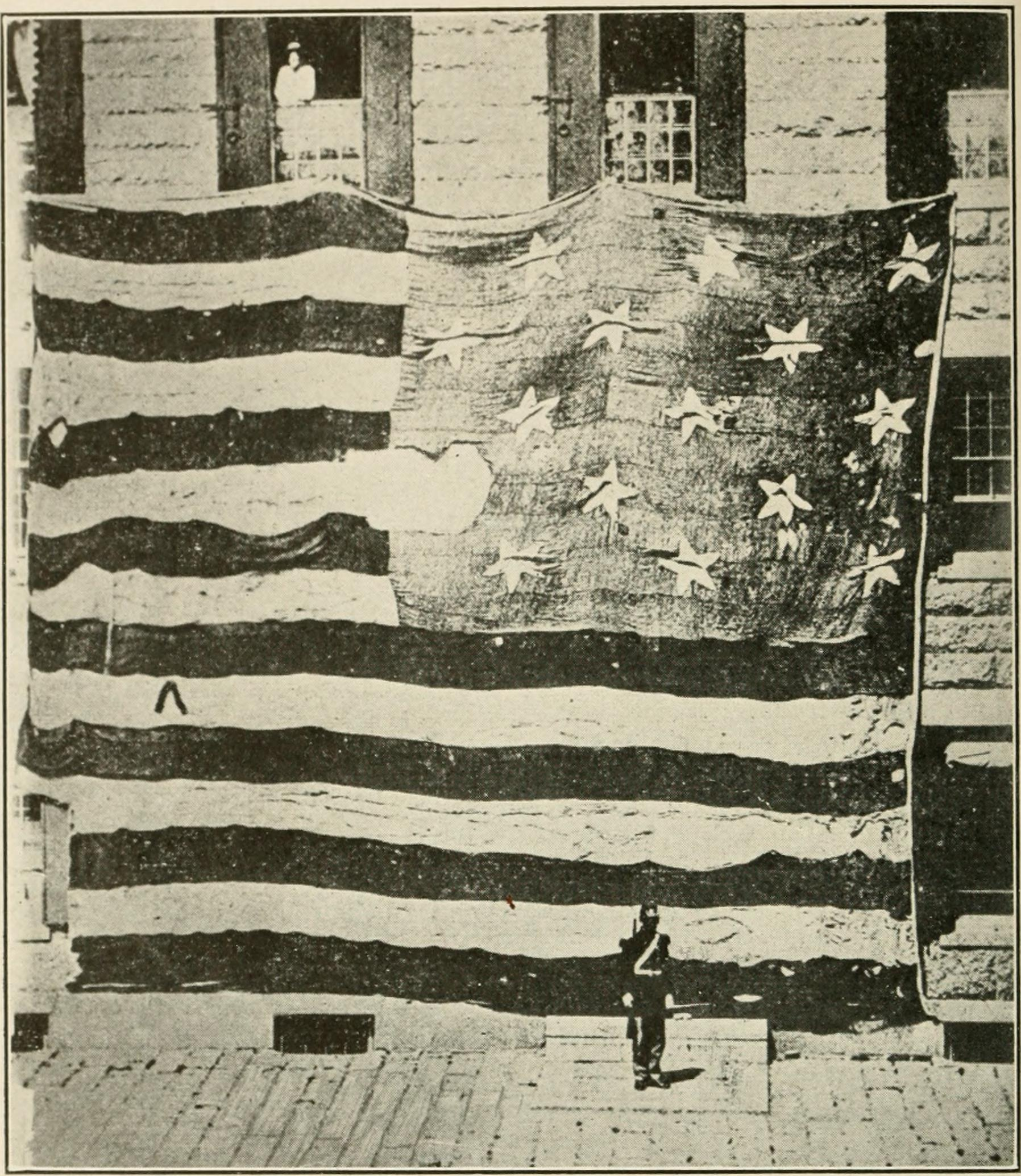
Mary Pickersgill's flag, photographed in 1873 in the Boston Navy Yard

Edward Johnson Jr. was elected mayor of Baltimore in 1808 and would serve in that capacity (with two interruptions) until 1824. The main brewery buildings burnt down on November 21, 1812, at an estimated loss of $80,000 but were soon rebuilt. However, according to Rob Kasper writing in The Baltimore Sun, the mayor found that simultaneously "brewing and governing" was too demanding and put the newly rebuilt brewery up for sale in 1813. The advertisement for the auction described the property as "the most complete establishment of its kind in the United States" and consisting of a brewhouse, two 100 by 30 feet malthouses with a granary over each, a brick counting house, a cooperage, a two-story dwelling, a stone coach house, and a stable.

George I. Brown, a local merchant, bought the brewery at the auction on July 14, 1813. He was an acquaintance of Mary Pickersgill, who had been commissioned by Colonel George Armistead in 1813 to make a large flag (30 by 42 feet) to fly over Fort McHenry. Pickersgill did not have adequate space in her house to assemble a flag of that size and lived only a block away from Brown's Brewery. Brown permitted her to assemble what became known as the Star Spangled Banner Flag on the floor of one of his malthouses.

Brown had only limited success as a brewer and in 1818 sold the brewery to Eli Claggett, a former soldier wounded during the bombardment of Fort McHenry, who then operated it as Claggett's Brewery. In 1850 it produced 50,000 barrels of beer and was the largest of the city's 11 breweries. The Claggett family continued to run the brewery until 1879 when the business closed and the property was sold to the National Casket Company. The old brewery buildings, which were used to store caskets, were destroyed in the 1904 Great Baltimore Fire along with much of Baltimore's business district.

The corner on East Lombard Street which Brown's Brewery used to occupy later became known as Brewer's Park. A commemorative plaque was placed on the site, although it erroneously gave Claggett's name as the owner of the brewery when Mary Pickersgill assembled the flag. A similar anachronism appears in Robert McGill Mackall's 1976 painting, Mary Pickersgill Making the Star-Spangled Banner (on display at the Maryland Historical Society) which depicts several beer barrels in the background labelled "Claggett's Brewery". The site was acquired by the city of Baltimore in 1970 and in 1983 became the first project of the Baltimore Center for Urban Archeology. Much of the present knowledge about the brewery's history was the result of the project's archeological and archival research. The site is now occupied by a Marriott Hotel.

== Timeline ==
- 1812 – Edward Johnson and Company Brewery burns down
- 1813 – Rebuilt by Johnson and sold to George Brown
- 1813 – Mary Pickersgill sews the famous Star Spangled Banner Flag in Brown's Brewery
- 1818 – George Brown sells the brewery to Eli Claggett
- 1879 – Claggett's Brewery closes

== See also ==
- List of defunct breweries in the United States
