= Rebecca Young (flag maker) =

American Revolution flag maker

Rebecca (Flower) Young was a flag maker during the American Revolution. Her name appears in the logs of the commissary general for making "Continental Standards" as early as 1781, making her one of the earlier verified makers of the Flag of the United States. In addition to flags, she was also paid for making blankets and drum cases between the years of 1780 and 1785. In 1781, Young ran an ad in the Pennsylvania Packet advertising "all kinds of colors for the Army and Navy." She also sewed the standard for the First American Regiment under Colonel Josiah Harmar.

Young had several family connections to important figures in United States history. In 1777, her brother, Colonel Benjamin Flower, was credited with saving the famous musical icon Liberty Bell from the tower of the old Pennsylvania State House (now "Independence Hall") when British forces captured Philadelphia. Her son, Dr. Benjamin Young, learned his profession from Dr. Benjamin Rush. Her daughter Mary Young Pickersgill, (1776–1857), sewed the flag for Baltimore's Fort McHenry, which is what inspired Francis Scott Key to write the current National Anthem, as well as another smaller flag. This was done with her daughter Caroline along with house staff beginning at her 1793 row house at East Pratt and Albemarle Streets and finishing on the floor of a nearby Johnson's/Claggett's Brewery on Front Street, and delivered to Major George Armistead at the Fort in 1813, receiving a government-issued receipt for two flags, a 30 by 42 foot "garrison flag" and a smaller "storm flag" of 17 by 25 feet. Later flown at Fort McHenry outside Baltimore, Maryland that inspired Francis Scott Key, (1779–1843), to pen the words to the poem that became The Star-Spangled Banner.
