= Impartial Female Humane Society =

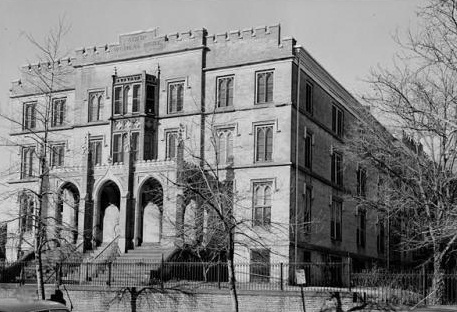
- Aged women's home built by the society in 1850
- Formation: 1802
- Dissolved: 1849; re-incorporated as the Baltimore Humane Impartial Society and Aged Women's Home
- Purpose: To provide assistance to widowed and abandoned women
- Headquarters: Baltimore, Maryland
- Region served: Baltimore
- President: Mary Pickersgill (1828-1851)
- Remarks: This organization has evolved into the Pickersgill Retirement Community of Towson, Maryland

The Impartial Female Humane Society was an early 19th-century benevolent organization established to assist distressed women in Baltimore, Maryland. The society was formed in 1802 and incorporated in 1811. Its most noted president was Mary Pickersgill, the seamstress who made the Star Spangled Banner Flag, who served from 1828 to 1851. Under Pickersgill, the society opened an Aged Women's Home in 1851. The home, which was supplemented with a men's home in 1864, became the focus of the society, and today the organization has evolved into the Pickersgill Retirement Community in Towson, Maryland.

== History ==
In 1802, "several ladies" formed the Impartial Female Humane Society for the purpose of assisting "the deserving widow and deserted wife" and to establish a "Male Free School, upon liberal principles." The Society was incorporated in 1811. In 1828, Mary Pickersgill became the president of the society, and served in this role continuously until 1851.

In the beginning, the organization sought to find employment for the destitute women, but eventually found that as they aged, they needed a suitable home. In 1849, the organization was reincorporated as "The Baltimore Humane Impartial Society and Aged Women's Home," for the express purpose of enlarging its sphere of activity to include the aged. The Society had the previous December announced its plan to build an aged women's home in Baltimore, and obtained a lot measuring 80 feet front by 150 feet depth. Fifty feet of the frontage was contributed to the Society by James Canby of Wilmington, Delaware. Canby was developing 33 acres of nearby land for residences. The home was one of the first buildings to be erected in his development. In the same announcement, the Society urged merchants and artisans to contribute materials and labor to the building. Thomas Dixon, an architect, supplied general drawings. In July 1849, a number of carpenters submitted bids for construction. L.G. Shipley estimated the total cost as $15,240, and was willing to do the carpenter's work at a deduction of 55% from the standard measurement prices, and also donate $225 to the Society.

An article in the Baltimore Sun on June 4, 1850, gave these particulars of the home:

The Widows Home -- This is the name of a really beautiful specimen of architecture, now rapidly approaching completion, and situated on West Lexington Street ... [the first floor] contains fourteen single chambers, each containing a window, and with opening into a spacious hall ... The second story likewise contains fourteen single chambers, as does the story above, all of which are nine feet wide and fifteen deep. The board room is an apartment in the second story, commanding the front, which will be finished in the most elegant manner; adjoining which is the apartment for the matron ... Each story is supplied with bath rooms, water closets, and every convenience which a well constructed residence affords; and in the third is an apartment designed for an infirmary ... The basement contains a kitchen, dining room, sewing apartment, pantries and cellar, and beneath the entrance is a fine arrangement for a refrigerator on a large scale.

Mary Pickersgill was still serving as president of the Society in 1851 when the doors to the Aged Women's Home first opened at West Lexington Street and Franklin Square. The Gothic Tudor building became a city landmark. Fourteen years later, an Aged Men's Home was built adjacent to the Aged Women's Home.

In 1864, the organization's charter was again changed to include a home for aged men, and about this time the school was closed.

== Pickersgill Retirement Community ==
By the 1950s, the original homes required considerable repairs, and the board of directors decided to build a new home. They chose a 16-acre site in Towson, Maryland, familiar to the residents: it had served as a summer vacation retreat since 1943 when a bequest from Roberta and Augusta McLaughlin made the purchase of the property possible. The residents moved to the new location in 1959, after which the original buildings were razed. The new residence, designed by Bryden B. Hyde, was renamed the Pickersgill Retirement Community in 1962. The home continues to operate with a variety of independent living, assisted living and skilled nursing care accommodations.
