= Michael Ciannilli =

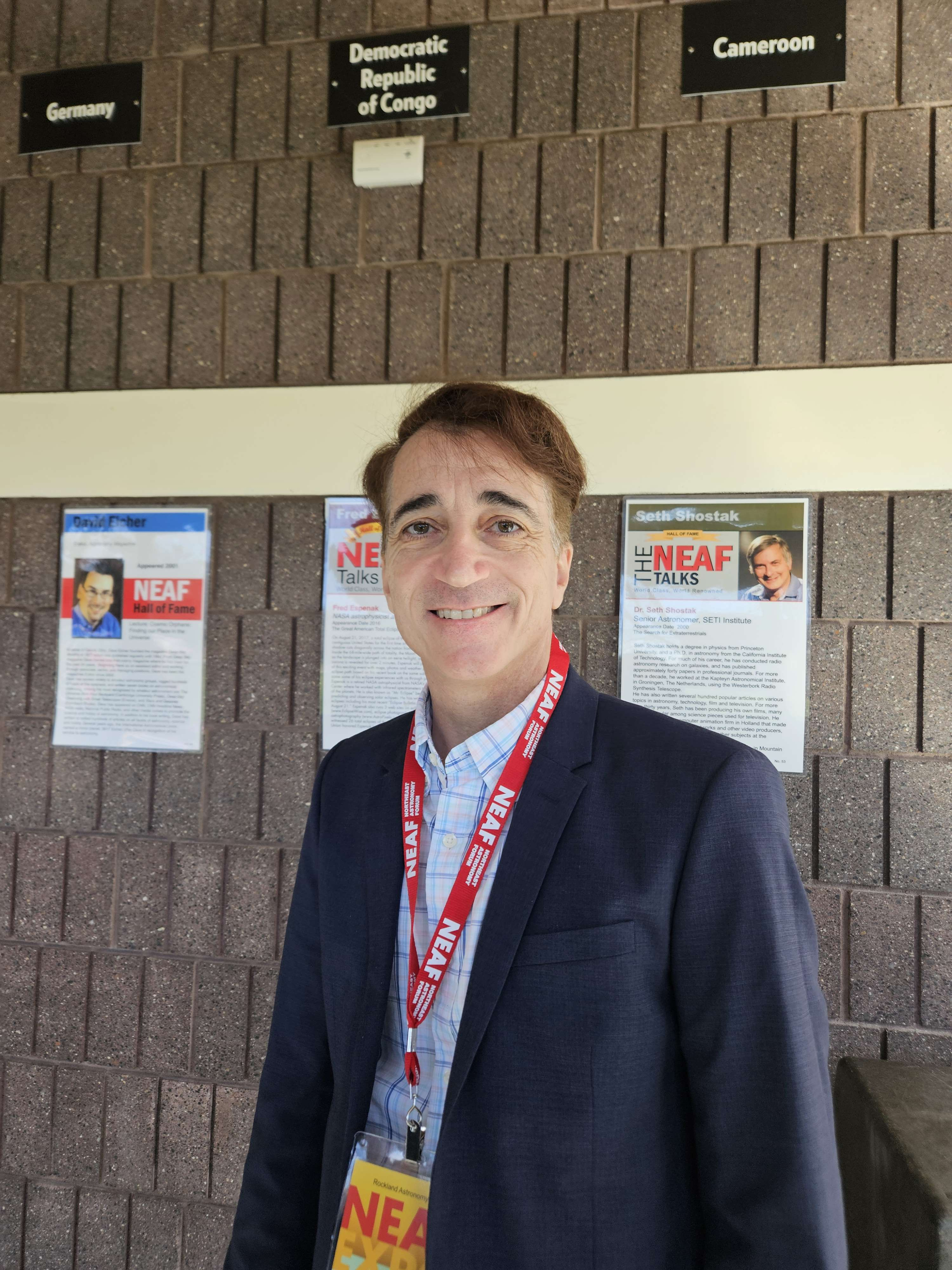
- Ciannilli in 2026
- Education: Florida Institute of Technology (B.Sc)
- Occupation: NASA executive
- Years active: 2005–present

Michael ("Mike") Ciannilli is an American executive who currently works for NASA. He joined in 2005 and currently manages the Apollo Challenger Columbia Lessons Learned Program (ACCLLP). In this role, he produces multimedia and storytelling events at Kennedy Space Center, focusing on the emotions behind the accidents.

== Career ==
Before assuming his current position, he was a curator of NASA's Columbia Research and Preservation Office. Prior to NASA, he served for eight years as a Test Project Engineer under contract with the United Space Alliance. He spent childhood years in Syracuse, N.Y.

After the Space Shuttle Columbia disaster, Ciannilli participated by helicopter in searching East Texas for wreckage. What he and others found – over 80,000 pieces - was cataloged and laid out in a room at NASA's Vehicle Assembly Building. Some of the items recovered are included in a memorial to those who lost their lives in the shuttle disasters, "Forever Remembered", located at the Kennedy Space Center.

One special item in the memorial exhibit, Ciannilli personally retrieved from the silo in which wreckage retrieved from the Challenger disaster is permanently entombed. It is a fifteen-foot section bearing the damaged but recognizable Star-Spangled Banner.

== Awards and recognitions ==
In the course of his work with NASA, Ciannilli has received numerous awards. These include:

- NASA Exceptional Achievement Medal
- NASA Program Leadership Award
- Launch and Landing Leadership Award
- Launch Countdown Simulation Contingency Leadership Award
- NASA Quest Outreach Award
- Columbia Recovery Team Award
