= George Stiles (politician) =

American politician (1760–1819)

4th Mayor of Baltimore
- In office 1816–1819
- Preceded by: Edward Johnson
- Succeeded by: Edward Johnson

Personal details
- Born: 1760
- Died: January 16, 1819 (aged 58–59)
- Party: Democratic-Republican
- Occupation: Politician

George Stiles (1760 – January 16, 1819) was a politician and merchant who served as the fourth mayor of Baltimore, in the Democratic-Republican Party, from 1816 to 1819. He served one full term before resigning from his second term, the second resignation of a Baltimore mayor. It is likely that Stiles resigned as a result of bad health, as he died several months later. Stiles died on January 16, 1819.
