= Amelia Fowler =

American embroidery teacher & flag preserver (1862-1923)

Amelia S. Bold Fowler (1862 in England – January 9, 1923 in Boston, Massachusetts), an embroidery teacher and well-known flag preserver, was the master needle worker who restored the original Star Spangled Banner in 1914. By that time, the flag that inspired Francis Scott Key to write the United States national anthem (The Star-Spangled Banner) was just "a frail piece of bunting." But Fowler called upon her patented preservation techniques to save it from further deterioration. She used dyed-to-match silk thread and employed ten assistants to reinforce the 1,020-square-foot (95 m^{2}) relic. They anchored it onto Irish linen with 1.7 million of Fowler's special honeycomb patterned, six-sided stitches. It took eight weeks to finish the preservation process. Upon completion, she claimed the restored flag would "defy the test of time," and charged the government $1,243.

Eighty-four years later, in 1998, ongoing conservation efforts at the Smithsonian Institution budgeted $18.2 million to preserving the same flag. Today, all of the stitches from Fowler's earlier preservation attempt have been removed, as well as the linen backing.
