= Flag Acts =

Series of laws defining the flag of the early United States (1777, 1794, and 1818)

The Flag Acts are three laws that sought to define the design of the flag of the United States. All the submitted suggestions were remarkably short, the shortest being a sentence of 31 words, and the longest being a title and two sentences of 117 words.

The brevity of the Acts leave a lot of ambiguity since neither the size or shape of the flag nor the exact colors or the size or placement of the design elements is specified. In 1912, there were 66 different designs in use which led William Howard Taft to address some of those shortcomings by issuing Executive Order 1556 which specified the size and placement of the design elements and the size and shape of the flag but not the specific colors. Executive Order 1637 later added a specific design example. The specifications were later further refined and revised by further executive orders but never codified into law. As of May 2023, Executive Order 10834 issued by Dwight D. Eisenhower in 1960 is the most recent executive order to establish these specifications. Since executive orders can be revoked or modified by any president, future presidents could change the look of the flag used by federal agencies at will.

== Flag Act of 1777 ==
13-star, 13-stripe, Hopkinson flag

The Flag Act of 1777, also known as the Flag Resolution of 1777, ("Journals of the Continental Congress, 1774–1789, 8:464".) was passed by the Second Continental Congress on June 14, 1777, in response to a petition made by a Native American nation on June 3 for "an American Flag." As a result, June 14 is now celebrated as Flag Day in the United States.

=== Text ===
Resolved, That the flag of the thirteen United States be thirteen stripes, alternate red and white; that the union be thirteen stars, white in a blue field, representing a new constellation.

== Flag Act of 1794 ==
15-star, 15-stripe flag, Star-Spangled Banner flag

The Flag Act of 1794 (1 Stat. 341) was signed into law by President George Washington on January 13, 1794. It changed the design of the flag to accommodate the admission into the Union of the states of Vermont and Kentucky. It provided for fifteen stripes as well as fifteen stars. This was the only official flag of the United States not to have thirteen stripes.

=== Text ===
An Act making an alteration in the Flag of the United States. Be it enacted by the Senate and House of Representatives of the United States of America in Congress Assembled, That from and after the first day of May, Anno Domini, one thousand seven hundred and ninety-five, the flag of the United States, be fifteen stripes alternate red and white. That the Union be fifteen stars, white in a blue field.

== Flag Act of 1818 ==
Flag Act of 1818
- Long title: An Act to establish the flag of the United States
- Nicknames: Third Flag Act
- Enacted by: the 15th United States Congress
- Effective: July 4, 1818

Citations
- Statutes at Large: 3 Stat. 415

Codification
- Acts amended: Flag Act of 1794

Legislative history
- Introduced in the House by Peter H. Wendover; Signed into law by President James Monroe on April 4, 1818

20-star, 13-stripe flag

The Flag Act of 1818 (3 Stat. 415) was enacted by Congress on April 4, 1818. It provided for the modern rule of having thirteen horizontal stripes and having the number of stars match the current number of states. It also provided that subsequent changes in the number of stars be made on July 4, Independence Day.

As the result of the lack of a Flag Act between 1794 and 1818, there were no official U.S. flags with sixteen, seventeen, eighteen, or nineteen stars. No flag laws were enacted to accompany the admission of new states to the Union during this period.

=== Text ===
Chap. XXXIV. — An Act to establish the flag of the United States.

Be it enacted by the Senate and House of Representatives of the United States of America, in Congress assembled, That from and after the fourth day of July next, the flag of the United States be thirteen horizontal stripes, alternate red and white: that the union be twenty stars, white in a blue field.

Sec. 2. And be it further enacted, That on the admission of every new state into the Union, one star be added to the union of the flag; and that such addition shall take effect of the fourth day of July then next succeeding such admission.

Approved, April 4, 1818.
