= Flag House & Star-Spangled Banner Museum =

Historic house in Maryland, United States

- Star-Spangled Banner Flag House
- U.S. National Register of Historic Places
- U.S. National Historic Landmark
- Baltimore City Landmark
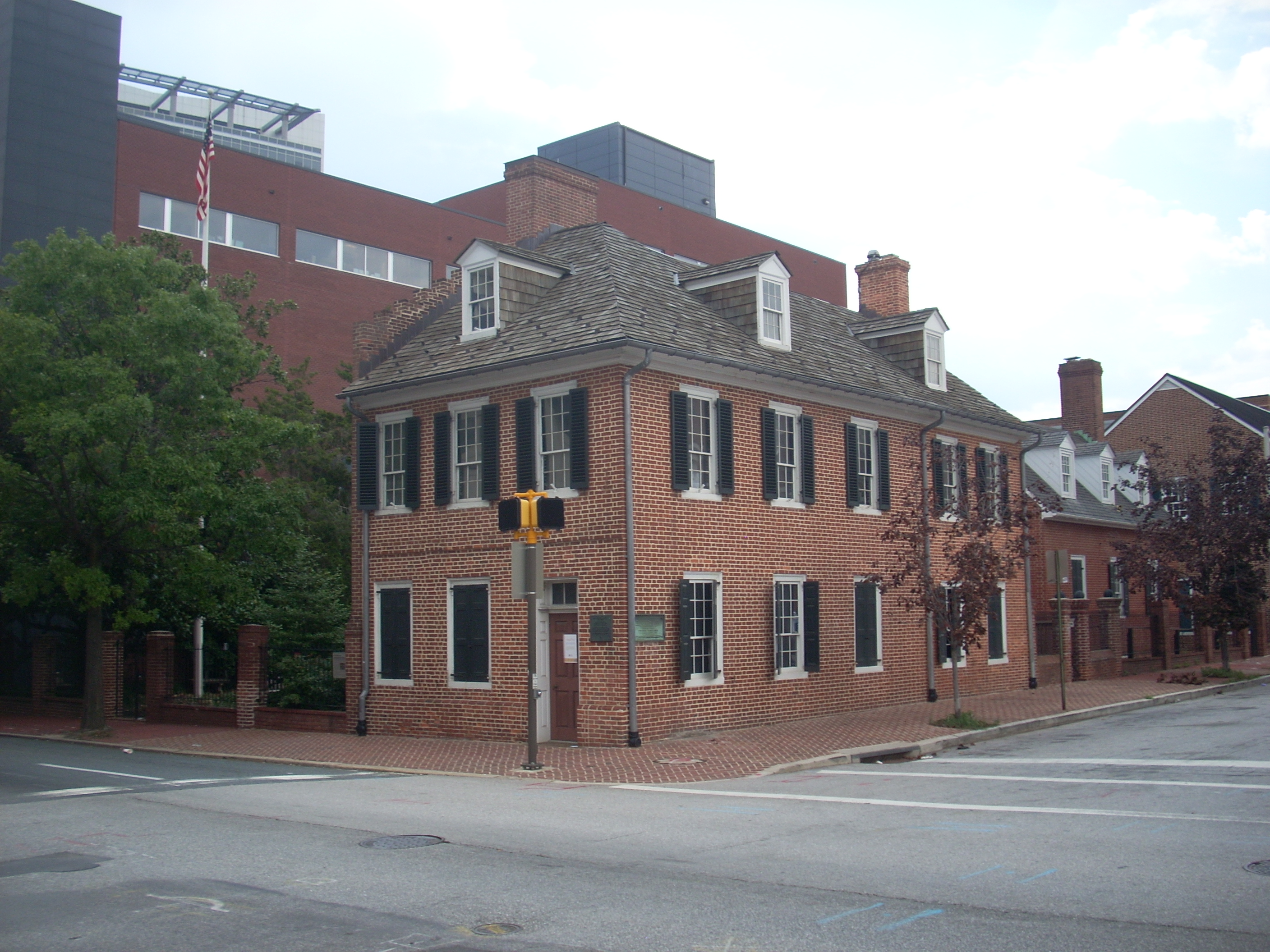
- Star-Spangled Banner Flag House in 2011
- Interactive map of Star-Spangled Banner Flag House
- Location: 844 East Pratt Street at Albemarle Street, Baltimore, Maryland, U.S.
- Coordinates: 39°17′14.7″N 76°36′11.7″W
- Built: 1793
- Architectural style: Federal style
- NRHP reference No.: 69000320

Significant dates
- Added to NRHP: December 3, 1969
- Designated NHL: December 16, 1969
- Designated BCL: 1975

The Star-Spangled Banner Flag House, formerly the Flag House & Star-Spangled Banner Museum, is a museum located in the Jonestown/Old Town and adjacent to Little Italy neighborhoods of eastern downtown Baltimore, Maryland, United States.

Built in 1793, it was the home of Mary Young Pickersgill when she moved to Baltimore in 1806 and the location where she later sewed the "Star Spangled Banner," in 1813, the huge out-sized garrison flag that flew over Fort McHenry at Whetstone Point in Baltimore Harbor in the summer of 1814 during the British Royal Navy attack in the Battle of Baltimore during the War of 1812. The museum contains furniture and antiques from the Federal period as well as items from the Pickersgill family.

A supplemental 12,600-square-foot (1,170 m^{2}) museum was constructed to the rear next to Pickersgill's home. This museum houses exhibits on the War of 1812 and the Battle of Baltimore. It has an orientation theater, gift shop, exhibit galleries, and meeting rooms. The museum features a 30 by 42-foot (13 m) tall window which was created to be the same color, size, and design of the original "Star-Spangled Banner" flag of 15 stars and 15 stripes made by Pickersgill in the adjacent Flag House and completed on the floor of a nearby brewery by members of her family and servants/slaves. Set into the ground outside the museum is a map of the United States, with each state formed from a piece of stone quarried within its borders.

== Post Pickersgill ==
In 1927 the house was sold to the City of Baltimore and the newly established Star-Spangled Banner Flag House Association which grew out of a number of members who had participated in the earlier Centennial Celebration in 1914. In the twenty years prior to that, the home had been used for a variety of services including: a post office, bank and shipping facility. Prior to 1908 the house was occupied by Placido Milio and his family. In 1928 it was dubbed a historic shrine.

== Restoration ==
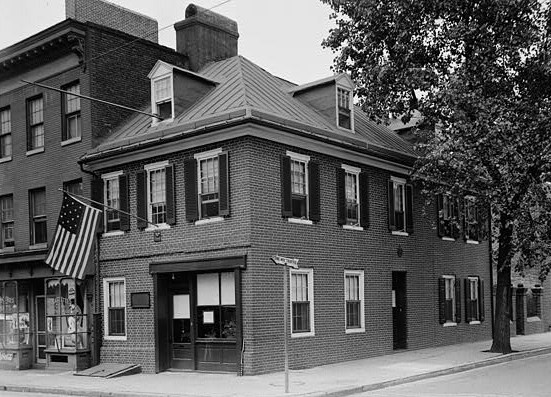
The Flag House in 1936

Additional restoration and expansion efforts were initiated in 1952 by Mayor Thomas J. D’Alesandro, Jr., twenty-five years after the initial establishment in 1927-1928 of a historical museum in the Flag House. The expansion included a smaller brick building to the rear/north for a museum with exhibits area and office space. Mayor D'Alesandro was especially interested and concerned since he had lived all his life just a few blocks away to the southeast in the neighborhood of "Little Italy". The hope was to complete the home to a full restoration including replica furnishings from the time period. Although some of the money used to fuel this project came from emergency funds for the year, donations were also accepted. Most notably, the Daughters of the American Revolution provided a significant donation. The Flag House Association worked to organize this program. An early proposal for saving the deteriorating building included a 1946 plan to physically move the Flag House to a resting place in Fort McHenry, however those efforts failed. Despite the redevelopment of this historic landmark, modernization of the area surrounding the home caused controversy. Many claimed that the proposed east–west route of the cross-city Interstate 95 with an interchange connection to the southern end of the Jones Falls Expressway (Interstate 83), running through the historical neighborhoods of Federal Hill and Fells Point on either side of the harbor waterfront, would ruin the natural antique environment of the historic site home.

The house was already designated a National Historic Landmark under the Historic Sites Act of 1935 program of the U. S. Department of the Interior's National Park Service in 1969.

== Activism ==
At various times in its history, the Flag House has served as the backdrop for patriotic activism.

At a Flag House ceremony in June 1955 celebrating the opening of National Flag Week, retired Brigadier General Bonner Fellers in a speech advocated for "an overwhelming air force, without conscription" and an end to diplomatic ties with the Soviet Union. He also warned against ceding American sovereignty through a status of forces treaty and strongly urged in favor of the adaptation of the Bricker Amendment.

In June 1961, during a dedication ceremony for the stone map, Representative Gordon L. McDonough (R., CA) stood before a crowd of 375 people and advocated for a return "to good old-fashioned American patriotism" and for adopting Flag Day as a national holiday.

In May 1980, the Flag House held a press conference where they launched a nationwide drive to encourage all Americans to "Pause for the Pledge" on Flag Day, which in June 1985, was signed into law by President Ronald Reagan in Public Law 99–54, recognizing the pause for the Pledge of Allegiance as part of National Flag Day activities.
