= George Armistead =

American military officer (1780-1818)

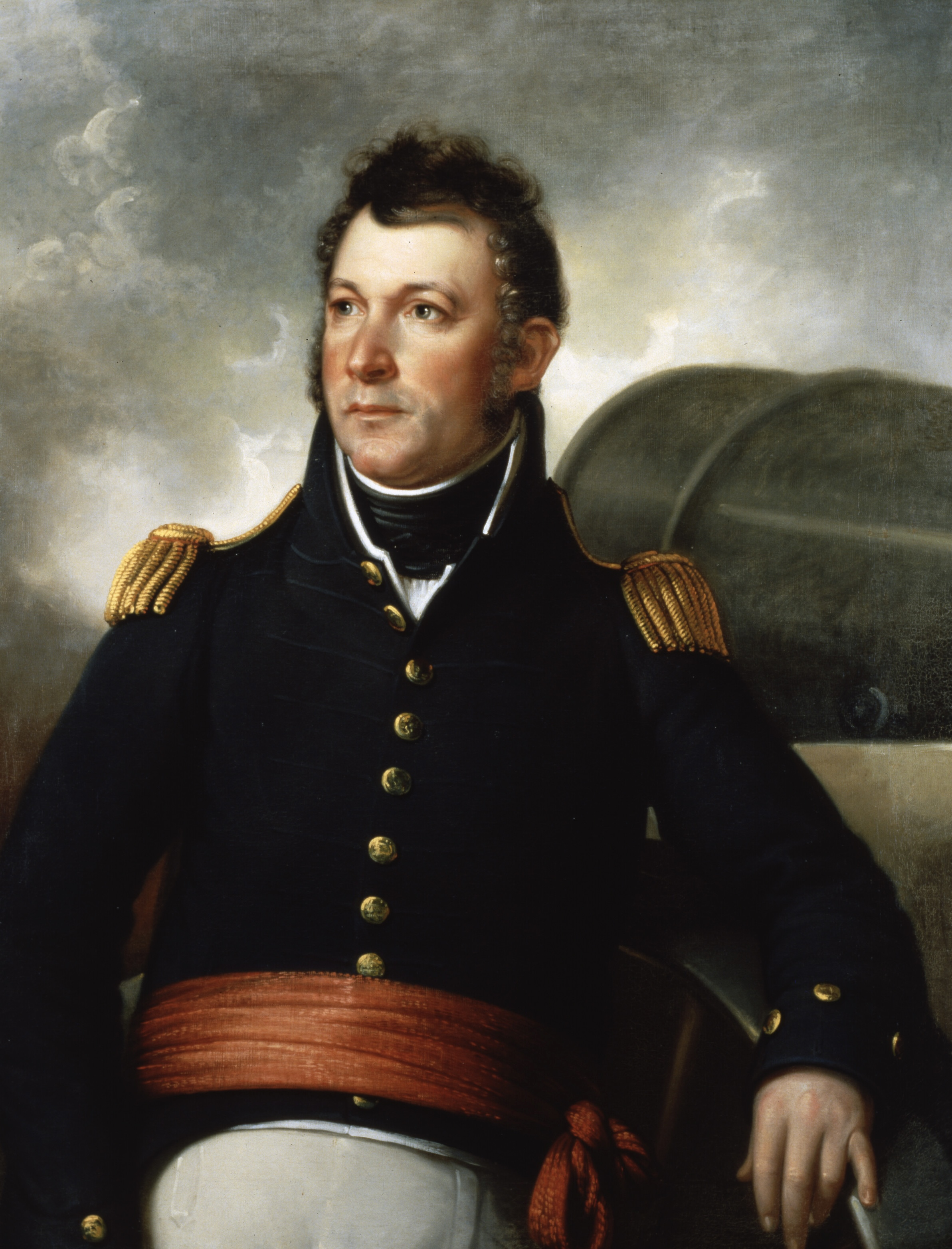
- Portrait by Rembrandt Peale, c. 1817
- Born: 10 April 1780; Newmarket plantation, Caroline County, Virginia, U.S.
- Died: 25 April 1818 (aged 38); Fort McHenry, Baltimore, Maryland, U.S.
- Relatives: Walker Keith Armistead (brother); Lewis Armistead (nephew)
- Military career
- Allegiance: United States of America
- Branch: United States Army
- Service years: 1799–1800, 1801–1818
- Rank: Brevet Lieutenant Colonel
- Commands: Fort McHenry
- Conflicts: War of 1812; Battle of Fort George; Battle of Baltimore

George Armistead (April 10, 1780 – April 25, 1818) was an American military officer, best known as the commander of Fort McHenry during the Battle of Baltimore in the War of 1812.

== Early life and education ==
Armistead was born to the former Lucinda Baylor Page and her husband John Armistead at his Newmarket Plantation in Caroline County, Virginia (now in Milford). His ancestors had emigrated from Britain to Gloucester County in the Virginia colony, and moved to what was then the frontier before the American Revolutionary War, during which they aligned with the Patriot cause. The family included five brothers, who also served as military officers during the War of 1812. John Baylor Armistead (d. after 1844) was captain of the U.S. Light Dragoons (1799-1800); William Armistead moved to Prince William County, Addison Bowles Armistead (D. Feb. 10, 1813) was lieutenant of the 7th U.S. Infantry (1799-1800) and an artillery and engineering captain after 1806, Lewis Gustavus Adlphyus Armistead would become a captain of rifleman in the Army and die Sept 17;, 1814 in a sortie from fort Erie, and Walker Keith Armstrond (1785-1845) a graduate of the U.S. Military Academy of would become a breveted brigadier general in 1828. While all five brothers served in the War of 1812, the most distinguished (besides himself) was Walker Keith Armistead, who graduated from West Point in 1803 and served for 42 years as a commissioned officer, including as the Army's chief engineer (from 1818 to 1821), then as colonel of the 3d Artillery Regiment until his death in 1845.

== Career ==
This man's military career began during the Quasi War with France, as he accepted a commission as an ensign in the 7th U.S. Infantry Regiment on January 14, 1799. Although promoted to 2nd lieutenant on March 3 of the same year and to 1st lieutenant on May 14, 1800, he was discharged from the Army on June 15, 1800 as the Quasi War ended.

However, this lapse in service lasted for less than a year, as on February 16, 1801, Armistead accepted a commission as a lieutenant in the 1st Regiment of Artillerists and Engineers. He was promoted to captain on November 1, 1806.

== War of 1812 ==
Five Armistead brothers served in the War of 1812, three in the regular army and two in the Virginia militia.

As hostilities with Britain escalated, Armistead served as an artillery officer at Fort Niagara. He was promoted to major in the 3rd Regiment of Artillery on March 3, 1813. Within months, on May 27, 1813, Armistead distinguished himself at the capture of Fort George (near the mouth of Niagara River in Canada) from the British. He would later carry the captured British flags to President James Madison. Upon his arrival in Washington, Armistead was ordered to "take command of Fort McHenry."

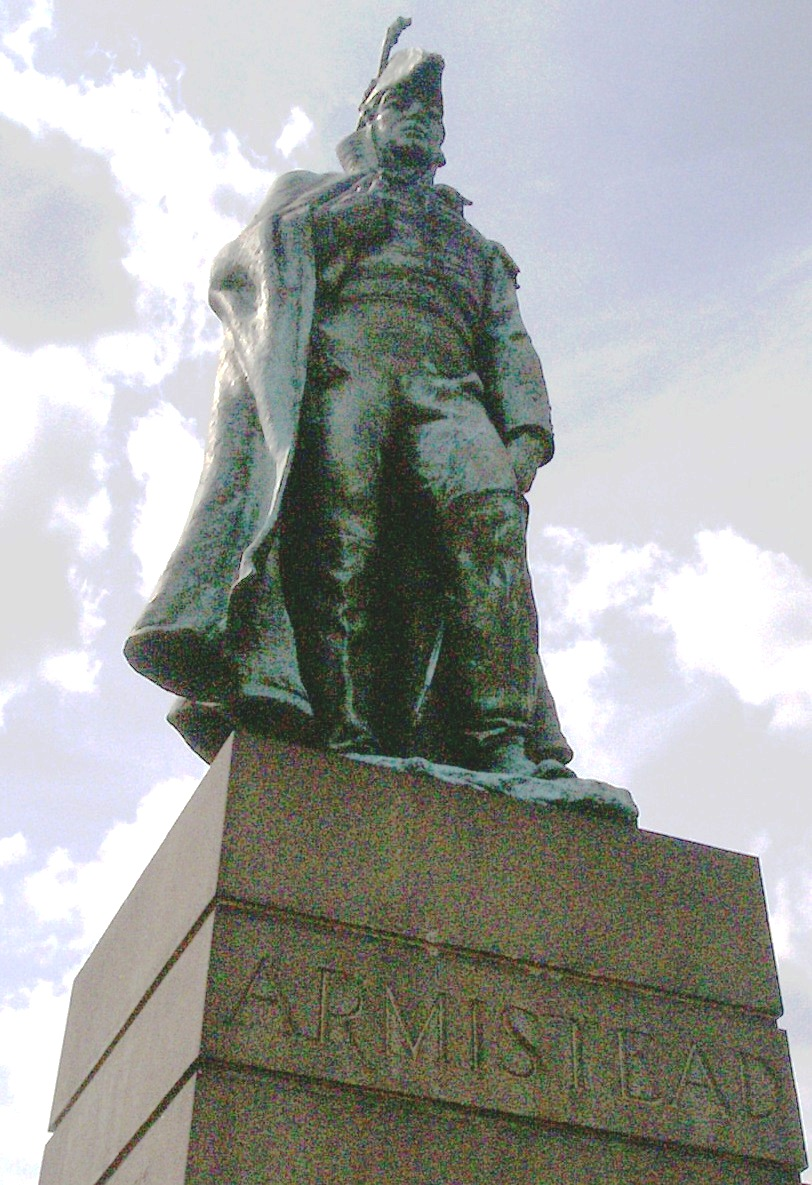
Statue of Armistead at Fort McHenry

When he arrived at Fort McHenry, located in the outer harbor of Baltimore, Maryland, Armistead ordered "a flag so large that the British would have no difficulty seeing it from a distance". That flag, known as the Star-Spangled Banner Flag, measured 42' × 30', and was made by Baltimore resident Mary Pickersgill, her daughter, and seven seamstresses, and would be later memorialized by Francis Scott Key in the poem "The Star-Spangled Banner", which became the American national anthem in 1931.

During the nearly 25-hour bombardment of Fort McHenry, commencing before dawn on September 13 until the morning of September 14, 1814, Armistead alone knew the fort's magazine was not bombproof. When a shell crashed through the roof of the magazine but failed to explode, Armistead ordered the powder barrels cleared out and placed under the rear walls of the fort. Remarkably, only four men were killed, when two shells smashed into the fort's southwest bastion, despite a deadly rain of some 2,000 mortar shells that the British bombardment fleet fired at the fort. Because the Royal Navy proved unable to capture or reduce the fort in order to enter Baltimore harbor to bombard the main American defense line east of the city, British commander-in-chief Vice Admiral Sir Alexander Cochrane wrote to British Army commander Colonel Arthur Brooke that it was up to him whether to decide to attack or withdraw. Brooke, who had taken over from Major-General Robert Ross, who was mortally wounded during the Battle of North Point on September 12, decided to withdraw. Armistead received a brevet promotion to lieutenant colonel on September 20, 1814 for his gallant services in defense of Fort McHenry.

== Personal life ==
On October 26, 1810, he married Louisa Hughes, whose grandfather had emigrated from County Wexford in Ireland, and whose mother had been born in Lancaster County, Pennsylvania. The couple had two daughters and a son and owned several enslaved people.

== Death and legacy ==
Following the battle, Armistead was soon promoted to the rank of lieutenant colonel, but was much weakened by the arduous preparations for the battle. He died at age 38, while still in command at Ft. McHenry only three years later. Historian Benson Lossing, wrote "the tax upon his nervous system during that bombardment left him with a disease of the heart ... on the 25 of April, 1818 he expired, at the age of thirty eight years." His funeral procession was described as "immense". He was buried in the graveyard of Old St. Paul's Church in Baltimore. Baltimore constructed a marble monument which overlooks the city mentioning his role in the defense of Fort McHenry, and which with a later-erected building across from the Baltimore City Hall define a plaza near the harbor. Following his death, his widow inherited the Star-Spangled Banner (the larger of two flags displayed at the historic fort during the battle), which the family said was given to Armistead following the bombardment of Fort McHenry. Not only was the flag displayed during significant events (such as Lafayette's visit to Baltimore, which happened after this man's death), his widow and later family members distributed pieces as souvenirs, damaging the historic object. Nonetheless, generations of the family treasured the flag, and unlike the smaller battle flag, it survives to this day. His grandson, Ebenezer Appleton, lent it to the Smithsonian Institution in 1907 and made the loan permanent in 1912, with provisos requiring its maintenance and display.

== Dates of rank ==
- Ensign, 7th U.S. Infantry – January 14, 1799
- 2nd lieutenant – March 3, 1799
- 1st lieutenant – May 14, 1800
- Discharged – June 15, 1800.
- 1st lieutenant, 2nd Regiment of Artillerists and Engineers – February 16, 1801
- Captain – November 1, 1806
- Major, 3rd Artillery Regiment – March 3, 1813
- Brevet Lieutenant Colonel – September 14, 1814
