= Mary Young Pickersgill =

Maker of the Star Spangled Banner Flag

Mary Pickersgill
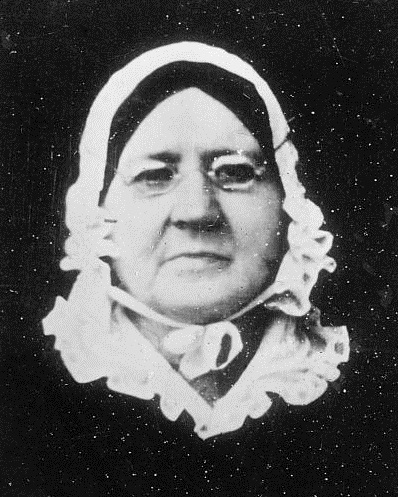
- Mary Pickersgill
- Born: Mary Young; February 12, 1776; Philadelphia, Pennsylvania, U.S.
- Died: October 4, 1857 (aged 81); Baltimore, Maryland, U.S.
- Resting place: Loudon Park Cemetery; Baltimore, Maryland, U.S.
- Occupations: Seamstress, flagmaker
- Known for: Sewing the Star-Spangled Banner
- Spouse: John Pickersgill
- Children: Caroline
- Parent(s): William Young and Rebecca Flower

Mary Pickersgill (born Mary Young; February 12, 1776 – October 4, 1857) was an American seamstress who is known as the maker of the Star-Spangled Banner hoisted over Fort McHenry during the Battle of Baltimore in the War of 1812. The daughter of another noted flag maker, Rebecca Young, Pickersgill learned her craft from her mother, and in 1813 she was commissioned by Major George Armistead to make a flag for Baltimore's Fort McHenry that was so large that the British would have no difficulty seeing it from a great distance. The flag was installed in August 1813 and, during the Battle of Baltimore a year later, Francis Scott Key could see the flag while negotiating a prisoner exchange aboard a British vessel and was inspired to pen the words that became the United States National Anthem in 1931.

Pickersgill, widowed at age 29, became successful enough in her flag-making business that in 1820 she was able to buy the house that she had been renting in Baltimore, and later she became active in addressing social issues, such as housing and employment for disadvantaged women. From 1828 to 1851, she was president of the Impartial Female Humane Society which had been founded in 1802 and incorporated in 1811, and helped impoverished families with school vouchers for children and employment for women. Under Pickersgill's leadership, this organization built a home for aged women and later added an Aged Men's Home which was built adjacent to it. These, more than a century later, evolved into the Pickersgill Retirement Community of Towson, Maryland, which opened in 1959.

Pickersgill died in 1857 and was buried in the Loudon Park Cemetery in southwest Baltimore, where her daughter erected a monument for her, and where some civic-minded organizations later erected a bronze plaque. The house where Pickersgill lived for 50 years, at the northwest corner of Albemarle and East Pratt Streets in downtown Baltimore, became known as the Star-Spangled Banner Flag House in 1927. The house was saved through the efforts of many preservation-minded citizens who were motivated by the Centennial Celebrations of 1914.

== Early life ==
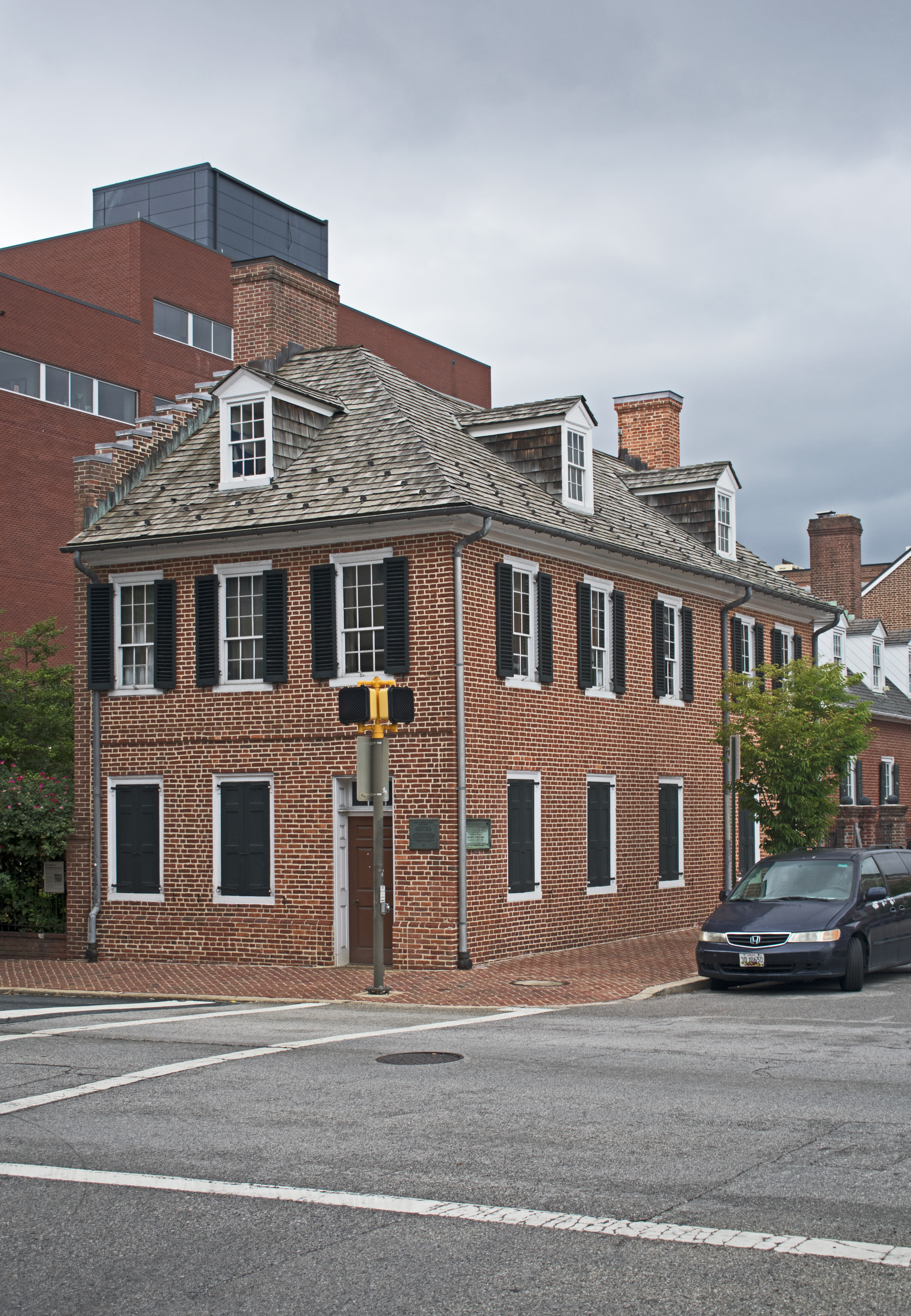
The Star-Spangled Banner Flag House

Mary Young was born in Philadelphia, Pennsylvania, on February 12, 1776, the youngest of the six children of William Young and Rebecca Flower. Her mother, who became widowed when Mary was two years old, had a flag shop on Walnut Street in Philadelphia where she made ensigns, garrison flags and "Continental Colors" for the Continental Army. Her 1781 advertisement in the "Pennsylvania Packet" read, "All kinds of colours, for the Army and Navy, made and sold on the most reasonable Terms, By Rebecca Young." Young moved her family to Baltimore, Maryland, when Mary was a child, and it was from her mother that Mary learned the craft of flag making.

On October 2, 1795, at age 19, Mary married John Pickersgill, a merchant, and moved back to Philadelphia with him. Of Mary's four children, only one survived childhood, a daughter named Caroline. Mary's husband traveled to London to work for the United States government in the British Claims Office, but died in London on June 14, 1805, leaving Mary widowed at age 29. In 1807 Mary moved back to Baltimore with her daughter Caroline and 67-year-old mother Rebecca.

The small family rented a house at 44 Queen Street (later 844 East Pratt Street, which became the Star Spangled Banner Flag House and 1812 Museum), where Pickersgill took in boarders and opened a flag-making business, selling "silk standards, cavalry and division colours of every description." Her customers included the United States Army, United States Navy, and visiting merchant ships.

== The Fort McHenry flag ==
The Star-Spangled Banner

In 1813 the United States was at war with Great Britain, and Baltimore was preparing for an eventual attack as the fleet of the British Royal Navy had complete maritime control of the Chesapeake Bay. Major George Armistead, the U.S. Army commander of the infantry and artillery units that defended Fort McHenry in Baltimore, felt that the fort was prepared for an attack, except it lacked a flag. In a letter to the head of the Maryland Militia and military commander for Baltimore, Major General Samuel Smith, he wrote, "We, sir, are ready at Fort McHenry to defend Baltimore against invading by the enemy. That is to say, we are ready except that we have no suitable ensign to display over the Star Fort and it is my desire to have a flag so large that the British will have no difficulty seeing it from a distance." A delegation consisting of Armistead, Smith, Brig. General John Stricker, and Commodore Joshua Barney, Pickersgill's brother-in-law, visited with Pickersgill, and discussed the particulars of the desired flag. They commissioned Pickersgill to make two flags, "one American ensign, 30 X 42 feet, first quality bunting" and another flag 17 by 25 feet."

In early summer 1813, she began the job, and, as a task as large as the making of these flags was beyond the capability of one person to complete, Pickersgill not only drew on members of her own household for help including her daughter Caroline; her two nieces, Eliza and Margaret Young, and likely her elderly mother, Rebecca Young; an apprenticing indentured servant, Grace Wisher; and also contracted labor from the immediate neighborhood. An additional unnamed African American who boarded in the house is also listed as helping in some sources, as were additional local seamstresses who were hired during the summer. Often working late into the evening, until midnight at times, Pickersgill's team was able to complete the job in six weeks. Pickersgill's daughter, in an 1876 letter to Georgiana Armistead Appleton, the daughter of Major Armistead (later breveted a lieutenant colonel), wrote these particulars about the flag:

The flag being so very large, mother was obliged to obtain permission from the proprietors of Claggetts [sic] brewery which was in our neighborhood, to spread it out in their malt house; and I remember seeing my mother down on the floor, placing the stars: after the completion of the flag, she superintended the topping of it, having it fastened in the most secure manner to prevent its being torn away by (cannon) balls: the wisdom of her precaution was shown during the engagement: many shots piercing it, but it still remained firm to the staff. Your father (Col. Armistead) declared that no one but the maker of the flag should mend it, and requested that the rents should merely be bound around.

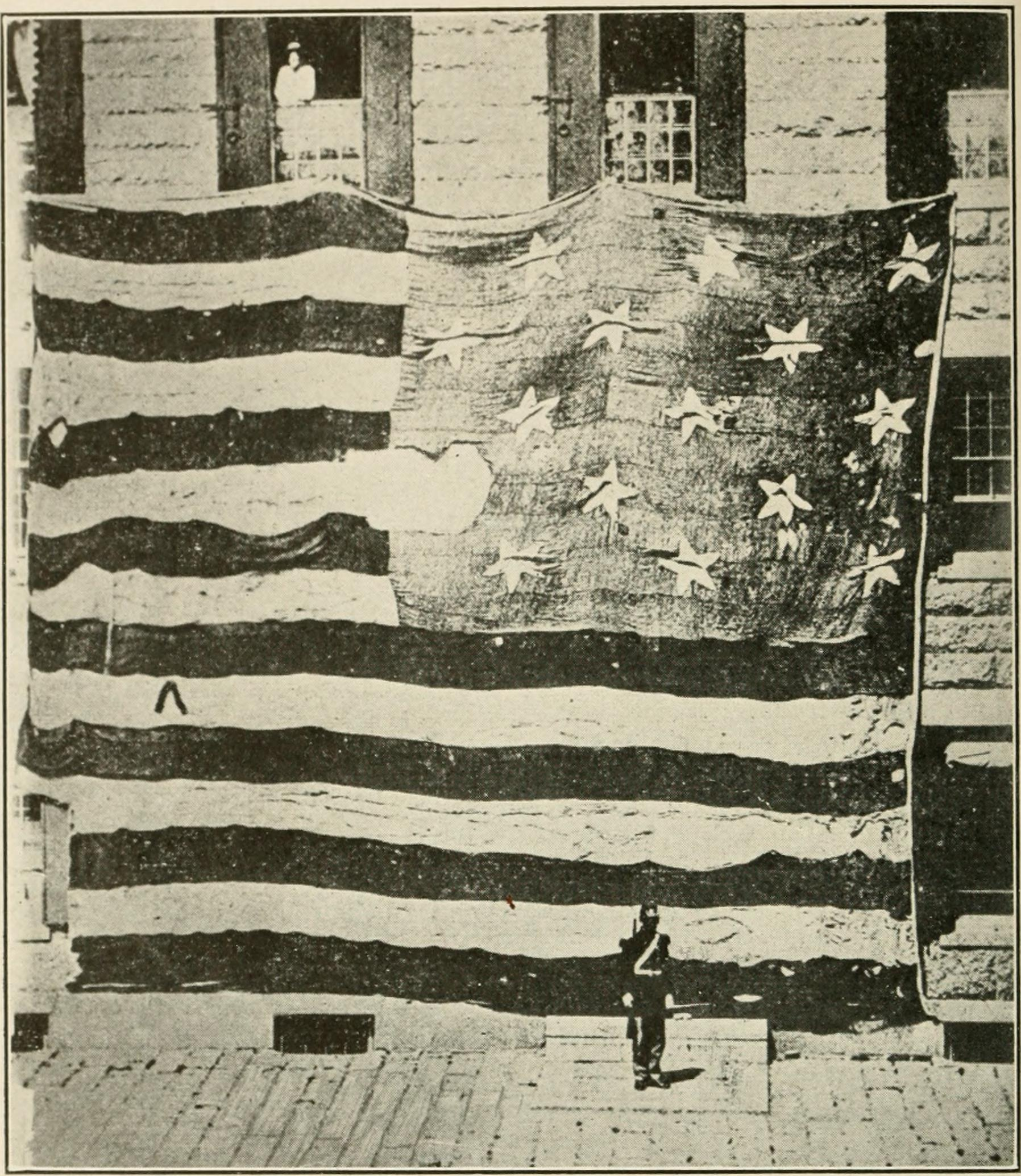
Pickersgill's Star Spangled Banner Flag displayed in 1873 at the Boston Navy Yard

The large flag contained over 400 yards (370 meters) of fabric, and included 15 stripes and 15 stars, one for each of the 15 states of the union. The stars were made of cotton and the stripes and blue canton were of English wool bunting. Each stripe was two feet (61 cm) wide and each of the stars measured 24 inches (61 cm) across from tip to tip. The women did much of the work in the evening after the brewery closed, sometimes working until midnight, and Pickersgill delivered the flags to Fort McHenry on August 19, 1813, a full year before the Battle of Baltimore.

The main flag weighed about 50 pounds (23 kg), and it took 11 men to raise it onto a 90-foot (27 m) flagpole. The result was an enormous American flag that could be seen for several miles from the Fort. On October 27, 1813 a receipt was given to Pickersgill and her niece Eliza Young in the amount of $405.90 for the larger flag, and $168.54 for the smaller one (which was also used at Fort McHenry as a storm flag). The small flag may have been flying when the British initially attacked Fort McHenry during the Battle of Baltimore on September 13, because of the inclement weather that night with the driving rainstorm (which would have made the woolen bunting material soggy and too heavy to blow out in any breeze). However, it was Pickersgill's large flag that was flying over the fort at daybreak on September 14, 1814, after the British had ceased firing on the fort. A diary entry from a British sub-altern on board ship and recently returned from the North Point battlefield, George Glebe, described that sunny morning when the Americans at the distant fort "fired their ("wake-up") morning gun salute and raised a splendid ensign" over the battlements. While negotiating a prisoner exchange aboard a British ship, Francis Scott Key saw the flag, and this inspired him to pen the words to the poem "The Defence of Fort McHenry" that later became the national anthem of the United States in 1931.

After the 1814 battle, George Armistead took possession of the large flag, and after his death in 1818 his widow, Louisa Hughes Armistead, kept it. During her four decades of ownership, she allowed it to be displayed on a few occasions, and also removed pieces of it to be given as gifts, a common practice of the day. Following her death in 1861 the flag went to her daughter, Georgiana Armistead Appleton, and later to her grandson, Eben Appleton. The flag was moved to various locations over a 40-year period until 1907 when Eben Appleton loaned it to the Smithsonian. In 1912 the loan became permanent, and the flag underwent a variety of restorations. Beginning in December 1998, the flag began an $18 million conservation treatment (not a restoration) and now this flag that was hand crafted by Pickersgill and her helpers in 1813 is one of the most important artifacts, and the centerpiece of the redesigned National Museum of American History.

== Later life ==
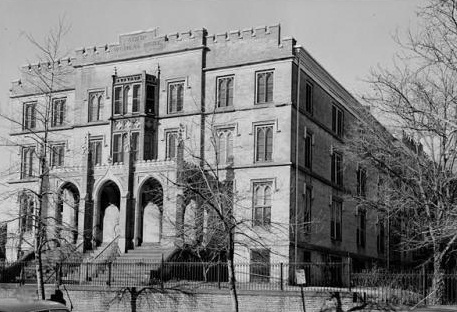
Impartial Female Humane Society's home, opened under Pickersgill's presidency

By 1820 Pickersgill had become sufficiently successful in her business to purchase the house she had been renting, and she lived there for the remainder of her life. Her business success allowed her to become active in addressing social issues, such as housing, job placement, and financial aid for disadvantaged women, decades before these issues became prominent concerns in society. The Impartial Female Humane Society had been established to help needy Baltimore families with educating their children, and to help destitute women find employment. Pickersgill served as the president of this society from 1828 to 1851, and under her presidency a home for aged women was finally opened in West Baltimore in 1851 after a long planning and construction process. Following her tenure as president, a home for aged men was then established adjacent to the women's home in 1869. In 1959 the two homes were combined and moved from west Baltimore to Towson, Maryland, and in 1962 the new facility was named the "Pickersgill Retirement Community" in honor of the woman who had been instrumental in its creation.

Pickersgill died on October 4, 1857, and is buried in Loudon Park Cemetery in southwest Baltimore. Her daughter Caroline erected a monument for her, and later the genealogical heritage organization United States Daughters of 1812 and the Star Spangled Banner Flag House Association, which had organized to save and preserve the Flag House in 1927, placed a bronze plaque at the foot of her grave.

== Legacy ==
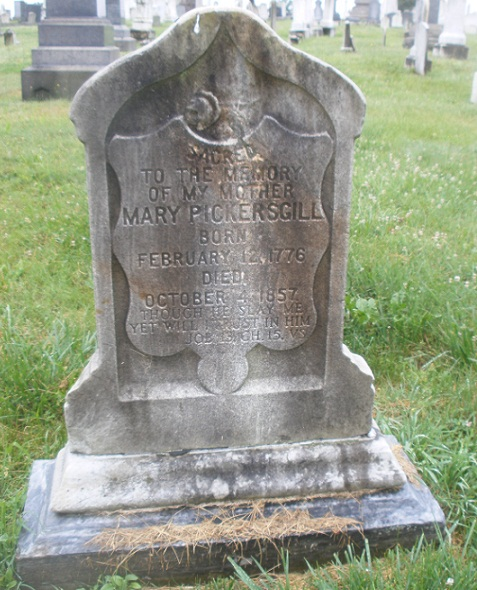
Pickersgill's grave marker, Loudon Park Cemetery, Baltimore

Besides making the flag that inspired Francis Scott Key to compose the words to the United States National Anthem, Pickersgill is also remembered for her humanitarian contributions to society, evident in her decades-long presidency of the Impartial Female Humane Society, which eventually evolved into the Pickersgill Retirement Community of Towson, Maryland. She is also remembered for her house, known as the Star-Spangled Banner Flag House and later renamed the Flag House and Star-Spangled Banner Museum, which stands at the corner of East Pratt Street and Albemarle Street in eastern downtown Baltimore and is a National Historic Landmark.

About the time of the American Bicentennial, noted artist Robert McGill Mackall created a painting depicting Mary Pickersgill and her helpers in the malt house of a brewery, sewing the "Star-Spangled Banner". A copy of the painting is maintained by the Maryland Historical Society.

Mary Pickersgill was the namesake of a World War II Liberty ship, the SS "Mary Pickersgill", launched in 1944. In addition, a type of flower is known as the Mary Pickersgill rose.

Concerning Pickersgill's famous flag, In 1998, I. Michael Heyman, Secretary of the Smithsonian Institution wrote:

I am often asked which of our more than 140 million objects is our greatest treasure, our most valued possession. Of all the questions asked of me, this is the easiest to answer: our greatest treasure is, of course, the Star-Spangled Banner.

— I. Michael Heyman, Smithsonian Institution Secretary

== Family ==
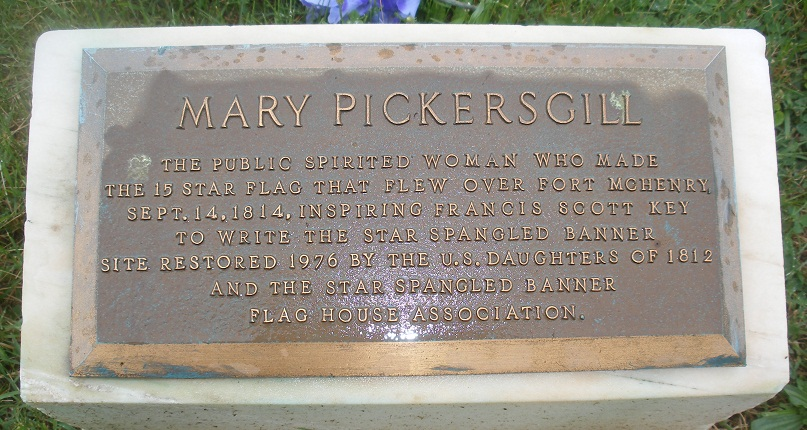
Plaque at foot of Pickersgill's grave, Loudon Park Cemetery

Pickersgill's uncle, Colonel Benjamin Flower, fought during the American Revolutionary War, and was presented a sword by General George Washington, commander of the Continental Army. The presentation was made for Flower's masterful evacuation of Philadelphia during the British occupation of that city, the first American capital, in late 1776.

Of Pickersgill's five siblings, her oldest brother, William Young, was also a flag maker, and it is likely that his two daughters were Pickersgill's nieces that assisted in making the Star Spangled Banner flag. Her sister, Hannah Young, married Captain Jesse Fearson, a privateer ship commander during the War of 1812 who was captured by the British and imprisoned in Havana, Cuba, before later escaping.

Pickersgill's one surviving child, Caroline (1800-1884), married John Purdy (1795-1837). The couple apparently had no surviving children, because in a letter written late in her life to the daughter of George Armistead, Purdy called herself "widowed and childless." She had become somewhat destitute late in life, and in the same letter requested some financial assistance, but also provided some history about her mother and the making of the Star-Spangled Banner flag.

== See also ==
- Flags of the United States
- Brown's Brewery
- History of Maryland
- Baltimore
- History of Baltimore
- Timeline of Baltimore history
