= Star-Spangled Banner (flag) =

Flag that flew over Fort McHenry in Baltimore during the War of 1812

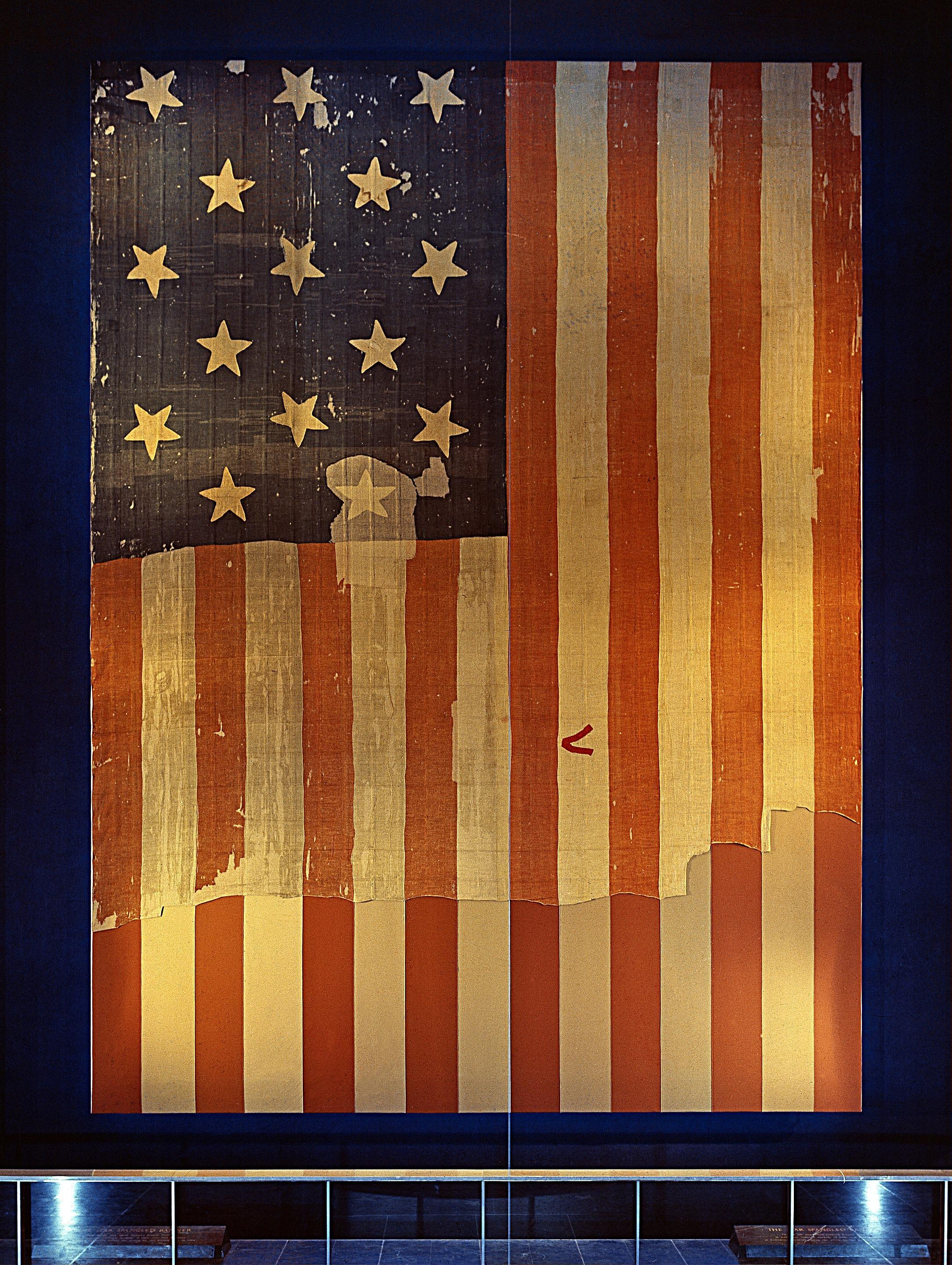
Star-Spangled Banner flag on display at the Smithsonian's National Museum of American History, c. 1964

Digital recreation of the Star-Spangled Banner

The Star-Spangled Banner, or the Great Garrison Flag, was the garrison flag that flew over Fort McHenry in Baltimore Harbor during the naval portion of the Battle of Baltimore during the War of 1812. It is on exhibit at the National Museum of American History, Smithsonian Institution. Seeing the flag flying over Fort McHenry on the morning of September 14, 1814, after the battle ended, Francis Scott Key was inspired to write the poem "Defence of Fort M'Henry". These words were then set to the tune of "To Anacreon in Heaven", a popular song at the time, by John Stafford Smith. In 1931, the song became the national anthem of the United States.

More broadly, a garrison flag is a U.S. Army term for an extra-large national flag that is flown on Sundays, holidays, and special occasions. The U.S. Navy term is "holiday colors".

With fifteen stripes, the Star-Spangled Banner remains the only official American flag to bear more than thirteen stripes.

== Description ==
The flag was stitched from a combination of cotton and dyed English wool bunting. It has fifteen horizontal red and white stripes, as well as fifteen white stars in the blue field. The two additional stars and stripes, approved by the United States Congress's Flag Act of 1794, represent Vermont and Kentucky's entrance into the Union. The stars are arranged in vertical rows, with five horizontal rows of stars, offset, each containing three stars. At the time, the practice of adding stripes (in addition to stars) with the induction of a new state had not yet been discontinued.

The flag originally measured 30 by 42 feet (9.1 by 12.8 m) and weighed about 50 pounds (23 kg). Each of the fifteen stripes is 2 feet (0.61 m) wide, and each of the stars measures about 2 feet (0.61 m) in diameter. Several feet of fabric have been lost from the flag's fly end, from cuttings that were given away as souvenirs and gifts, as well as from deterioration from continued use. It now measures 30 by 34 feet (9.1 by 10.4 m). The flag currently has only fourteen stars—the fifteenth star was similarly given as a gift, but its recipient and current whereabouts are unknown.

A red patch shaped like a capital A was reportedly sewn onto the flag by Louisa Armistead, widow of the commander of Fort McHenry," according to the Smithsonian.

== History ==
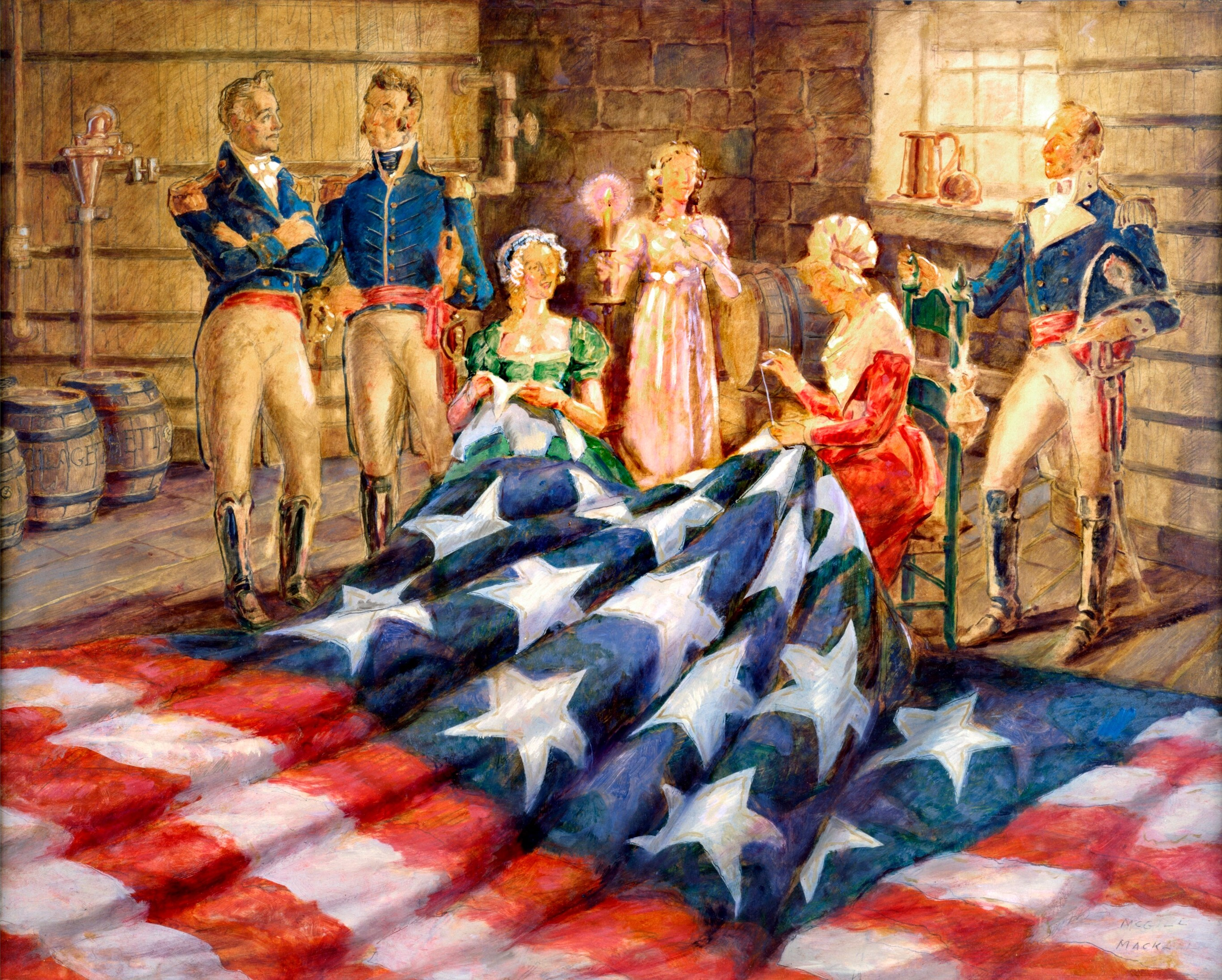
Mary Pickersgill and her nieces sewing the flag at Brown's Brewery. Artist's rendition by Robert McGill Mackall, 1962.

In Baltimore's preparation for an expected attack on the city, Fort McHenry was made ready to defend the city's harbor. When Major George Armistead, the fort's commander, expressed the desire for a very large flag to fly over the fort, General John S. Stricker and Commodore Joshua Barney placed an order for two oversized American flags. The larger of the two flags would be the Great Garrison Flag, the largest battle flag ever flown at the time. The smaller of the two flags would be the Storm Flag, to be more durable and less prone to fouling in inclement weather.

The flag was sewn by prominent Baltimorean flagmaker Mary Young Pickersgill under a government commission in 1813 at a cost of $405.90 (equivalent to $6,771 in 2025). Armistead specified "a flag so large that the British would have no difficulty seeing it from a distance".

Pickersgill made the flag with assistance from her daughter, two nieces, and an African American indentured servant, Grace Wisher.

=== Battle ===
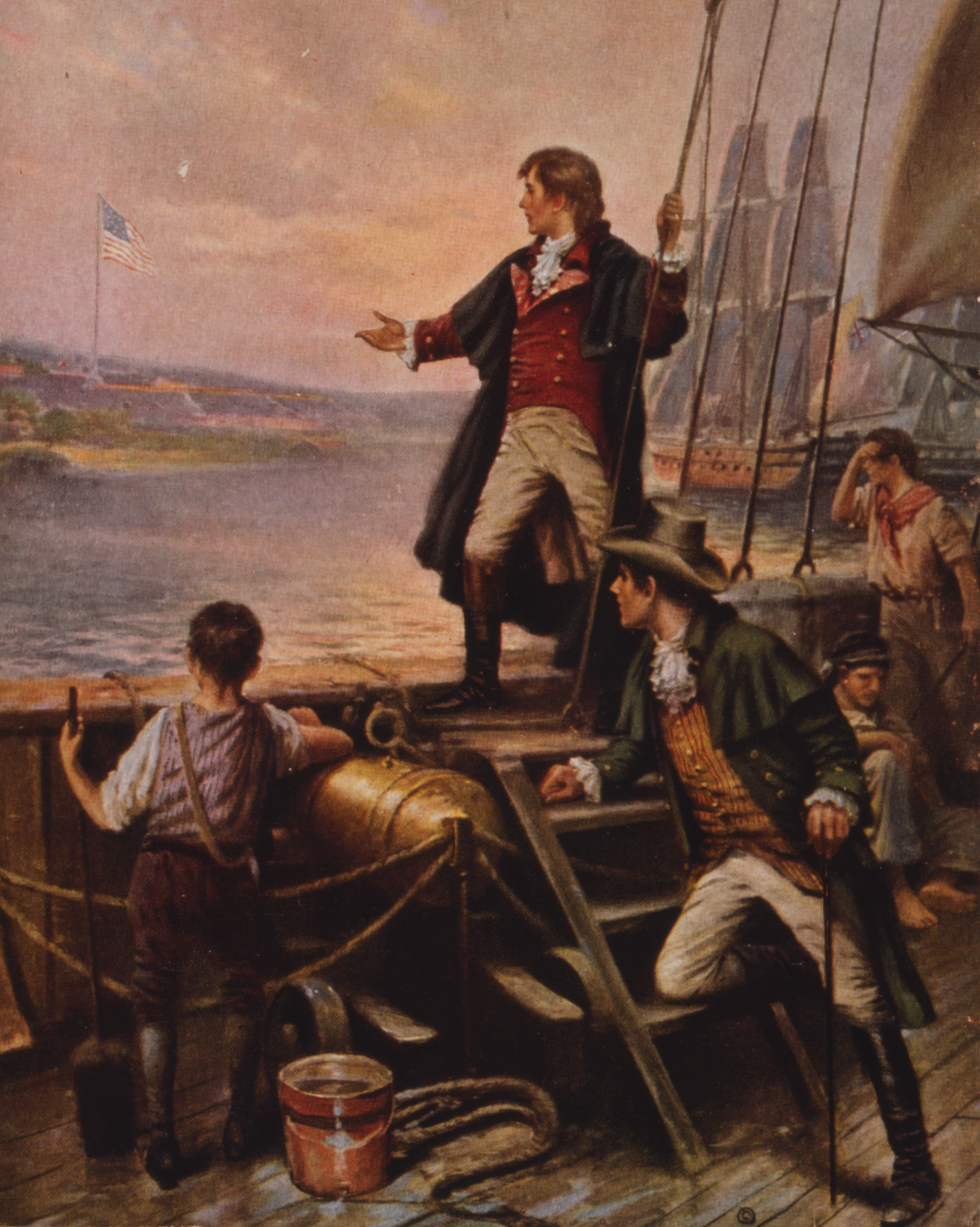
Francis Scott Key observing the flag on the morning after the battle. Artist's rendition by Edward Percy Moran, 1913.

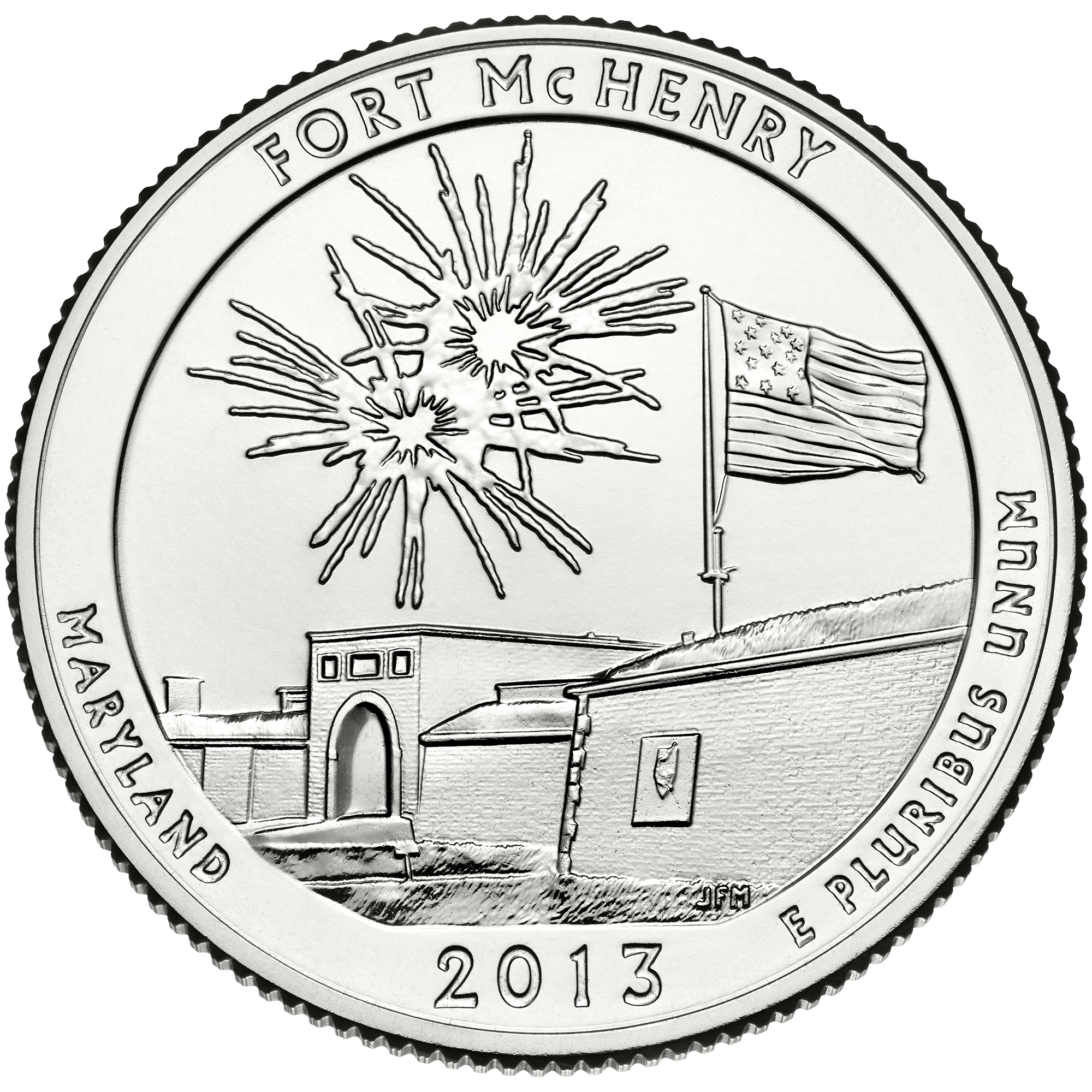
The fort and the banner depicted on a 2013 America the Beautiful quarter

On September 12, 1814, 5,000 British soldiers and a fleet of 19 ships attacked Baltimore. The bombardment turned to Fort McHenry on the morning of September 13, and continuous shelling occurred for 25 hours under heavy rain. When the British ships were unable to pass the fort and penetrate the harbor, the attack was ended.

There is conflicting evidence as to which flag, the larger garrison flag or the smaller storm flag, flew over the fort during the battle. Historians suggest that the storm flag flew through the night, and the garrison flag was hoisted in the morning, after the British retreated.

On the morning of September 14, when the flag was seen flying above the ramparts, it was clear that Fort McHenry remained in American hands. This revelation was famously captured in poetry by Francis Scott Key, an American lawyer and amateur poet. Being held by the British on a truce ship in the Patapsco River, Key observed the battle from afar. When he saw the garrison flag flying in the morning, he composed a poem he originally titled "Defence of Fort McHenry." The poem would be put to the music of a common tune, retitled "The Star-Spangled Banner", and a portion of it would later be adopted as the national anthem of the United States.

=== Armistead family ===
After the battle, the flag came into the possession of Major Armistead. How and when this occurred is unclear. Upon his death in 1818, the flag passed to his widow, Louisa Hughes Armistead.

Louisa occasionally allowed the flag to be used for civic occasions. It was flown at Fort McHenry in 1824 at a reception for the Marquis de Lafayette during his tour of America. Some years, it was flown at Baltimore's celebration of Defenders Day, the anniversary of the battle. It reportedly decorated the hall of the Baltimore Athenaeum during a memorial service for Lafayette in 1834. It was displayed outside Armistead's son's home for the 1844 Whig National Convention.

The Armisteads' daughter, Georgiana Armistead Appleton, inherited the flag upon her mother's death in 1861.

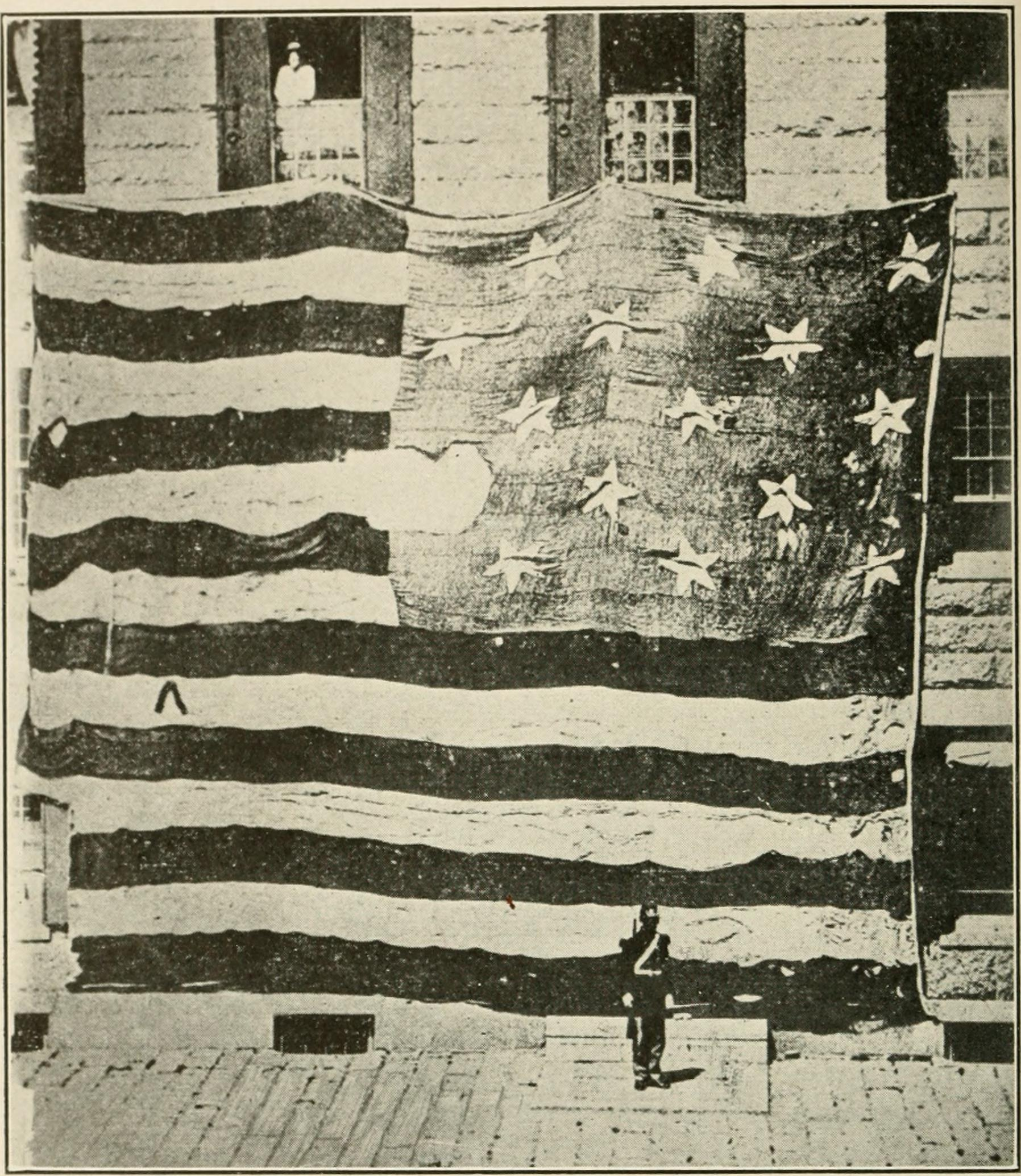
The flag photographed in 1873 in the Boston Navy Yard by George Henry Preble

In 1873, Appleton lent the flag to George Henry Preble, a naval officer who had written a popular history of the American flag. Preble had the flag quilted to a canvas sail, and unfurled it at the Boston Navy Yard to take the first known photograph of it. He then put the flag on display at the headquarters of the New England Historic Genealogical Society for several weeks. It was then kept in the Society's vault until 1876, when it was taken to the vault of the Historical Society of Pennsylvania. It was intended to be exhibited at the Philadelphia Centennial Exhibition, but was not displayed because of fears it would be damaged.

In 1877, the flag was exhibited at the Old South Church in Boston for the nation's first Flag Day celebration.

Georgiana Appleton died in 1878 and left the flag to her son, Eben Appleton.

Eben Appleton was highly protective of the flag and disliked the attention it brought him. For the next 29 years, he allowed it to be displayed only once, in 1880, when it was paraded through the streets of Baltimore for the city's sesquicentennial celebration.

The Armistead family occasionally gave away pieces of the flag as souvenirs and gifts.

== Smithsonian National Museum of American History ==
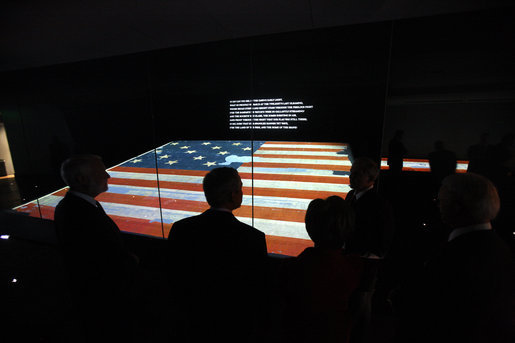
President George W. Bush (center) observes the flag upon its unveiling at the reopening of the National Museum of American History in 2008

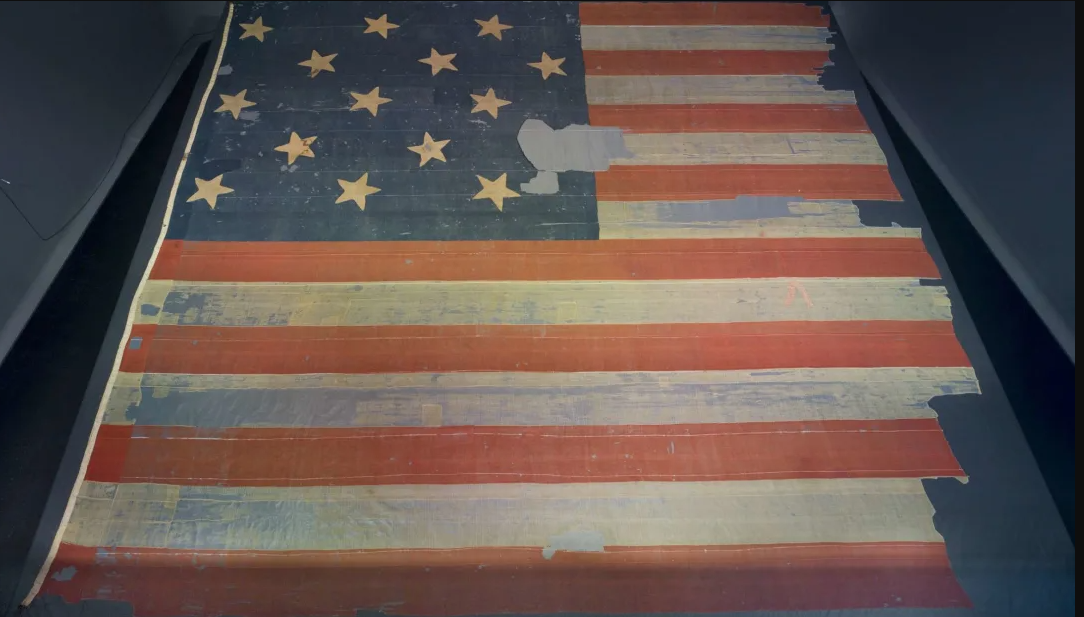
The flag in its display

The flag that flew during that episode in history became a significant artifact. Today it is permanently housed in the National Museum of American History, one of the Smithsonian Institution museums on the National Mall in Washington, D.C.

In 1907, Eben Appleton lent the flag to the Smithsonian, and it was put on display at the National Museum (now the Arts and Industries Building). In 1912, Appleton formally donated it to the Smithsonian. The flag was restored by Amelia Fowler in 1914.

During World War II, from 1942 to 1944, the flag, along with many other objects in the Smithsonian's collection, was kept for safekeeping at a warehouse at Shenandoah National Park.

In 1964, the flag was moved across the National Mall to the newly opened Museum of History and Technology (now the National Museum of American History). It was hung in Flag Hall, a three-story central atrium designed for this purpose.

A conservation effort was undertaken in 1982 to protect the flag from damage due to dust and light. Years of accumulated dust were carefully vacuumed from the front and back of the flag. An opaque curtain was installed in front of it, allowing visitors to view the flag only for one minute, twice an hour, when the curtain was lowered.

Due to environmental and light damage, a four-phase restoration project began in May 1999. In the first phase, the team removed the linen support backing that was attached to the flag during the 1914 restoration. The second phase consisted of the most comprehensive, detailed examination of the condition and construction of the Star-Spangled Banner to date, which provided critical information for later work. This included scientific studies with infrared spectrometry, electron microscopy, mechanical testing, and determination of amino acid content by a New Zealand scientist, and infrared imaging by a NASA scientist. Planning and executing a cleaning treatment for the flag following scientific analysis was the third phase. In the fourth and final phase of the project, curators, scientists, and conservators developed a long-term preservation plan. The restoration was completed in 2008 at a total cost in excess of $21 million.

Following the reopening of the museum on November 21, 2008, the flag is now on display in a two-story display chamber that allows it to lie at a 10-degree angle in dim light. The Smithsonian has created a permanent exhibition to document the flag's history and significance, called "The Star-Spangled Banner: The Flag that Inspired the National Anthem". Visitors are allowed a clear view of the flag, while it remains protected in a controlled environment.

The National Museum of American History produced an online exhibition in conjunction with the reopening of Flag Hall in 2008. An interactive component allows site visitors to closely explore features of the flag in detail, download an audio-descriptive tour of the exhibition for the visually-impaired, and hear the song performed on original instruments from the National Museum of American History's collection.

== Fragments ==
A 2-inch by 5-inch fragment of the flag—white and red, with a seam down the middle—was sold at auction in Dallas, Texas, on November 30, 2011, for $38,837: the snippet was, presumably, cut from the famous flag as a souvenir in the mid-19th century. The framed remnant came with a faded, hand-written note attesting it was "A piece of the Flag which floated over Fort McHenry at the time of the bombardment when Key's [sic] composed the Song of the Star Spangled Banner, presented by Sam Beth Cohen."

== See also ==
- Flags of the United States
