= Bradley McCallum =

American artist (born 1966)

Bradley H. McCallum
- Born: August 2, 1966 (age 60); Green Bay, WI
- Education: Master of Fine Arts in Sculpture
- Alma mater: Yale University
- Notable work: Weights and Measures, Whitewash, Wade in the Water, Endurance
- Style: Visual Art
- Website: mccallumtarry.com

Bradley McCallum (born August 2, 1966) is an American conceptual artist and social activist. He is best known for his large-scale, site-specific installations made in collaboration with artist Jacqueline Tarry, with whom he has worked since 1999 in the mixed-race collaborative McCallum + Tarry.

He is the Founding Director of Conjunction Arts, a Brooklyn-based nonprofit that supports artists by connecting them to social justice organizations and providing fiscal sponsorship to individual artists. From March 2014 to March 2015 he worked as the artist-in-residence at the Coalition for the International Criminal Court, where he developed a portrait project called Weights and Measures and started the Arts Initiative for International Justice. In 1998, he held a similar residency at the New York Civil Liberties Union, where he developed a project exploring police brutality. He works from his studio in Fort Greene, Brooklyn.

== McCallum + Tarry ==
Since 1999, McCallum has worked with artist Jacqueline Tarry in the collaborative McCallum + Tarry. He is European American and she is African American; together their work addresses social inequality in the United States, including homelessness, police brutality, and legacies of racial discrimination.

== Selected solo work ==
McCallum also continues to make solo work.

=== Weights and Measures, 2014-2015 ===
Portrait of Thomas Lubanga in the series Weights and Measures

In November 2012, McCallum began creating a body of portraits depicting defendants standing trial before international courts titled Weights and Measures. He began this project in partnership with the Coalition for the International Criminal Court as the organization's year-long artist-in-residence. The project consists of oil paintings portraying individuals standing trial before the International Criminal Court, as well as the ad hoc international tribunals that preceded it, such as the Special Court for Sierra Leone, the Extraordinary Chambers in the Courts of Cambodia, the International Criminal Tribunal for Rwanda, and the International Criminal Tribunal for the former Yugoslavia. According to an interview with MSNBC, the paintings are monumental formal portraits, referring to a classical, 19th-century approach to portraiture. They challenge viewers to reconsider the harmful influence the powerful male subjects of these portraits had on their communities.

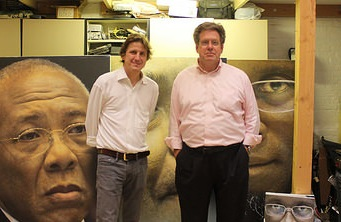
McCallum standing with William Pace, the Convener of the Coalition for the International Criminal Court, in Conjunction Arts studio in Brooklyn

McCallum has completed painted portraits of Thomas Lubanga, Slobodan Milošević, Radovan Karadžić, Germain Katanga, Kang Kek Iew, Nuon Chea, William Ruto, Charles Taylor, Jean-Pierre Bemba, and Fidèle Wandu.

=== The Manhole Cover Project: A Gun Legacy, 1996 ===
Before the formation of the McCallum + Tarry partnership, McCallum produced several major solo works. Among the most notable is The Manhole Cover Project, a community-based public art project commissioned by the Wadsworth Atheneum and the Childhood Injury Prevention Center of Hartford, Connecticut. The artwork explored the unique role of the gun and gun violence in the history of Hartford. The city is both the site of the original manufacturing plants of the Colt family, which were important to its economy and, because of issues related to current poverty and drug use, has suffered some of the highest rates of gun-related deaths in the United States. The project consists of 228 manhole covers cast from the melted metal of 11,194 guns confiscated by the Hartford police force from January 1, 1992 to July 31, 1996. McCallum emblazoned each manhole cover with the words "MADE FROM 172 LBS OF YOUR CONFISCATED GUNS" and the common epitaph "VINCIT QUI PATITUR," which roughly translated can mean either "he who perseveres is victorious" or "he who suffers conquers." The juxtaposition of the declaration of ownership with the Latin phrase, which was also the Colt family motto, contrasts Hartford's collective responsibility for current gun violence with its history of gun manufacturing. The complete project, which included recordings of local student testimony, was curated by James Rondeau and installed at the Wadsworth Atheneum in Hartford.

== Conjunction Arts ==
In 1989, McCallum started Conjunction Arts, a non-profit arts organization to support politically and socially engaged artists through fiscal sponsorship, professional development, and residency connections with social justice organizations. In 2014, Conjunction Arts partnered with the Coalition for the International Criminal Court to launch the Arts Initiative for International Justice, a unique program to connect politically and socially engaged artists to leaders in the fields of policy, diplomacy, and human rights.

McCallum curated the first exhibition for the Arts Initiative, a travelling group show titled Post Conflict that included work by prominent artists Ai Weiwei, Richard Mosse, Alfredo Jaar, Jenny Holzer, Adam Pendleton, Pieter Hugo, Lana Mesic, Daapo Reo, and a selection of African cartoonists by Creative Court. Kinz+Tillou Fine Arts in Brooklyn, New York hosted the exhibition from November 2014 to February 2015, and Nichido Contemporary Art in Tokyo, Japan hosted it from March to May, 2015. One critic described the traveling exhibition as bringing together artists "who challenge us to examine complex and layered political issues and prompt us to consider how these issues impact others through artwork that humanizes and transforms."

== Awards and residencies ==
- 2014-15: Residency, The Coalition for the International Criminal Court, New York City & The Hague
- 2012: Painting fellowship, New York Foundation for the Arts
- 2008: Video fellowship, New York Foundation for the Arts
- 2008: Residency, Tokyo Wonder Site Aoyama, Tokyo, Japan
- 2006: Residency, McColl Center, Charlotte, NC
- 2004-06: Lambent Fellowship in the Arts, Tides Foundation, New York, NY
- 1999: Institute on the Arts and Civic Dialogue, Harvard University, Boston, MA
- 1998–99: New York Civil Liberties Union, New York, NY
- 1996: Philip C. Curtis residency, Albion College, Albion, MI
- 1995: John Michael Kohler Arts Center residency, Sheboygan, Wisconsin

== Solo exhibitions (including works with Tarry) ==
- Feb 2013: In Latitudes Where Storms Are Born, Greenfield Community College Gallery, MA
- Sep-Jan 2012-13: Intersections: McCallum & Tarry, Burchfield Penny Art Center, Buffalo, NY
- Jul 2012: Wade in the Water, Galerie Nordine Zidoun, Luxembourg
- Sep 2010: Evenly Yoked: Bradley McCallum & Jacqueline Tarry, Spelman College, Atlanta GA
- May 2010: Bearing Witness: Work by Bradley McCallum & Jacqueline Tarry, Contemporary Museum Baltimore, Maryland Institute College of Art, The Walters Art Museum, Carroll Mansion, Phoenix Shot Tower, Reginald F. Lewis Museum of Maryland African American History & Culture, Maryland Art Place, Baltimore, MD
- May 2009: Shades of Black, Galerie Nordine Zidoun, Luxembourg
- Oct 2008: Within Our Gates, Irwin Street Water Tower, Atlanta, Georgia
- Sep 2008: The Dark Is Light Enough, Galerie Nordine Zidoun, Paris, France
- Feb-Jun 2008: Another Country, Kiang Gallery, Atlanta, GA
- May 2007: Bloodlines, Caren Golden Fine Art, New York, NY
- March 2007: Bradley McCallum & Jacqueline Tarry, Lisa Dent Gallery, San Francisco, CA.
