= List of museums in Baltimore =

This list of museums in Baltimore museums, defined for this context as institutions (including nonprofit organizations, government entities, and private businesses) that collect and care for objects of cultural, artistic, scientific, or historical interest and make their collections or related exhibits available for public viewing. Museums that exist only in cyberspace (i.e., virtual museums) are not included.

== Museums ==
Name	Neighborhood	Area of study	Summary
American Visionary Art Museum	Federal Hill	Art	Visionary art
B&O Railroad Museum	Washington Village	Railway	Collection includes 250 pieces of railroad rolling stock, 15,000 artifacts, an outdoor G-scale layout, an indoor HO scale model, and a wooden model train
Babe Ruth Birthplace and Museum	Downtown Baltimore	Sports	Life & times of Babe Ruth, Baltimore’s native son who became America’s first sports celebrity & an international icon, also the official Museum of the Baltimore Orioles and the archives of the Baltimore Colts and Johnny Unitas
Baltimore Clayworks	Mount Washington	Ceramics	Artists and student studios with public exhibition gallery
Baltimore Museum of Art	Homewood	Art	Over 90,000 works including African, American, Ancient Americas, Antioch Mosaics, Asian, Contemporary, European, Modern, Native American, Pacific Islands, prints, drawings & photographs, sculpture gardens, textiles
Baltimore Museum of Industry	Federal Hill	Industry	Exhibits highlight Baltimore and Maryland's companies and industries, including a cannery, a 1900 garment loft and machine shop, a print shop, Dr. Bunting's Pharmacy (where Noxzema was invented) and the food industry (McCormick, Domino Sugar, Esskay); also home to the steam tugboat Baltimore
Baltimore Streetcar Museum	Charles Village	Railway	Historic trolleys and electric bus streetcars
Carroll Mansion	Jonestown	Historic house	An 1811 mansion with changing art exhibits
The Contemporary	Downtown Baltimore	Art	A nomadic, non-collecting art museum
Cylburn Nature Museum	Cylburn	Natural history	Part of Cylburn Arboretum
Edgar Allan Poe House and Museum	Downtown Baltimore	Biographical	Former home of American writer Edgar Allan Poe in the 1830s
Eubie Blake Cultural Center	Mount Vernon	Art	Celebrates African American visual and performing arts
Evergreen Museum & Library	Homewood	Historic house	48-room Gilded Age mansion with exhibits of paintings, decorative arts, rare books, philanthropy, Baltimore's railroad history and more; operated by Johns Hopkins University
Fort McHenry	Locust Point	Military	Visitor center houses exhibits about the history of the fort, the War of 1812 and the Star Spangled Banner
Frederick Douglass-Isaac Myers Maritime Park	Fell's Point	Maritime	Galleries and interactive learning centers about the role of African Americans in maritime history; operated by Living Classrooms
G. Krug & Son Ironworks and Museum	Downtown Baltimore	Industrial	Historic blacksmith shop established in 1810
Historic Ships in Baltimore	Inner Harbor	Maritime	Historic museum ships including the USS Constellation, the Chesapeake (LV-116), and the Seven Foot Knoll Lighthouse
Homewood Museum	Homewood	Historic house	1801 Federal-period brick house with 19th-century-period rooms, part of Johns Hopkins University
Irish Railroad Workers Museum	Hollins Market	Historic house	5 alley houses where the Irish immigrants who worked for the adjoining B&O Railroad lived, project of the Railroad Historical District Corporation
Jewish Museum of Maryland	Jonestown	Ethnic - Jewish	Jewish history and culture in Maryland and beyond, tours of the Lloyd Street Synagogue
Johns Hopkins Archaeological Museum	Homewood	Archaeology	Ancient Egyptian, Greek, Roman, and Near Eastern antiquities
Lovely Lane Museum & Archives	Barclay	Religious	Operated by the Baltimore-Washington Conference United Methodist Historical Society, history of Baltimore-Washington Conference, important Methodist ministers, bishops and memorabilia
Maryland Art Place	Downtown Baltimore	Art	Contemporary art exhibition gallery
Maryland Center for History and Culture	Mount Vernon	History	Multiple exhibit spaces featuring the Revolutionary War, War of 1812, Civil War, quilts, fashion, photography, furniture, and more.
Maryland Institute College of Art Galleries	Bolton Hill	Art	Three major gallery spaces mount curated exhibitions by outside artists and exhibitions of faculty and student work: the Decker and Meyerhoff Galleries in the Fox Building and the Pinkard Gallery in the Bunting Center; also several galleries for student art
Maryland Museum of Military History	Baltimore	Military	Located in the Fifth Regiment Armory
Maryland Science Center	Federal Hill	Science	Displays include physical science, space, and the human body
Mother Seton House	Mount Vernon	Historic house	Located in Seton Hill Historic District, house where Elizabeth Ann Seton founded a school for girls
Mount Clare Museum House	Carrollton Ridge	Historic house	Mid 18th-century plantation house, operated by The National Society of the Colonial Dames of America
Museum of Baltimore Legal History	Downtown Baltimore	Legal	Historical artifacts/exhibits of Baltimore's judiciary and legal professions, managed by the Baltimore Courthouse and Law Museum Foundation, housed in a courtroom of the Clarence Mitchell Baltimore City Courthouse
National Great Blacks In Wax Museum	Oliver	Wax	Features important African American and black Maryland figures
National Museum of Dentistry	Downtown Baltimore	Medical	Dental history, oral health and dentistry professionals
National Slavic Museum	Fell's Point	Ethnic - Slavic	Polish and Slavic history museum
Peale Museum	Downtown Baltimore	Community & culture	
Phoenix Shot Tower	Downtown Baltimore	Industrial	Tower used to produce lead shots, tours operated by the Carroll Mansion
Port Discovery	Downtown Baltimore	Children's	
Reginald F. Lewis Museum of Maryland African American History & Culture	Little Italy	African American	Shows the struggles for self-determination made by African American Marylanders
Robert Long House	Fell's Point	Historic house	1765 brick house, operated by the Society for the Preservation of Federal Hill and Fells Point
School 33 Art Center	Federal Hill	Art	Contemporary visual art
Star Spangled Banner Flag House and 1812 Museum	Little Italy	Historic house	House where the "Star-Spangled Banner" flag was sewn; exhibits on War of 1812, period rooms
University of Maryland School of Nursing Living History Museum	Downtown Baltimore	Nursing	History of the School of Nursing at the University of Maryland, Baltimore
Walters Art Museum	Mount Vernon	Art	18th- & 19th-century art, Ancient Americas, Ancient Art, Asian, Islamic, Medieval, manuscripts & rare books, Renaissance & Baroque art

== Defunct museums ==
- American Dime Museum - museum of curiosities, closed in 2006
- Antique Toy Museum, Baltimore - closed in 2012
- B. Olive Cole Pharmacy Museum - was located in the Kelly building at the Maryland Pharmacists Association
- Baltimore City Life Museums - consortium of historic homes, building and sites (folded 1997)
- Baltimore Public Works Museum in the old Eastern Avenue Sewage Pumping Station of 1910 on the east bank of the Jones Falls by Pier 6 and Harbor East area, in the Inner Harbor - closed temporarily in 2010 by the City D.P.W.
- Contemporary Museum on West Centre Street and Park Avenue in the Mount Vernon-Belvedere neighborhood on Cathedral Hill - closed in 2012
- Fells Point Maritime Museum on Thames Street in the Fells Point waterfront community, opened 2004 by the Maryland Historical Society to exhibit its George Radcliffe Maritime Collection extensive but previously hidden in the basement level of the Md.H.S. Monument Street galleries - closed in 2007 with collections returned to Monument Street in Mount Vernon-Belvedere.
- Geppi's Entertainment Museum on the second floor of Camden Street Station - closed in 2018
- Mount Vernon Museum of Incandescent Lighting - Closed 2002, collection now at Baltimore Museum of Industry on Francis Scott Key Highway near Federal Hill.
- National Pinball Museum - closed 2013, collection sold off in March 2014
- Sports Legends Museum at Camden Yards, located inside historic Camden Street Station of 1857-1865 for the old Baltimore and Ohio Railroad as their main terminal and headquarters. Renovated/restored exterior in 1992 as part of adjacent Camden Yards Sports Complex of stadiums - Opened 2005 as sports museum for Maryland by the nearby Babe Ruth Birthplace and Museum on Emory Street - closed in 2015
- Ripley's Believe It or Not! Odditorium museum at Harborplace - Opened in June 2012 at the Light Street Pavilion, closed permanently in May 2020.

== Gallery ==
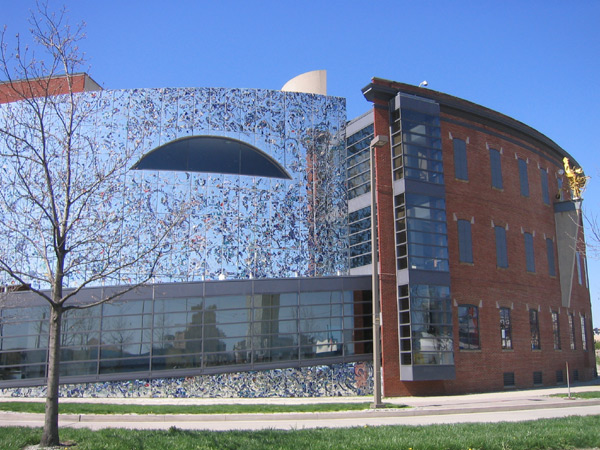
American Visionary Art Museum

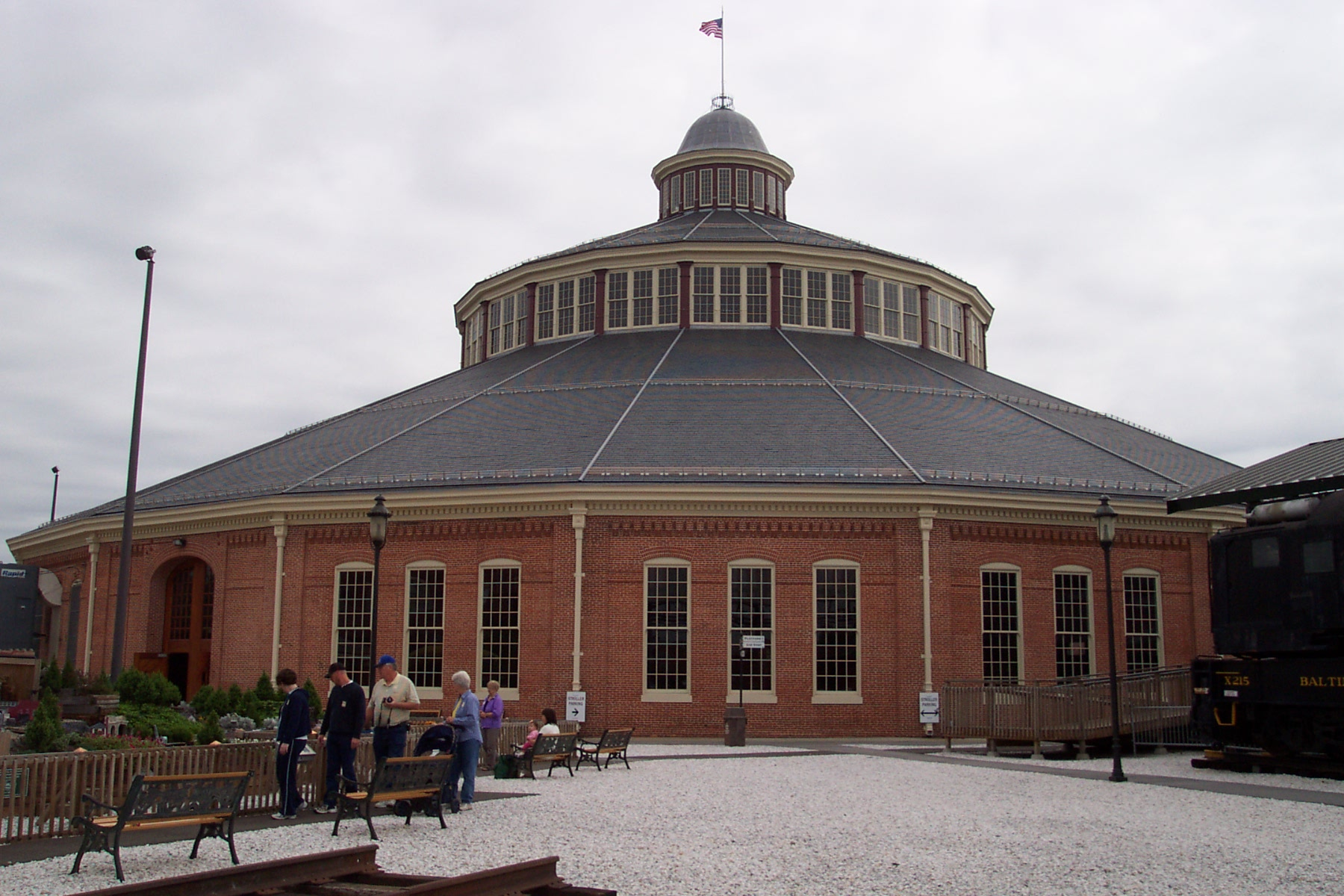
B & O Railroad Museum

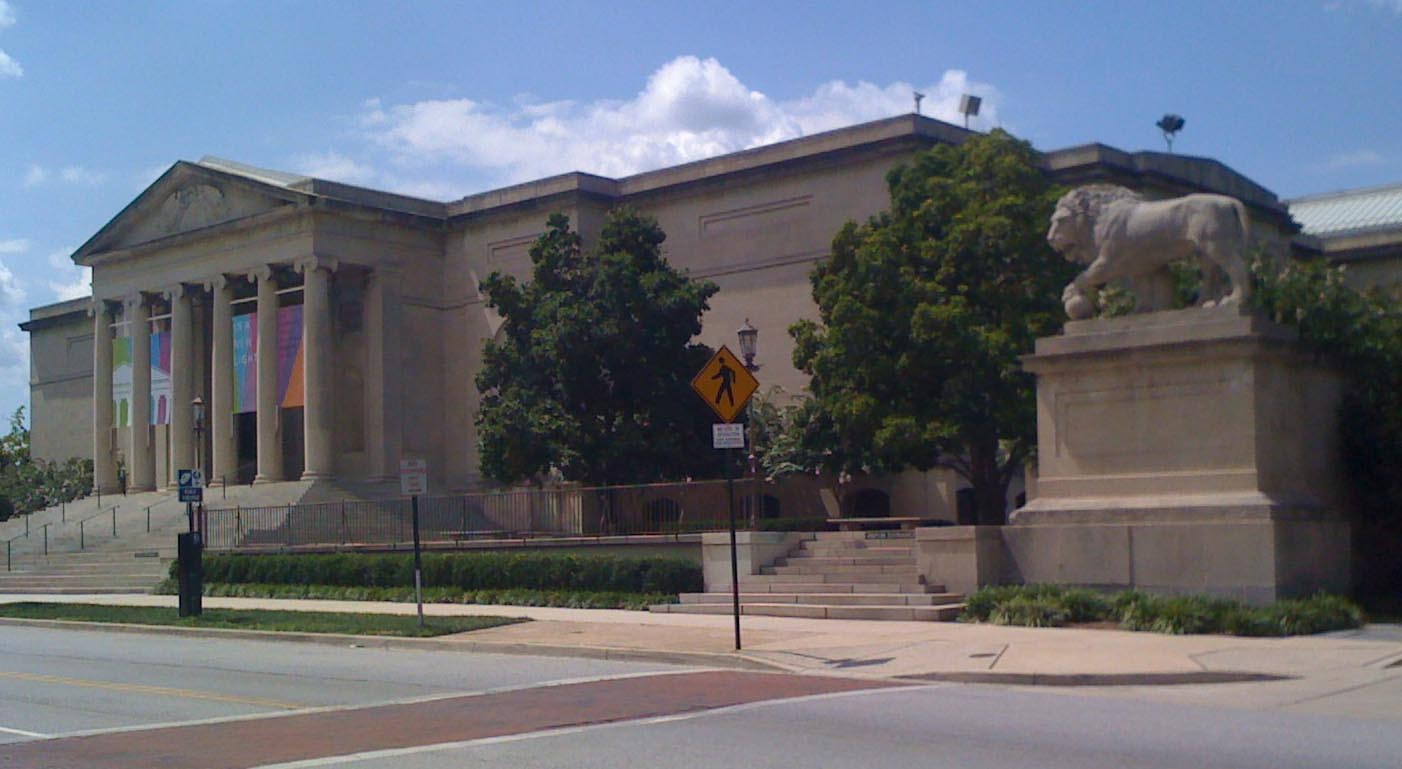
Baltimore Museum of Art

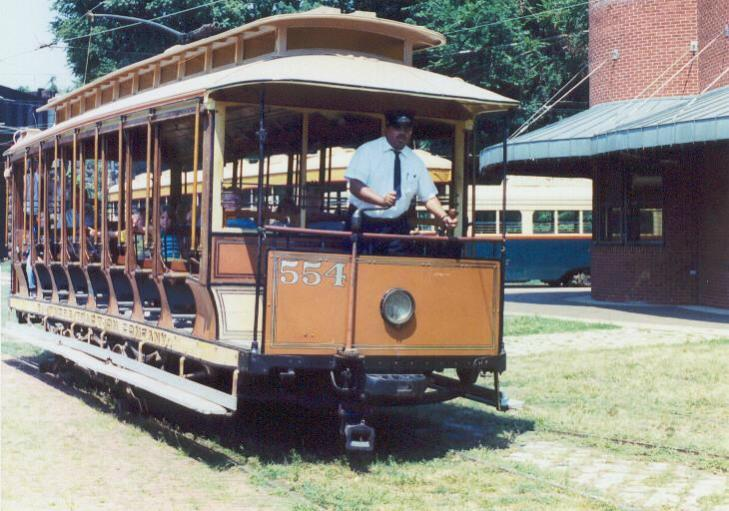
Baltimore Streetcar Museum

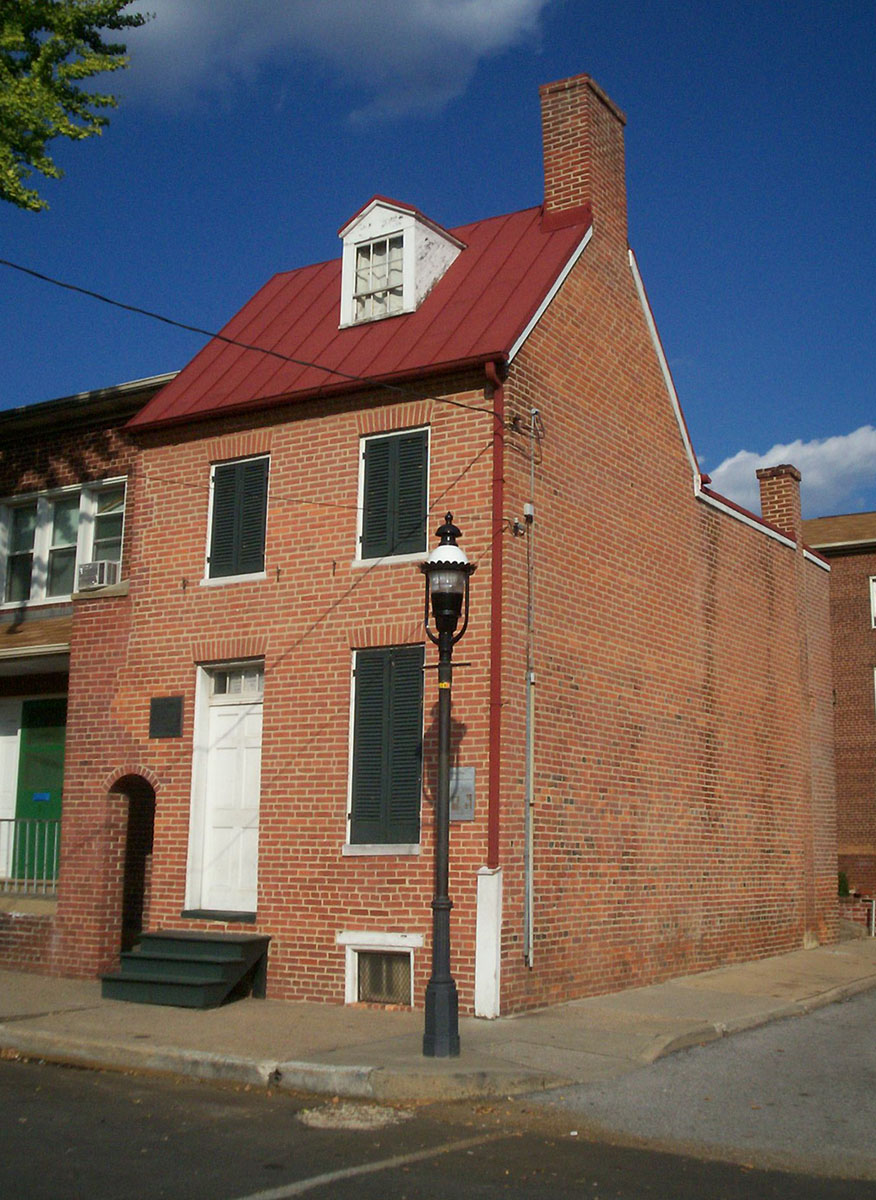
Edgar Allan Poe House and Museum

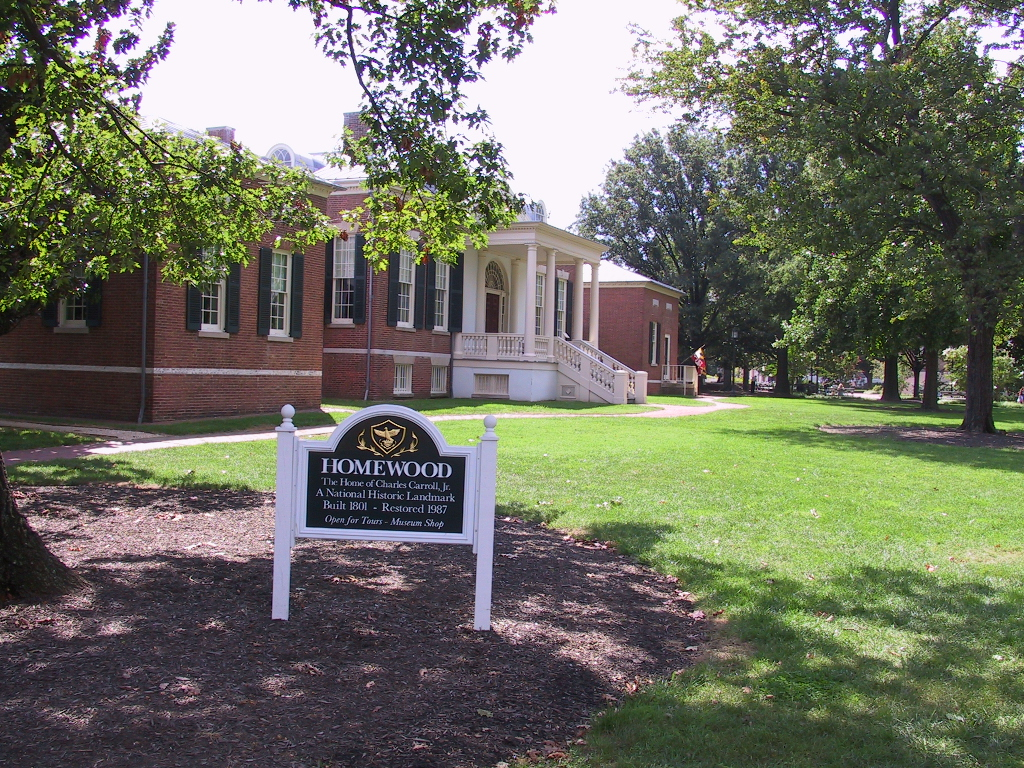
Homewood Museum

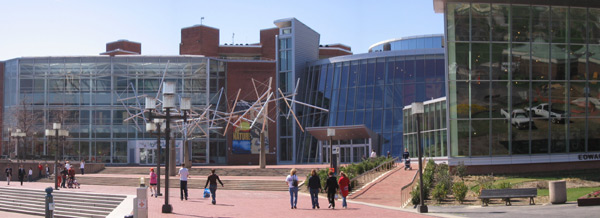
Maryland Science Center

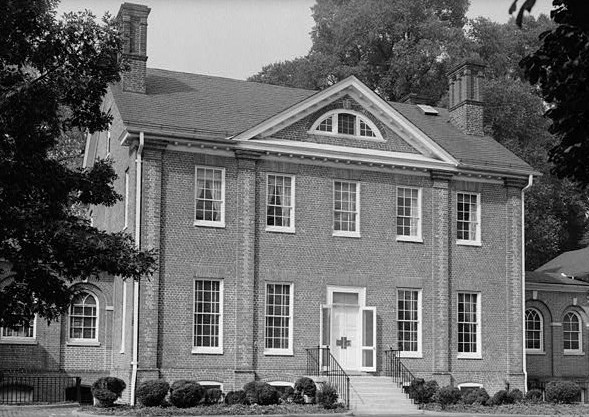
Mount Clare

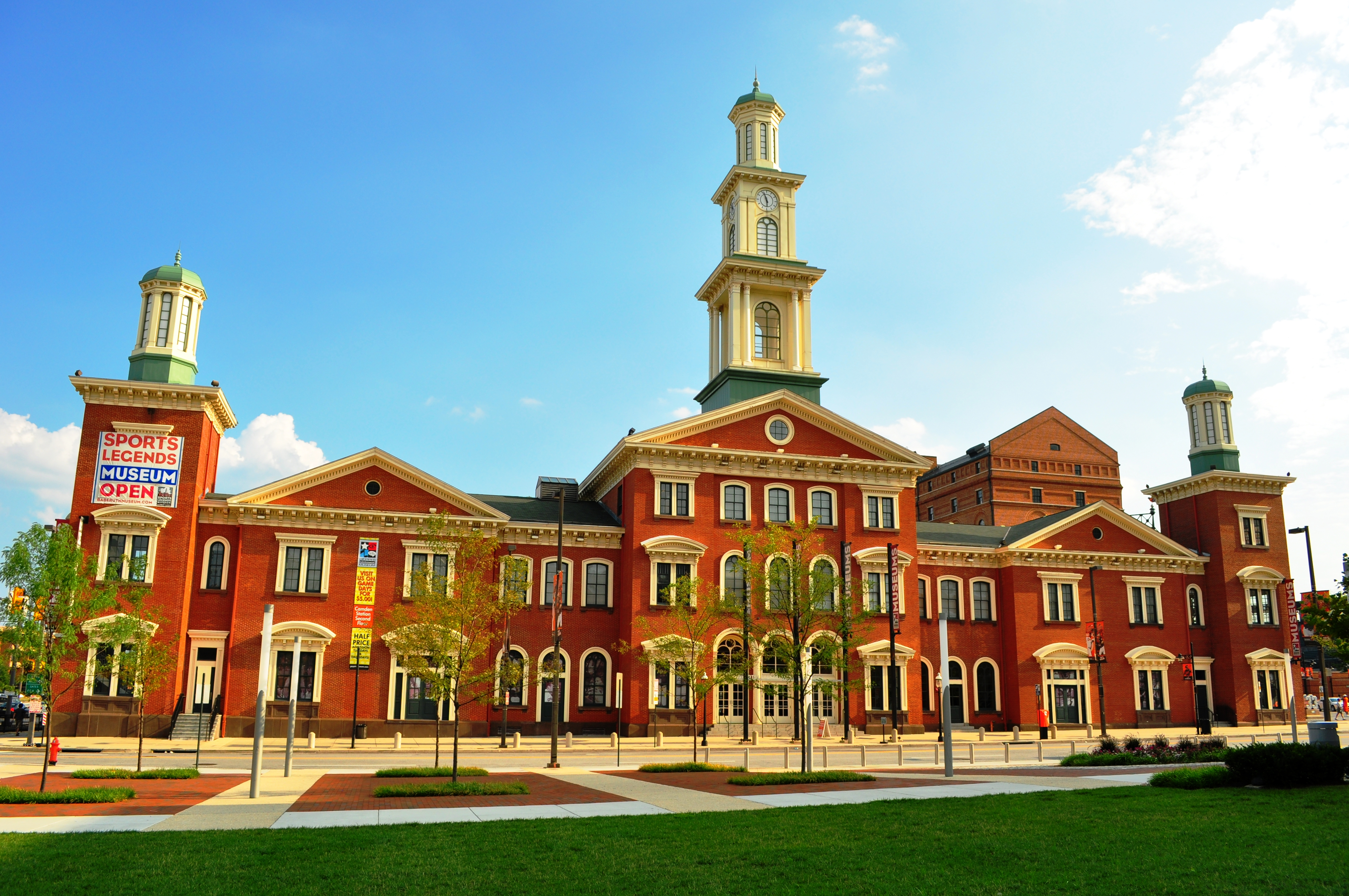
Former Sports Legends Museum (2005–2015) at historic Camden Street Station of the old Baltimore and Ohio Railroad

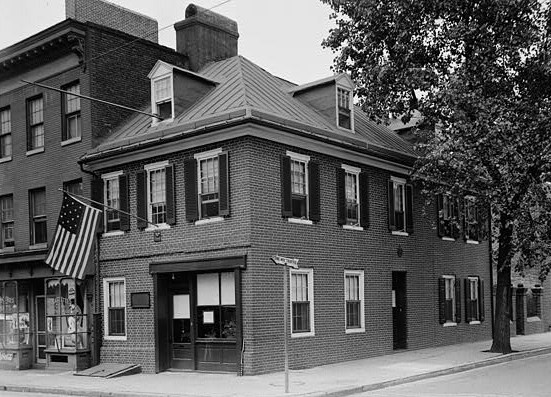
Star Spangled Banner Flag House and 1812 Museum - East Pratt and Albemarle Streets - home of flagmaker Mary Young Pickersgill of the Star-Spangled Banner flag

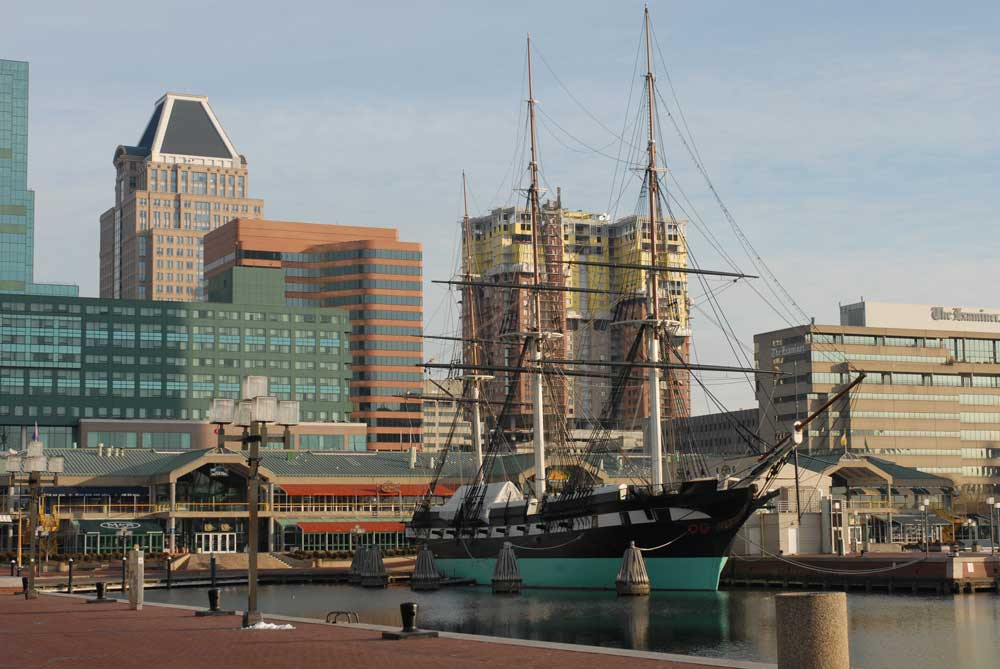
USS Constellation

== See also ==
- List of museums in Maryland
