= McCallum and Tarry =

Bradley H. McCallum and Jacqueline Tarry
- Website: http://mccallumtarry.com/

McCallum + Tarry is the professional artistic collaboration between Bradley McCallum and Jacqueline Tarry, a partnership the artists began in 1999. McCallum and Tarry, who are European American and African American, respectively, are best known for their creative layering of film, audio, painting, photography, and self-portraiture to examine social inequality and the legacy of race in the United States.

The artist team has executed and curated multimedia installations that exhibited globally in Beijing, Tokyo, Luxembourg, and nationally in Washington, D.C., Atlanta, Seattle, and New York City, among others. In 2012, the Hirshhorn Museum at the Smithsonian acquired a painting from McCallum + Tarry's Whitewash series.

== Biography ==
McCallum + Tarry's first collaborative work was Witness: Perspectives on Police Violence, which was inspired by the Abner Louima and Amadou Diallo cases in 1997 in New York City. By provocatively exploring incidents of police brutality, Witness generated national controversy and established the artists as prominent social commentators. The artists’ 2003 installation depicting homeless youth in Seattle, Endurance, built on this reputation.

In 2003, they also began creating a series of self-portrait video works that focused on their own interracial collaborative, with references to historic slavery, particularly in notable works Otis, Topsy-Turvy, Evenly Yoked, and Mammy/Daddy. In 2008, they returned to creating large-scale artwork addressing racial histories, most notably in the projects Evidence of Things Not Seen, Within Our Gates, Wade in the Water, and the Whitewash painting series.

== Selected works ==
=== Evidence of Things Not Seen, 2008 ===
Perhaps one of McCallum + Tarry's most well-known projects, Evidence of Things Not Seen, uses 104 painted portraits of protesters who were arrested during the January 1956 Montgomery bus boycott to conceptually re-examine the history of the Civil Rights Movement. McCallum and Tarry constructed each portrait with two layers: an oil painting on linen overlaid by a photographic image printed on sheer silk, both based on the original police "mugshots" of each protester. The double overlay effects a contrast between portraiture as a mark of dignity and photography as a form of documentation and evidence.

Art critic Joyce Youmans described the images as having a "ghostly quality", writing:

This effect makes the subjects seem both present and absent: the identity of each individual is undeniable, even though their arrests have reduced them—and their allegedly unlawful actions—to a mere ID number…the formal brilliance and conceptual complexity of The Evidence of Things Not Seen is almost as dizzying as the hazy figures imaged in the portraits themselves.

The final installation, which was presented in the New Orleans African American Museum, was part of the Prospect.1 New Orleans Biennial in 2008. Art critic Roberta Smith remarked that the exhibition was "one of the most haunting matchups of art and site" at the Biennial.

=== Within Our Gates, 2008 ===
McCallum + Tarry were commissioned by the non-profit organization Atlanta Celebrates Photography to create a site-specific installation in an abandoned water tower in Atlanta's Fourth Ward, the neighborhood where Dr. Martin Luther King lived and worked. Building on the archival research they had undertaken for Evidence of Things Not Seen, the artist team converted the tower, which had once been used to supply water to a neighboring cotton mill. They created a cathedral-like space illuminated by three simultaneous projections of Civil Rights-era footage and two contrasting audio pieces: a recording of Governor George Wallace's speech, "The Civil Rights Movement: Fraud, Sham and Hoax" given on July 4, 1964, and artist Imani Uzuri’s chilling repetition of the word "freedom". The final video and audio installation, titled Within Our Gates, filled the space above a wooden pier constructed over a reflecting pool of circulating water.

"We're really interested, not just in the heroic footage that exists of the Civil Rights movement," said Jacqueline Tarry during an interview conducted at the water tower, "but the gesture, the quiet gesture of silent and subtle resistance that everyday people took to make the Civil Rights movement successful."

=== Endurance, 2003–2004 ===
In 2003, the Seattle Arts Commission commissioned McCallum + Tarry to work with Peace on the Street by Kids from the Streets to create a work that gave voice to homeless youth in Seattle. The project they ultimately created, Endurance, was installed at Conner Contemporary Art in Washington, D.C. It featured a video of 26 homeless youth standing on a street corner staring into the camera. The video used time-lapse photography to compress an hour of real time to five minutes, incorporating audio testimonials of the youth to capture their theoretical invisibility as cars and people zoom around them. Art critic Michael O'Sullivan commented that the work induced a sense of "discomfort" that "raises McCallum and Tarry's work from the level of sociology or documentary to richly disturbing art".

The New York Times reviewer Holland Cotter commented that the artwork constituted "a ritual dance, a morality play and a mortality play". Cotter continued,

The story is primal. It's about being singular and at home in the world at the same time, and how difficult, but possible, that is. The homeless people in Endurance are living the story. The collaboration with Mr. McCallum and Ms. Tarry gives them a chance to perform it—that’s the art part, the distancing and clarifying part—and lets us participate as witnesses.

=== Mid-Career surveys ===
In 2010, the Baltimore Contemporary Museum organized a mid-career survey of McCallum + Tarry's work, Bearing Witness, curated by Irene Hoffman. The exhibition was hosted by multiple venues in Baltimore, including the Maryland Institute College of Art, the Walters Art Museum, Carroll Mansion, and the Reginald F. Lewis Museum of Maryland African American History & Culture.

The Burchfield Penney Art Center in Buffalo, New York organized McCallum + Tarry's second mid-career survey, Intersections, in 2013. According to the Buffalo News,

The two have dedicated their impressive careers to exploring the painful and murky history of race in the United States. McCallum + Tarry's work spans all media. And this show contains multitudes: videos pieced together from footage and photographs of the civil rights movement; large, color portraits of young homeless people; audio loops from victims of police brutality, embedded in old-fashioned phone boxes; shrouded gravestones honoring dead slaves, and well over 100 haunting portraits created using an inspired amalgam of oil painting and photography.

== Awards and residencies ==
- 2012: Painting Fellowship, New York Foundation for the Arts
- 2008: Video Fellowship, New York Foundation for the Arts
- 2008: Residency, Tokyo Wonder Site Aoyama, Tokyo
- 2006: Residency, McColl Center, Charlotte, N.C.
- 2004–06: Lambent Fellowship in the Arts, Tides Foundation, New York
- 1999: Institute on the Arts and Civic Dialogue, Harvard University, Boston

== Solo exhibitions ==
- Feb 2013: In Latitudes Where Storms are Born, Greenfield Community College Gallery, Mass.
- Sep–Jan 2012–13: Intersections: McCallum & Tarry, Burchfield Penny Art Center, Buffalo
- Jul 2012: Wade in the Water, Galerie Nordine Zidoun, Luxembourg
- Sep 2010: Evenly Yoked: Bradley McCallum & Jacqueline Tarry, Spelman College, Atlanta
- May 2010: Bearing Witness: Work by Bradley McCallum & Jacqueline Tarry, Contemporary Museum Baltimore, Maryland Institute College of Art, The Walters Art Museum, Carroll Mansion, Phoenix Shot Tower, Reginald F. Lewis Museum of Maryland African American History & Culture, Maryland Art Place, Baltimore
- May 2009: Shades of Black, Galerie Nordine Zidoun, Luxembourg
- Oct 2008: Within Our Gates, Irwin Street Water Tower, Atlanta
- Sep 2008: The Dark Is Light Enough, Galerie Nordine Zidoun, Paris
- Feb-Jun 2008: Another Country, Kiang Gallery, Atlanta
- May 2007: Bloodlines, Caren Golden Fine Art, New York
