= Conjunction Arts =

Non-profit organization

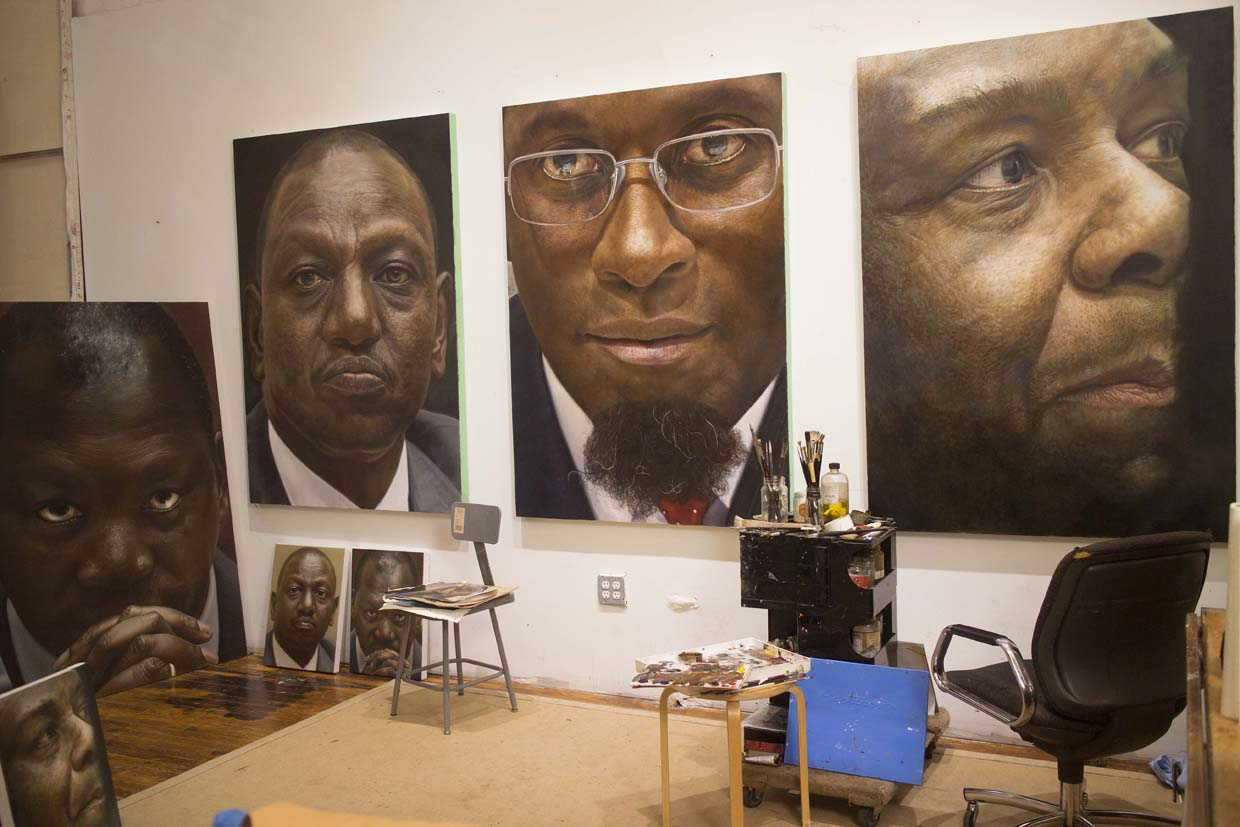
- Studio image of Weights and Measures by Bradley McCallum under development
- Formation: June 20, 1989
- Type: Arts Organization
- Tax ID no.: 22-3022634
- Registration no.: 06-26-09
- Headquarters: 62 Washington Avenue, Brooklyn, NY 11205
- Founding Director: Bradley McCallum
- Website: conjunctionarts.org

Conjunction Arts is a non-profit organization registered in New York that is primarily focused on supporting artists working in the field of socially engaged art through fiscal sponsorship and residency connections with social justice organizations. It was founded in 1989 as “Collaborative Urban Sculpture” by Bradley McCallum as a vehicle to self-produce his own work. The organization was renamed "Conjunction Arts" in 1999 when its mission expanded to support the collaborative work of McCallum and Tarry and create partnerships between artists and non-art organizations, such as a creative recycling project at a high school in the Bronx. In 2009, Conjunction Arts partnered with Greenfield Community College in Massachusetts to launch the Brick + Mortar International Video Festival, which converted downtown Greenfield into a seasonal arts district for three consecutive years to present contemporary video art from artists across the globe. In 2014, Conjunction Arts partnered with the Coalition for the International Criminal Court to launch the Arts Initiative for International Justice and to host Bradley McCallum in a unique artist residency to develop the initiative's pilot project, a body of portraiture titled Weights and Measures.
