= Contemporary Museum =

Contemporary Museum may refer to:

- Contemporary Museum Baltimore
- Honolulu Museum of Art Spalding House (formerly The Contemporary Museum, Honolulu)
