= Creative Court =

- Founded: 2013, The Hague, Netherlands
- Purpose: Developing art projects, reflecting on global peace and justice
- Website: www.creativecourt.org

Creative Court is an organisation that develops art projects and reflects on peace and justice. Creative Court is based in The Hague, Netherlands. It was founded in November 2013.

== And Now I Am Here ==
=== Project description ===
In 2015 two journalists, Els Duran and Evelien Vehof, conducted interviews regarding statelessness in Europe in which they came across complicated regulations, coping mechanisms and pragmatism. Creative Court developed the video installation And Now I Am Here based upon these findings. This video installation questioned feelings of displacement from various angles through the use of interviews, excerpts and quotes from literature and philosophy were merged with the images of video artist Farah Rahman, whose work revolves around migration.

This video installation was created as part of the framework of the Europe by People arts and design programme which took place during the Dutch presidency of the Council of the European Union in 2016.

=== Artists and experts involved ===
- Video artist: Farah Rahman
- Research and interviews: Giselle Vegter, Els Duran, Evelien Vehof
- Interpretation and translations: Carlijn Teeven, Myrte Sara Huyts, Morgan Mekertichian
- Production: Anja Janssen
- Artistic and business management: Creative Court

=== Exhibitions ===
- LUX, Nijmegen
- Muziekgebouw aan 't IJ, Amsterdam
- Compagnietheater, Amsterdam
- The Wall, Amsterdam

=== Recognition ===
Articles

- Compagnietheatre (Dutch)
- Europe by People (English)
- Montesquieu Instituut (English)
- Nederlands Kamerkoor (Dutch)
- Nederlands Kamerkoor (English)

Radio

- Kunst en Cultuur op Vrijdag on AmsterdamFM (Dutch)

== Post-Conflict Mind Check ==
=== Project description ===
Post-Conflict Mind Check (working title The Ghost of Tito) is a tongue-in-cheek prototype card game created by Creative Court and MediaLAB about culture, history, conflict, and stereotypes in the six countries that once made up the former Yugoslavia. The game aims to engage players with socially taboo topics and unconventional content. It was developed in 2015 to be used for personal reflection and critical thinking about post-war legacy in the former Yugoslavia.

=== Artists and experts involved ===
- Commissioner: Creative Court
- Project mentor: Tamara Pinos
- Students: Jon Jonoski (MA media studies), Jennifer Lamphere (MA history) and Liliana Zambrano (BA industrial design)

=== Presentations ===
- MediaLAB, Amsterdam

=== Recognition ===
Blog

- Post-Conflict Mind Check, MediaLAB (English)

== Rooms of Humanity ==
=== Project description ===
With De Balie, a centre for freedom of speech, art, politics, culture, cinema and media in Amsterdam, Creative Court produced Rooms of Humanity, a reflective programme, around (in)humanity in times of war and genocide. It debuted in The Netherlands at De Balie in Amsterdam on Saturday, 19 September 2015.

The theatre installation consists of the Room of Game, the Room of Propaganda, the Room of Acts for Humanity, and the Room of Questions and Answers and includes photographic and textual visuals, an audio installation, as well as group activities and discussions. Rooms of Humanity connects to themes such as individual and collective responsibility, exclusion, war, genocide, (in)humanity, propaganda, and the dynamic between victim – perpetrator – bystander.

=== Artists and experts involved ===
- Artistic directors: Ilil Land-Boss (Israel-Germany) and Giselle Vegter (the Netherlands)
- Scenic design: Karin Betzler
- Business management: Creative Court
- Special guest speakers:
  - Nenad Fišer, a philosopher and former employee of the International Criminal Tribunal for the former Yugoslavia in The Hague
  - Erna Rijsdijk, a university lecturer in military ethics at the Netherlands Defence Academy (NLDA)
  - Inger Schaap, a historian and the national director of Humanity in Action in the Netherlands
  - Uğur Ümit Üngör, a sociologist, political historian, and genocide researcher at the NIOD Institute for War, Holocaust, and Genocide Studies
- Moderator: Markha Valenta, a professor of American studies at Radboud University Nijmegen

=== Exhibitions ===
- Theatre installation, De Balie, Amsterdam

=== Recognition ===
Articles

- What is Happening Now? (English)

Radio

- Dichtbij Nederland (Dutch)

== Africans and Hague Justice ==
=== Project description ===
Creative Court curated a selection of African cartoons that reflect on the International Criminal Court. The selection was made in the framework of the Nederlandse Vereniging voor Afrika Studies conference, Africans and Hague Justice, Realities and Perceptions of the International Criminal Court in Africa, which took place at The Hague University of Applied Sciences in May 2014.

=== Artists involved ===
The following cartoonists are represented in the collection: Alphonce 'Ozone' Omondi (Kenya), Brandan Reynolds (South Africa), Cuan Miles (South Africa), Damien Glez (Burkina Faso/France), Mohammed 'Dr. Meddy' Jumanne (Tanzania), Godfrey 'Gado' Mwampembwa (Tanzania), Jonathon 'Zapiro' Shapiro (South Africa), Khalid Albaih (Sudan/Qatar), Khalil Bendib (Algeria/US), Popa 'Kamtu' Matumula (Tanzania), Roland Polman (Ivory Coast), Talal Nayer (Sudan/Tunisia), Tayo Fatunla (UK/Nigeria), and Victor Ndula (Kenya).

=== Exhibitions ===
- Post-Conflict group exhibition, Nichido Contemporary Art, Tokyo
- Post-Conflict group exhibition, Kinz + Tillou Fine Art Gallery, New York
- Africans and Hague Justice, African Studies Centre, University of Leiden
- Africans and Hague Justice, The Hague University of Applied Science

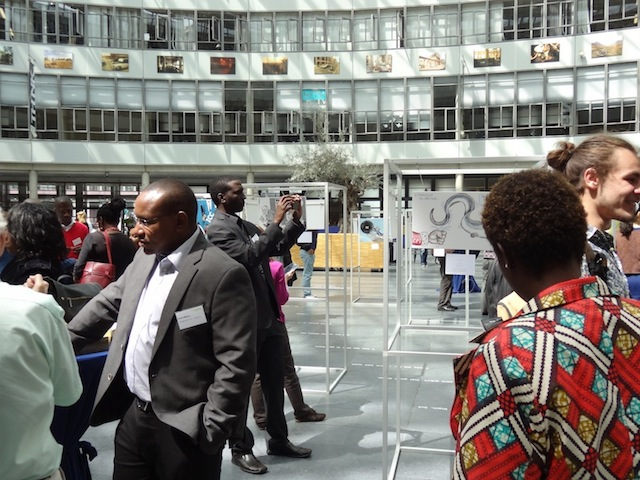
Image: Creative Court. Africans & Hague Justice exhibition, The Hague City Hall, 2014

=== Recognition ===
Articles

- Leiden University
- Daily Nation
- ILG2
- Creating Rights
- Coalition for the International Criminal Court#globalJUSTICE

Television

- The Docket on MSNBC

== Rwanda 20 Years: Portraits of Reconciliation ==
=== Project description ===
Creative Court developed a photography project that reflects on forgiveness in post-genocide Rwanda. They commissioned South African photographer Pieter Hugo and Croatian-Dutch photographer Lana Mesić to try and capture the nature of forgiveness. The project includes photographs, interviews, and videos.

=== Exhibitions ===
- Anatomy of Forgiveness, AMC Brummelkamp Galerie, Amsterdam
- Art Rotterdam Prospects and Concepts Exhibition, Art Rotterdam, Rotterdam
- Harry Pennings Award group exhibition, Galerie Pennings, Eindhoven
- Exhibition, Organ Vida International Photography Festival 7th ed, Zagreb
- Exhibition, Goethe Institut Kigali, Kigali
- Post-Conflict group exhibition, Nichido Contemporary Art, Tokyo
- Post-Conflict group exhibition, Kinz + Tillou Fine Art Gallery, New York
- Exhibition, Het Nutshuis, The Hague
- Outdoor mini exhibition, Central Station, The Hague
- Outdoor mini exhibition, International Criminal Court, The Hague
- Outdoor mini exhibition, Peace Palace, The Hague
- Mini exhibition, The Hague City Hall, The Hague

=== Recognition ===
Articles

- The Calvert Journal (English)
- Feature Shoot (English)
- The New York Times (English)
- Embassy of the Republic of Rwanda Netherlands (English + Dutch)
- Time Lightbox (English)
- United States Institute of Peace Global Peacebuilding Center (English)
- The Huffington Post (English)
- Future TV Network (Arabic)
- New Statesman (English)
- Reading The Pictures (formerly BagNews) (English)
- Everyday Ambassador (English)
- The Hairpin (English)
- Episcopal Café (English)
- Glamour Paris (French)
- AfriqueConnection.com (French)
- EO Beam (Dutch)
- IGIHE (Kinyarwanda)
- Religion Factor (English)
- Kontrapress (Serbian)
- Blogg HD(Swedish)
- Who Cares (Dutch)
- Liberal Planet (English)
- Common Dreams (English)
- Tabnak (Persian)
- Mad House News (Russian)
- Domingo El Universal (Spanish)
- Los Herrajeros (Spanish)
- La Nacion (Spanish)
- Moscabranca (Portuguese)
- Inspirulina (Spanish)
- Le Vif (French)
- Chatelaine (English)
- RonnieArias.com (Spanish)
- Nafir (Persian)
- Noor News (Persian)
- Sadkhabar (Persian)
- Parsine (Persian)
- De Volkskrant (Dutch)
- Filosofie (Dutch)
- Jewish Journal (English)
- Revolución 3.0, Argos media (Spanish)
- Organization for Security and Co-Operation in Europe (English)
- IBA Global Healing (English)
- Sentidos Comunes (Spanish)
- Incubadora de Artistas (Portuguese)
- Para Ti Magazine (Spanish)
- Fondazione Camis de Fonseca (Italian)
- Memory Machine (Dutch)
- Westminster Chapel (English)
- Art Annual Online (Japanese)
- Ousferrats (Spanish)
- Inya Rwanda (Kinyarwanda)
- Fuett.mx (Spanish)
- 40 Cheragh (Persian)
- Beelddragers (Dutch)
- Diaspora Enligne (French)
- Partido Socialista (Spanish)
- Acción Preferente (Spanish)
- Reader's Digest (English)
- The Courier Mail (English)
- RYOT News & Action (English)
- Marie Claire South Africa (English)
- Den Haag Direct (Dutch)
- Musée Digital Magazine (English)
- Dar lugar (Spanish)
- MiNDFOOD (English)
- Greenpeace Magazin (German)
- The East African (English)
- Coalition for the International Criminal Court#globalJUSTICE (English)
- Citizens for Global Solutions (English)
- A Journey into Holocaust & Genocide Education (English)
- Invisible Children (English)
- Creating Rights (English)
- Human Trustees (English)
- NRC (Dutch)
- New Dawn (Dutch)
- A Pattern A Day (English)
- Index.hr (Croatian)

Radio and television

- Q on CBC Radio One in Canada (English)
- Schepper & Co Radio (English)
- The Docket on MSNBC (English)
- Ebony Life Television (English)
- Globo.tv (Portuguese)
- Prime 10 TV (Kinyarwanda + English)

== Partners and funding ==
Association Modeste et Innocent (Rwanda), City of The Hague, Doctors Without Borders, Foundation for Democracy and Media, Goethe-Institut Kigali (Rwanda), Haagse Hogeschool (The Hague School of Applied Sciences), Hogeschool INHolland, Huis van Gedichten, Humanity House, International Institute of Social Studies, Justitia et Pax, Karekezi Film Productions (Rwanda), Leiden University, Liberation Festival the Hague / Bevrijdingsfestival Den Haag, Mediaridders, Mondrian Fund, Mukomeze Foundation, Nederlandse Vereniging voor Afrika Studies (NVAS), NIOD Institute for War, Holocaust and Genocide Studies / Nationaal Instituut voor Oorlogs-, Holocaust- en Genocidestudies (NIOD), Nutshuis Den Haag, Prince Claus Fund, Tilburg University, United Nations High Commissioner for Refugees (UNHCR), amongst others.
