= New Orleans African American Museum =

Museum in New Orleans, Louisiana

- NOAAM

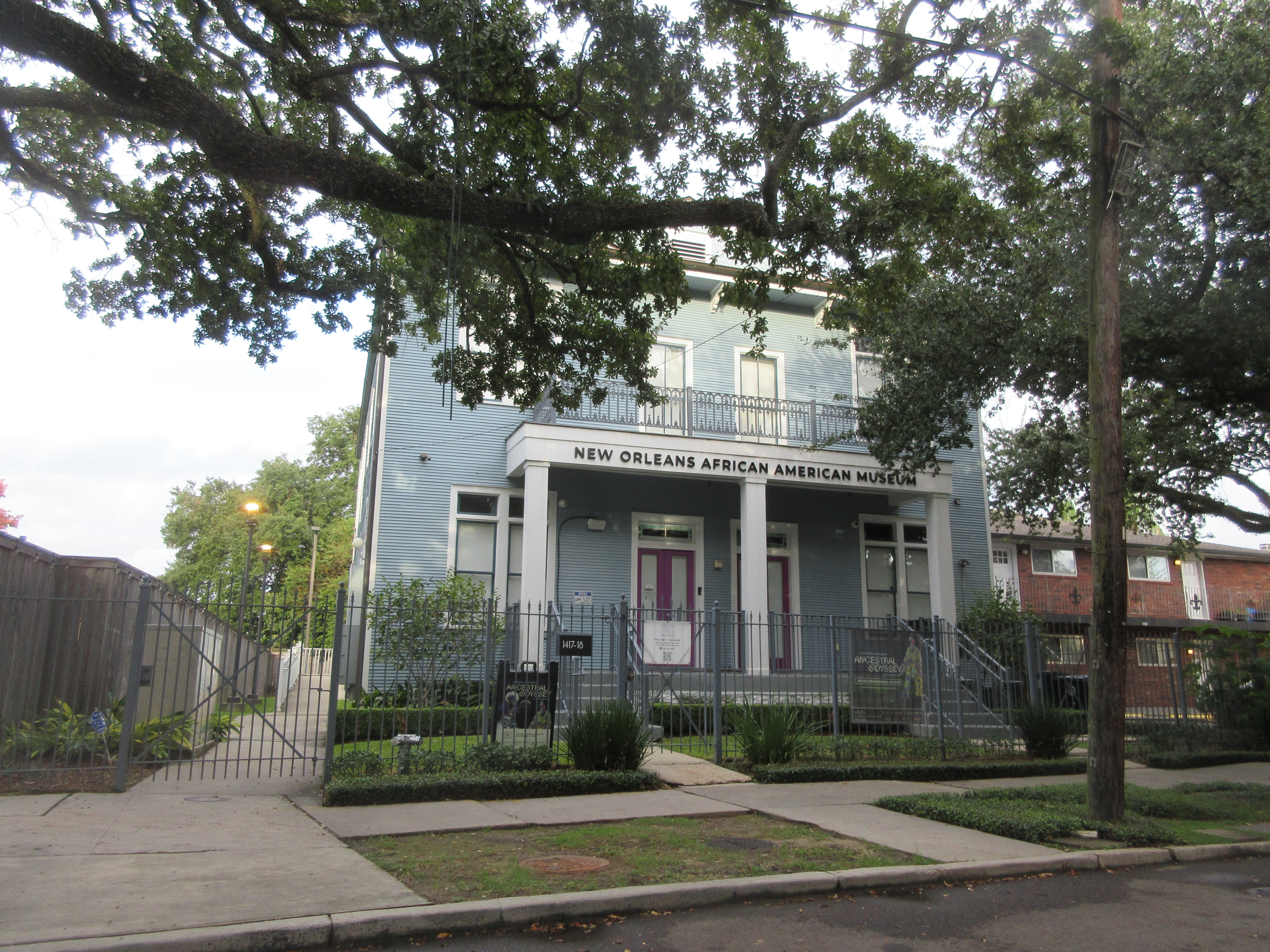
- Museum building, 2025
- Established: 1996
- Location: 1417- 1418 Governor Nicholls Street; New Orleans, Louisiana 70116
- Coordinates: 29.9667836°N 90.0677693°W
- Type: African-American culture
- Executive director: Gia M. Hamilton
- Deputy & Creative Director: Cameron-Mitchell Ware
- Chairpersons: Edgar "Dook" Chase, IV
- Website: www.noaam.org

The New Orleans African American Museum (NOAAM) is a museum in New Orleans, Louisiana's visiting Tremé neighborhood, the oldest-surviving black community in the United States. The NOAAM of Art, Culture and History seeks to educate and to preserve, interpret, and promote the contributions that people of African descent have made to the development of New Orleans and Louisiana culture, as slaves and as free people of color throughout the history of American slavery as well as during emancipation, Reconstruction, and contemporary times.

== Description ==
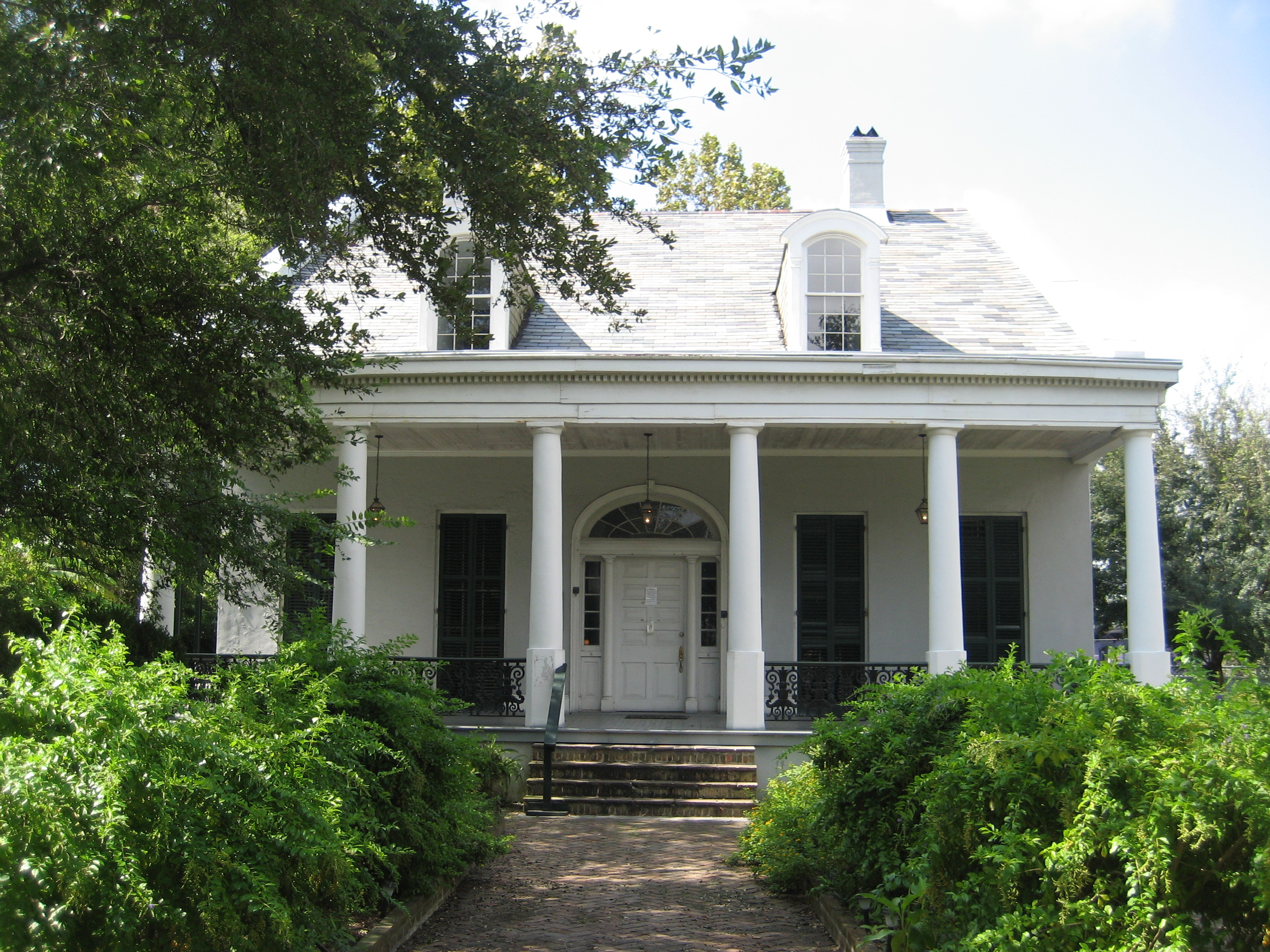
The historic Meilleur-Goldthwaite House, across the street from the main NOAAM.

The NOAAM property encompasses seven historical structures located on the site of a former plantation. A significant large building, built of brick in 1828–1829, is the Meilleur-Goldthwaite House, the finest remaining Creole "maison de maître" or master's house in the city. It is a raised center-hall cottage with large dormer windows. Its outbuildings, original interior, and much of the large lot on which it was built have been preserved as part of the site.

In September 1991, the Villa Meilleur was purchased by the City of New Orleans. This historic landmark was restored under the administration of Mayor Marc H. Morial, the Mayor's Division of Housing & Neighborhood Development, New Orleans Affordable Home Ownership, and the U.S. Department of Housing and Urban Development.

It has become the cornerstone of redevelopment in Tremé. Permanent and temporary exhibits spotlight contemporary artists in the main house and in the former slave quarters. Having suffered substantial roof and water damage during Hurricane Katrina in 2005, the museum was restored and reopened in February 2008. Additional improvements to the remaining structures started under the leadership of former Executive Director Jonn Hankins.

== Collection and exhibits ==
One of the museum's centerpieces is the "Louisiana-Congo: the Bertrand Donation," a collection of African beadwork, costumes, masks, textiles and musical instruments. The 70-piece assortment of original African artwork is from the Democratic Republic of Congo. It illuminates the parallels between everyday life in the Congo and Louisiana folk culture. Other exhibits change regularly and highlight a range of works from traditional African art, to black influences and culture in modern life in New Orleans.

In 2008, the NOAAM participated in Prospect New Orleans, the largest biennial of international contemporary art ever organized in the United States and the first to be held in New Orleans. It was curated by Dan Cameron, with exhibits by internationally celebrated artists McCallum + Tarry (Bradley McCallum and Jacqueline Tarry), William Kentridge, and Rico Gatson. In August 2008, the Museum hosted an exhibit of Hurricane Katrina-related photographs by New York City photographer John Rosenthal.

In January 2011, the city awarded the museum a $3 million (~$4.11 million in 2024) CDBG grant, to undertake renovation of existing properties: Villa Meilleur, Passebon Cottage (1843) and Passebon's servant quarters. In addition, the museum will acquire 1417-1419 Governor Nicholls Street to expand its campus. The latter building will be used to house administration, community events, and other support functions. The changes will enable the museum to collaborate more with area universities in "creative arts, museum studies, art, history, archiving and educational programming."

The Museum is featured as a site on the Louisiana African American Heritage Trail.

== See also ==
- List of museums in Louisiana
- List of museums focused on African Americans
