= Pieter Hugo =

South African photographer (born 1976)

- Born: 29 October 1976 (age 49); Johannesburg, South Africa
- Occupation: Photographer
- Years active: 2002–present
- Website: www.pieterhugo.com

Pieter Hugo (born 1976) is a South African photographer who primarily works in portraiture. He lives in Cape Town.

Hugo has had four monographs published. He has had solo exhibitions at Museu Coleção Berardo, Lisbon (2018), Museum für Kuns und Kulturgeschichte, Dortmund, Kunstmuseum Wolfsburg, Germany, National Portrait Gallery, London, Ludwig Museum, Budapest, Institute of Modern Art, Brisbane, Multimedia Art Museum, Moscow and the South African National Gallery, Cape Town. He has been included in group exhibitions at the National Museum of Modern and Contemporary Art in Seoul, the Rijksmuseum, the Netherlands, Tate Modern, London, DeVos Art Museum, Marquette, Michigan, and Museo de Arte Contemporaneo de Santiago, Chile.

== Early life ==
Hugo was born in Johannesburg, South Africa.

== Career ==
He began his career working in the film industry in Cape Town, before undertaking a two-year residency at Fabrica research centre, Treviso, Italy.

Hugo has had four monographs published: Pieter Hugo: The Hyena and Other Men (2008), Pieter Hugo: Selected Works (2009), This Must Be the Place (2012), and Pieter Hugo: Between the Devil and the Deep Blue Sea (2017).

He has produced fashion photography features for Arena Homme Plus, Re-Edition Magazine, Document Journal, System Magazine and AnOther Man. He has also collaborated on publications with Louis Vuitton and Hood By Air.

Hugo has contributed to publications such as The New Yorker, Zeit magazine, Le Monde and The New York Times Magazine. In May 2015 he was invited to guest edit the supplement DeLuxe for the Dutch newspaper NRC.nl.

In 2011 Hugo collaborated with Michael Cleary, co-directing the music video for South African musician Spoek Mathambo's cover version of Joy Division's "She's Lost Control". For the video, Hugo won the Young Director Award at the Cannes Lions International Festival of Creativity. In 2015 he directed the music video for "Dirty", a song by South African musical artists Dookoom.

== Work ==
Hugo's work is governed by a self-taught approach to photography. He is one of a generation of post-Apartheid photographers that seeks to confront photography's history of representing marginalised and disempowered people. His work aims to challenge preconceptions around the representation of groups of people 'other' to the Western European norm.

Hugo's first major work Looking Aside (2006) depicts portraits of people "whose appearance makes us look aside" – the blind, people with albinism, the aged, his family and himself. Each of these portraits has the subject posed in a sterile studio setting, under crisp light against a blank background.

His Rwanda 2004: Vestiges of a Genocide (2011) was described by the Rwanda Genocide Institute as offering "a forensic view of some of the sites of mass execution and graves that stand as lingering memorials to the many thousands of people slaughtered." Hugo's most recognized work is The Hyena & Other Men (2007), which has received a great deal of attention. His series Messina/Mussina (2007) was made in the town of Musina on the border between Zimbabwe and South Africa, after Colors magazine asked Hugo to work on an AIDS story. Nollywood (2009) consists of pictures of the Nigerian film industry. For Permanent Error (2011) Hugo photographed the people and landscape of an expansive dump of obsolete technology in Ghana. There is a Place in Hell for Me and My Friends (2012) depicts Hugo's family and friends from South Africa in digitally manipulated black and white portraits that aim to explore the contradictions of racial classification based on skin colour. Kin (2014) places even greater emphasis on the photographer's family and community which Hugo describes as "an engagement with the failure of the South African colonial experiment and my sense of being 'colonial driftwood'."

The Journey (2014) is a series of infrared images of sleeping passengers taken on a sixteen-hour flight from Johannesburg to Atlanta. Hugo prefaces the work which was presented both as an exhibition (2014) and newspaper format publication (2015) with a reflective monologue on the way that infrared images from the first invasion during the Iraq War have shifted associations with the medium from wildlife photography to conflict zones, and how contemporary surveillance has effectively challenged notions of the privacy and ownership of one's representation. In the Spring of 2014, Hugo was commissioned by Creative Court to work in Rwanda for its "Rwanda 20 Years: Portraits of Reconciliation" project. The project was displayed in The Hague in the Atrium of The Hague City Hall for the 20th commemoration of the 1994 genocide in Rwanda. A selection of the photos have also been displayed in New York at the exhibition Post-Conflict which was curated by Bradley McCallum, artist in residence for the Coalition for the International Criminal Court. The project served as the impetus for the photographic series 1994 (2017) which explores the post-revolutionary era in both South Africa and Rwanda through a series of portraits of children from both countries.

Flat Noodle Soup (2016) chronicles Hugo's lengthy engagement with the city of Beijing, exploring how concerns with expressing personal identity within societal norms and pressures are universal and trans-national. La Cucaracha is a 2019 body of work made during four trips to Mexico over a two-year period. The photographic series explores Hugo's perception of the flamboyant and violent environment of Mexico with overt art historical references to the nation's visual canon of precolonial customs and revolutionary ideology.

== Personal life ==
As of 2013, Hugo was married to film editor Tamsyn Reynolds, with whom he has two children.

== Publications ==
=== Publications by Hugo ===
- Looking Aside. Punctum, 2006. ISBN 978-88-95410-00-5.
- The Hyena & Other Men Munich: Prestel, 2007. ISBN 978-3791339603. With an essay by Adetokunbo Abiola.
- Messina/Musina. Munich: Punctum, 2007. ISBN 978-88-95410-03-6. With a short story by Stacy Hardy, "The Donkey Fuckers", and a conversation between Hugo and Joanna Lehan.
- Nollywood. Munich: Prestel, 2009. ISBN 978-3791343129. With texts by Chris Abani, Stacy Hardy and Zina Saro-Wiwa.
- Rwanda 2004: Vestiges of a Genocide. London; Paris: oodee, 2011. ISBN 978-0-9570389-0-5. Edition of 500 copies. With an essay by Linda Melvern.
- Permanent Error. Munich: Prestel, 2011. ISBN 978-3791345208.
- This Must Be The Place: Selected Works. Munich: Prestel, 2012. ISBN 978-3791346892. With essays by TJ Demos and Aaron Schuman.
- J-SEK. London: One League, 2012. Produced by Hugo and Louis Vuitton with an essay by Montle Moorosi II.
- There's a Place in Hell for Me and My Friends. London; Paris: oodee, 2012. ISBN 978-095703-892-9.
- Kin. New York: Aperture, 2014. ISBN 978-1597113014. With a short story by Ben Okri.
- The Journey. Self-published, 2015. Newspaper format.
- Flat Noodle Soup Talk. Paris: Bessard, 2016. ISBN 979-10-91406-48-2. Edition of 500 copies. Photographs made in Beijing.
- PH&HBA. Pieter Hugo in collaboration with Hood by AIr. 2016. ISBN 9780955084089. London: See W.
- 1994. Munich: Prestel. 2017. ISBN 978-3-7913-8273-9. With text by Ashraf Jamal.
- Pieter Hugo. Between the Devil and the Deep Blue Sea. 2017. ISBN 978-3-7913-8384-2 Ralf Beil & Uta Ruhkamp (ed.) Munich: Prestel
- La Cucaracha. Barcelona: RM, 2019. ISBN 978-84-17975-15-9. With essays by Mario Bellatin and Ashraf Jamal. Edition of 1500 copies.
- Solus Vol.1. Barcelona: RM, 2022. ISBN 978-84-17975-75-3.

=== Books and catalogues ===
- Ewing, William; Nathalie Herschdorfer and Jean-Christophe Blaser. 2005. reGeneration: 50 Photographers of Tomorrow 2005–2006. New York: Aperture. ISBN 978-1931788984.
- Matt, Gerald et al. 2006. Black, Brown, White: Photography from South Africa. Vienna: Kunsthalle Wien. ISBN 978-3938821336.
- Ewing, William (ed). 2006. Face: The New Photographic Portrait. London: Thames & Hudson. ISBN 978-0500287323.
- Yildiz, Adnan et al. 2007. An Atlas of Events. Lisbon: Fundação Calouste Gulbenkian
- Hug, Alfonso et al. 2008. The Tropics: Views from the Middle of the Globe. Bielefeld: Kerber. ISBN 978-3866781665.
- Dempsey, Kate (ed). 2008. Presumed Innocence. Lincoln, Massachusetts: DeCordova Museum and Sculpture Park. ISBN 978-0945506560.
- De Cultura, Área, and Ajuntament de Tarragona (eds). 2009. Pieter Hugo: Selected Works. Tarragona: Tinglado 2. ISBN 978-84-935674-6-0.
- Cresci, Mario (ed). 2009. Future Images. Milan: 24 ORE Cultura. ISBN 978-8864130170.
- Blackwell, Lewis. 2009. Photo-wisdom: Master Photographers on Their Art. Auckland: PQ Blackwell. ISBN 9780473150945.
- Maggia, Filippo et al. 2010. Breaking News: Contemporary Photography from the Middle East and Africa. Milan: Skira. ISBN 978-8857206455.
- Enwezor, Okwui (ed). 2010. Contemporary African Photography from the Walther Collection. Events of the Self: Portraiture and Social Identity. Göttingen: Steidl. ISBN 978-3-86930-157-0.
- Celant, Germano and Melissa Harris (eds). 2010. Immagini Inquietanti. Milan: La Triennale di Milano. Exhibition catalogue.
- Rubenstein, Bonnie, et al. 2011. Figure + Ground. Contact Photography Festival. Toronto: Scotiabank. 2011 Festival Catalogue.
- Ovesen, Solvej Helweg and Katerina Gregos (eds). 2011. The Eye is a Lonely Hunter: Images of Humankind. 4. Fotofestival Mannheim Ludwigshafen. Heidelberg: Kehrer. ISBN 978-3868282405.
- Krifa, Michket and Laura Serani (eds). 2011. For A Sustainable World. Rencontres de Bamako African Photography Biennial, 9th Edition. Arles and Paris: Actes Sud and Institut Français. ISBN 978-2330001551.
- Kemfert, Beate and Christina Leber (eds). 2011. Road Atlas: Street Photography from Helen Levitt to Pieter Hugo. Munich: Hirmer. ISBN 978-3777439617.
- Herschdorfer, Nathalie. 2011. Afterwards: Contemporary Photography Confronting the Past. London: Thames & Hudson. ISBN 9780500543986.
- Gavin, Francesca. 2011.100 New Artists. London: Laurence King. ISBN 978-1856697347.
- Garb, Tamar. 2011. Figures & Fictions: Contemporary South African Photography. Göttingen and London: Steidl and V&A. ISBN 9783869302669.
- Fabiani, Francesca. 2011. Re-cycle. Strategie per l'architettura, la città e il pianeta. Rome: MAXXI and Elekta. ISBN 978-8837088965.
- Beckmann, Anne-Marie and Freddy Langer. 2011. XL Photography 4: Art Collection. Deutsche Börse. Ostfildern: Hatje Cantz. ISBN 978-3775728027.
- Markus Brüderlin (ed.), 2013. Art & Textiles: Fabric as Material and Concept in Modern Art from Klimt to the Present, 2013. Exhibition catalogue. Kunstmuseum Wolfsburg. Ostfildern: Hatje Cantz.
- Nine Weeks. Cape Town: Stevenson, 2016. ISBN 978-0-620-69507-7. Pieter Hugo in conversation with Hansi Momodu-Gordon.
- Jamal, Ashraf. 2017. 'Giants'. In the World: Essays on Contemporary South African Art. Skira: Milan. ISBN 978-8857235639

== Exhibitions ==
=== Solo exhibitions ===
- 2004: The Albino Project, Galleria Nazionale d'Arte Moderna, Rome, Italy, 2004; Fabrica Features, Lisbon, Portugal, 2004.
- 2007: Messina/Musina, Standard Bank Young Artist Award 2007 touring exhibition, National Arts Festival, Grahamstown, South Africa; Nelson Mandela Metropolitan Museum, Port Elizabeth; Durban Art Gallery, Durban; Oliewenhuis Art Museum, Bloemfontein; Iziko South African National Gallery, Cape Town; National Gallery, Cape Town, South Africa, 2008
- 2007: Pieter Hugo: The Hyena & Other Men, Foam Fotografiemuseum Amsterdam, Netherlands, 2008; Herzliya Museum of Contemporary Art, Herzliya, Israel, 2010; Photographic Centre Peri, Turku, Finland, 2010; Multimedia Art Museum, Moscow, 2012
- 2008: Nollywood, Johannesburg, South Africa, 2008; Australian Center for Photography, Sydney, Australia, 2009; Institute of Modern Art, Brisbane, Australia, 2010;
- 2008: Portraits, Open Eye Gallery, Liverpool, UK, 2008; Ffotogallery, Cardiff, UK, 2008
- 2008: Pieter Hugo: Selected Works, Tinglado 2, Tarragona, Spain, 2008 Tinglado 2, Tarragona, Spain, 2009.
- 2010: On Reality and Other Stories, Le château d'eau, pôle photographique de Toulouse, Toulouse, France, 2010; Forest Centre Culturel, BRASS, Brussels, Belgium, 2010
- 2010: Permanent Error, Scotiabank CONTACT Photography Festival, Toronto, Canada, 2011;
- 2013: This must be the place – Selected works 2003–2012, Museum Ludwig, Budapest
- 2015: Portraits: From the unsaid to the un-dead, Institute of Contemporary Art Indian Ocean, Mauritius
- 2015: In Focus, National Portrait Gallery, London
- 2015–2016: Fondation Cartier-Bresson, Paris, 2015;
- 2017: Between the Devil and the Deep Blue Sea, Kunstmuseum Wolfsburg, Wolfsburg, Germany.
- 2017: Verisimilar Worlds: The West African Works 2005–2010, Organ Vida International Photography Festival, Museum of Contemporary Art, Zagreb, Croatia.
- 2017–2018: Between the Devil and the Deep Blue Sea, Museum für Kunst und Kulturgeschichte, Dortmund, Germany,2017; Museu Coleção Berardo, Lisbon, Portugal, 2018.
- 2018: Aquí se rompió una taza, Centro Fotográfico Álvarez Bravo, Oaxaca, Mexico
- 2019: Africa to China, Pékin Fine Arts, Hong Kong, China.
- 2019–2020: La Cucaracha, Huxley Parlour, London, 2020

=== Group exhibitions ===
- 2010: Life Less Ordinary: Performance and display in South African art, Ffotogallery, Cardiff, Wales
- 2010: 1910–2010: From Pierneef to Gugulective, Iziko South African National Gallery, Cape Town, South Africa
- 2010: Lie of the Land: Representations of the South African Landscape, Iziko Old Town House Museum,
- 2010: After A, Photo Notes on South Africa, Atri Reportage Festival, Atri, Italy
- 2010: Disquieting Images, Triennale di Milano, Milan, Italy
- 2010: Counterlives, Ackland Art Museum, University of North Carolina at Chapel Hill, Chapel Hill, NC
- 2011: Figures and Fictions: Contemporary South African Photography, Victoria and Albert Museum, London
- 2011: For a Sustainable World, African Photography Encounters Bamako, Mali
- 2011: The Global Contemporary: Art Worlds after 1989, ZKM Center for Art and Media Karlsruhe, Germany
- 2011: The Eye is a Lonely Hunter: Images of Humankind, Fotofestival Mannheim Ludwigshafen Heidelberg, Germany
- 2011: ARS 11, Kiasma, Helsinki Museum of Contemporary Art, Helsinki, Finland
- 2011: Lens: Fractions of Contemporary Photography and Video in South Africa, Stellenbosch University Art Museum, South Africa
- 2011: Il corpo metafora di un'esperienza, CIAC Centro Italiano Arte Contemporanea, Foligno, Italy
- 2011: Contact Photography Festival, Toronto, Canada
- 2011: Beguiling: The Self and the Subject, Irma Stern Museum, Cape Town, South Africa; Contact Photography Festival, Toronto, Canada
- 2011: All Cannibals, Me Collectors Room, Berlin, Germany
- 2011: Paraty em Foco photography festival, Brazil
- 2012: Bienal de Fotografía de Lima, Peru
- 2012: FotoTriennale.dk, Funen, Denmark
- 2012: Moscow Photobiennale, Moscow Multimedia Art Museum, Moscow
- 2012: International Art Exhibition, Rwesero Arts Museum, Nyanza, Rwanda
- 2012: Qui Vive? 3rd Moscow International Biennale for Young Art, Moscow
- 2012: Photography of The Rainbow Nation, Beelden aan Zee, The Hague, the Netherlands
- 2012: Africa, There and Back, Museum Folkwang, Essen, Germany
- 2012: Transitions – Social Landscape Project, Market Photo Workshop, Johannesburg, South Africa
- 2012: Deutsche Börse Photography Prize 2012, The Photographers' Gallery, London
- 2012: Distance and Desire: Encounters with the African Archive Part II: Contemporary Reconfigurations, The Walther Collection Project Space, New York City
- 2013: Nothing to Declare?, Academy of Arts, Berlin, Germany
- 2013: Landmark: The Fields of Photography, Somerset House, London
- 2013: Either/Or, Nikolaj Copenhagen Contemporary Art Center, Denmark
- 2013: The Glorious Rise and Fall ... (and so on), Groot Ziekengasthuis, 's-Hertogenbosch, the Netherlands
- 2013: Distance and Desire: Encounters with the African Archive, The Walther Collection, Ulm, Germany
- 2013: Transition: Social Landscape, Rencontres d'Arles festival, Arles, France
- 2013: Present Tense, Calouste Gulbenkian Foundation, Lisbon, Portugal; Fundação Calouste Gulbenkian – Délégation en France, Paris
- 2013: Art and Textile: Fabric as Material and Concept in Modern Art from Klimt to the Present, Kunstmuseum Wolfsburg, Germany
- 2014: Public Intimacy: Art and Social Life in South Africa at the Yerba Buena Center for the Arts, San Francisco, USA
- 2014: Apartheid and After, Huis Marseille, Museum for Photography, Amsterdam, the Netherlands
- 2014: Present Tense, Galeria Municipal Almeida Garrett, Porto, Portugal
- 2014: Here Africa, Château de Penthes, Geneve-Pregny, Switzerland
- 2014: Animalis, Fundació Forvm per la Fotografia, Tarragona, Spain
- 2014: T.R.I.P. Travel Routes in Photography, Baths of Diocletian, Rome, Italy
- 2014: Prospect.3: Notes for Now (P.3), New Orleans Biennial, USA
- 2015: Prix Pictet: Disorder, Musée d'Art Moderne de Paris, Paris; Somerset House, London; et al.
- 2015: I will go there, take me home, Metropolitan Arts Centre, Belfast, Northern Ireland, UK
- 2015: Beastly/Tierisch, Fotomuseum Winterthur, Switzerland
- 2015: Strange Worlds, Fondazione Fotografia Modena, Foro Boario, Modena, Italy
- 2016: A Closer Look: Portraits from the Paul G Allen Family Collection, Pivot Art + Culture, Allen Institute, Seattle, USA
- 2016: Regarding Africa: Contemporary Art and Afro-Futurism, Tel Aviv Museum of Art, Israel
- 2017: Lavoro in Movimento/Work in Motion, MAST Foundation, Bologna
- 2017: Good Hope. South Africa and The Netherlands from 1600, Rijksmuseum, the Netherlands
- 2017: 10 Years Old 2007–2017: A History of the World Told Through the Images of the Fondazione Cassa, di Risparmio di Modena Collection, Fondazione Fotografia Modena, Foro Boario, Italy
- 2017: Up to Now. Fabrica Photography, Fondazione Palazzo Magnani, Reggio Emilia, Italy as part of Time maps. Memory, archives, future, Fotografia Europea Festival
- 2017: AFRICA. Telling a world, Padiglione d'Arte Contemporanea, Milan, Italy
- 2017: Dangerous Art, Haifa Museum of Art, Israel
- 2018: Another Kind of Life: Photography on the Margins, Barbican Art Gallery, London
- 2018: In This Imperfect Present Moment, Seattle Art Museum, Washington, USA
- 2018: Troubled Intensions Ahead: Confusing Public and Private, 3rd Beijing Photo Biennial, China
- 2018: Civilization: The Way We Live Now, National Museum of Modern and Contemporary Art, Seoul, South Korea; Ullens Center for Contemporary Art in Beijing, China; the National Gallery of Victoria, Melbourne, Australia; and the National Museum of Civilization, Marseille, France.
- 2018: Hacer Noche (Crossing Night), Oaxaca, Mexico
- 2018: Recent Histories / Contemporary African Photography and Video Art from The Walther Collection, Huis Marseille, Amsterdam, the Netherlands
- 2019: Unseen: 35 Years of Collecting Photographs, J. Paul Getty Museum, Los Angeles, CA
- 2019: Here We Are Today: A View of The World in Photography & Video Art, Bucerius Kunst Forum, Hamburg, Germany
- 2019: Crossing Night: Regional Identities x Global Context, Museum of Contemporary Art Detroit, MI
- 2019: IncarNations: African Art as Philosophy, Centre for Fine Arts, Brussels, Brussels, Belgium
- 2020: Through an African Lens: Sub-Saharan Photography from the Museum's Collection, Museum of Fine Arts, Houston, Houston, Texas
- 2020: Civilisation, Photography, Now, Auckland Art Gallery Toi o Tāmaki, Auckland, New Zealand.
- 2020: Five Stories, One Point of View, MUSAC Collection, Museo de Arte Contermporáneo de Castilla y León, León, Spain.
- 2020: Allied with Power: African and African Diaspora Art from the Jorge M. Pérez Collection, Pérez Art Museum, Miami, FL.
