= Tayo Fatunla =

British-born Nigerian cartoonist, comic artist

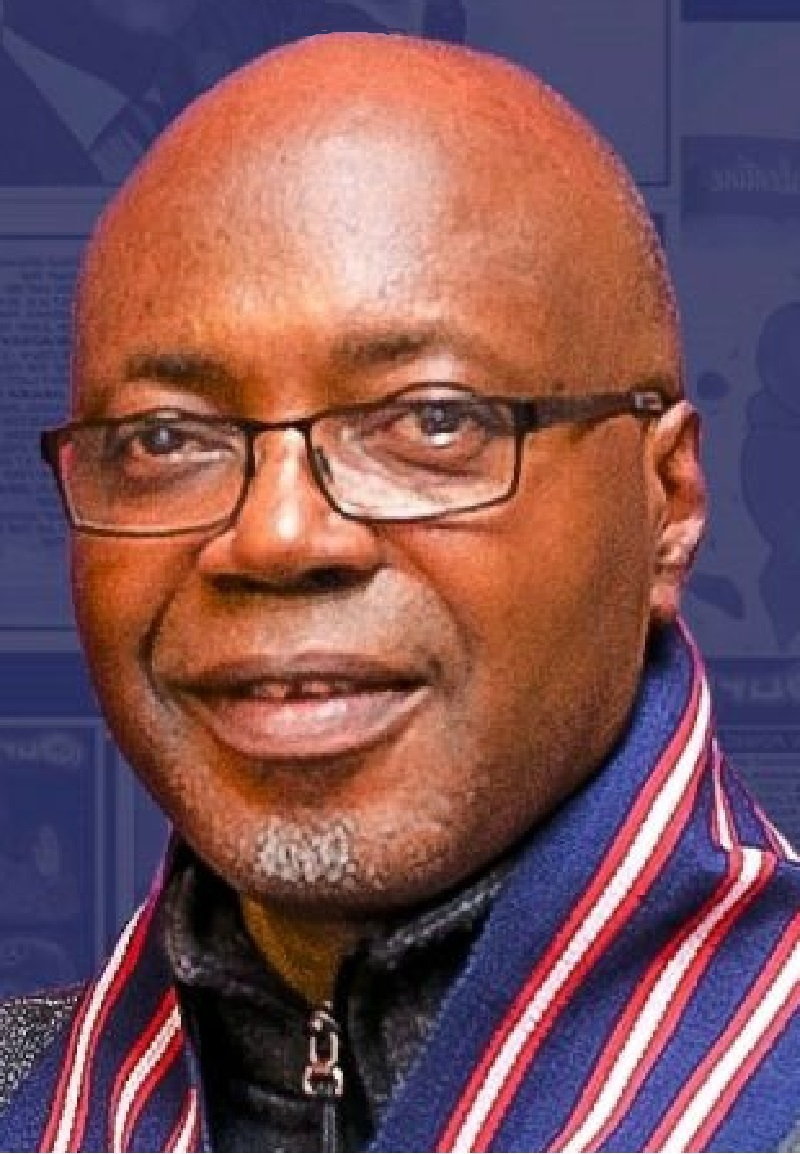
- Born: Tayo; 1961 (age 64–65); Wimbledon, England
- Citizenship: Nigeria
- Notable work: 'Our Roots' 1989, 'Hooked' 'Spirit of Lagos' 2015
- Awards: East Coast Black Age of Comics Convention (ECBACC) Pioneer Lifetime Achievement Award 2018; Crayon de Porcelaine
- Honours: "Cartoonist of the Black World"
- Website: tayofatunla.com

Tayo Fatunla is a British-born Nigerian cartoonist, comic artist, illustrator and storyteller based in the United Kingdom. He began drawing cartoons in Nigeria as a teenager and has since become known for his educational comic features on African history and social issues. His notable works include the long-running Our Roots series (started in 1989) and other projects for the BBC and the Lagos State government.

== Early life ==
Fatunla was born in Wimbledon, England, in 1961 to Emmanuel Olushola Fatunla, a retired electrical engineer and distribution manager, and Marcelina Fatunla, a retired nurse and great-granddaughter of George S.A. Da Costa, a renowned Nigerian photographer and artist from the late 19th and early 20th centuries. He was raised and educated in Nigeria and the United States. His formative years were spent in Lagos, where he attended Surulere Baptist School and later Lagos Baptist Academy. It was during this time that he developed an interest in drawing cartoons. He credits his mother, who worked at Lagos University Teaching Hospital, with introducing him to British and American comics (such as Buster, Battle, and Marvel titles), which fuelled his passion for drawing.

As a teenager in Lagos, Fatunla began publishing his cartoons locally. His very first cartoon appeared in Apollo, a Nigerian children's magazine, when he was 17 years old. He soon drew cartoons and caricatures for major Nigerian newspapers and magazines. For example, he worked for Punch newspaper (including the popular "Omoba" comic column), as well as other titles like Concord, The Guardian, and Daily Times. These early years in Nigeria established his reputation as a cartoonist and set the stage for his later career.

== Education ==
After beginning his career in Nigeria, Fatunla moved to the United States for formal art training. In the early 1980s he attended the Joe Kubert School of Cartoon and Graphic Art in Dover, New Jersey, becoming the first African student and graduate of that institution. It was at Kubert that he developed his signature style and conceived his educational comic projects. His Our Roots series, for example, started as a school project (originally titled African Sketchbook) under the guidance of tutors including Joe Kubert and Hy Eisman. Fatunla attributes much of his professional development to the training and mentorship he received at the Kubert School.

== Career and achievements ==
After completing his studies, Fatunla returned to Nigeria and continued his career as a cartoonist and illustrator. Over the decades he has worked for a wide range of international publications. He has drawn cartoons for The New York Times and the BBC's Focus on Africa magazine and contributed illustrations to British and African magazines such as West Africa, New African, The Voice, African Business, and Courrier International. He has also published collections of his own cartoons, including a retrospective book, Tayo – Thro' The Years, launched in London in 2001.

Fatunla's most famous project is the Our Roots series – an educational comic feature on Black history. Our Roots debuted in 1989 in London's The Voice newspaper and has run continuously for decades. The series, which highlights the accomplishments of Black people around the world, was later syndicated in American newspapers (such as the Chicago Defender, Sacramento Observer, and New York Amsterdam News). A collected volume of Our Roots was published in 1991. In recognition of this work, Fatunla was honored as "Cartoonist of the Black World" and in 2018 received the East Coast Black Age of Comics Convention (ECBACC) Pioneer Lifetime Achievement Award for Our Roots. Fatunla's comics often illustrate African history and culture. For example, his Our Roots series (1989–present) explores the lives of notable Black figures worldwide. These drawings were used for educational purposes in textbooks and exhibitions. In another project, he was commissioned by the Lagos State Government to produce Spirit of Lagos (2015), an illustrated comic about the history of Nigeria's largest city.

Fatunla has also created work for educational and cultural institutions. He illustrated Hooked (2015), an award-winning digital comic for the BBC World Service about drug abuse in West Africa. He drew a series of ten cartoons for the British Museum's online Wealth of Africa resource, depicting historical African kingdoms. In the UK he contributed to the Guardian's Illustrated Cities series, creating artwork on Lagos. One of his cartoon portraits (of musician Fela Kuti) even appears in the music video for Burna Boy's hit song "Ye" (2018). Throughout his career, Fatunla has exhibited and taught cartooning around the world. He has held gallery exhibitions and led workshops in countries including the United Kingdom, Nigeria, Côte d'Ivoire, Finland, France, Ethiopia, Spain, the United States, Egypt, Israel, Algeria, Belgium, South Korea, Italy and Ireland. His cartoons are part of permanent collections such as the International Museum of Cartoon Art (Florida, USA). In recognition of his work, he has won several awards: for example, he received the French press cartoon award Crayon de Porcelaine (Salon International du Dessin de Presse, St-Just-le-Martel), the ECBACC Pioneer Lifetime Achievement Award (2018), and in 2024 was named "Professional Creative Cartoonist of the Year" at the Building Blocks Initiative Awards in the UK. Peers have noted his influence on younger African cartoonists such as Godfrey Mwampembwa (Gado). Fatunla’s illustrations for Action Against Hunger were featured in the 2024 award‑winning film Conflict is the Main Driver of Hunger, which received Gold and Silver honours at the w3 Awards. The video depicts conditions in a displacement camp in Somalia and includes animation by Adam Zygadlo. He also illustrated the Camberwell Black History Walk, a self-guided tour that highlights sites in Camberwell associated with notable individuals of colour. The tour and its accompanying map have since become a permanent feature at Camberwell Park in Southeast London. In 2025, the Cartoon Festival of Saint‑Just‑le‑Martel collaborated with Limoges International Airport in Bellegarde, west‑central France, to mount a month -long exhibition of Fatunla’s cartoons in the airport concourse.

== Personal life ==
Fatunla is based in Kent in England, where he works as a cartoonist and illustrator. He remains deeply involved in the cartooning community, holding memberships in the Cartoonists Association of Nigeria (CARTAN), Politicalcartoons.com, and France Cartoons. Fatunla actively conducts cartoon workshops and lectures on storytelling and art. As a devout Christian, he often integrates his faith into his art, using it in church and educational settings. Notably, he produced Christian cartoon collections, such as "Gospel Humor" in 2016. Fatunla frequently discusses the influence of faith and culture on his work. Despite residing abroad, he maintains strong connections to Nigeria, regularly returning to lead festivals, conduct workshops, and publish his work in outlets like The Nation newspaper.
