= University of Maryland School of Nursing Living History Museum =

Museum in Baltimore, Maryland

The University of Maryland School of Nursing Living History Museum is located in Baltimore, Maryland, United States, and is dedicated to sharing the rich history and heritage of the nursing profession. The Museum features hundreds of original objects and photographs, as well as compelling audio and video presentations. The Museum traces the evolution of the School of Nursing’s mission in nursing education, research and practice from its early years as a hospital training school to its emergence as a premier professional school.

The Museum highlights the rarely acknowledged historical contributions of nurses, challenges widespread myths and misconceptions about nursing, and explores the contemporary role of nurses as health care providers. It is an opportunity for visitors to encounter—many for the first time—the untold story of American nursing through the experiences of University of Maryland nurses from the School’s founding in 1889 to the present.

The University of Maryland School of Nursing Living History Museum is located at 655 W. Lombard Street, Baltimore, MD.
