= Institute on the Arts and Civic Dialogue =

Organizations established in 1997

The Institute on the Arts and Civic Dialogue (IACD) was founded in 1997 by actress, playwright, and professor Anna Deavere Smith. Its mission was to support the development of art that illuminates social conditions; to deepen the capacity of artists to communicate with their audiences; and to build an international community in which artists, students, activists, and scholars could work together to develop the artist as a voice in society.

From 1998 to 2000, Smith and The Ford Foundation, the institute's principal funder, selected Harvard University as the IACD home base for six-week-long summer intensives. Hosted by the university's American Repertory Theater and the W.E.B. Du Bois Institute for Afro-American Research, the Institute brought together artists, scholars, activists, and audiences to develop and discuss works of art about vital social issues. This unique "think-and-do-tank" presented workshop versions of productions, exposing the process of creation and fostering civic discourse on the themes expressed by the work.

Activities included development of new works of art, group discussions, guest speakers, seminars and workshops for participants and selected guests, collaborative research, master classes, public forums and media projects. The institute's artistic focus included theater, dance, jazz music, song, opera, fine arts, installation and performance art, film and video. While the Institute still exists today, its activities have changed since relocating to New York City. It is restructuring.
