= Carroll Mansion =

Historic house in Maryland, United States

- U.S. National Register of Historic Places
- Baltimore City Landmark
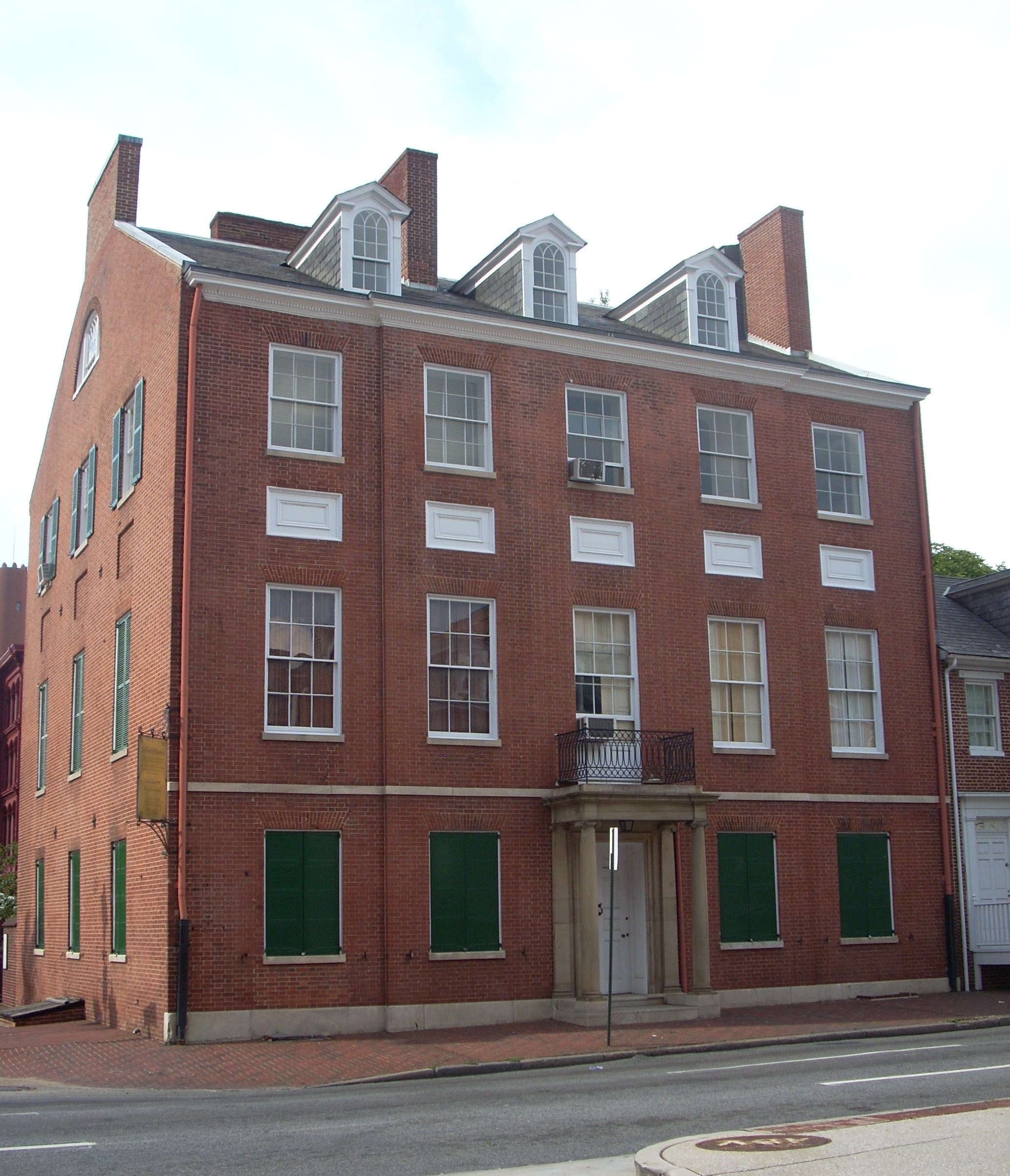
- Carroll Mansion in 2011

- Location within Baltimore Location within Maryland Location within the United States
- Location: 800 E. Lombard St., Baltimore, Maryland
- Coordinates: 39°17′18.8″N 76°36′16″W
- Area: 4 acres (1.6 ha)
- Built: 1811
- Architectural style: Federal, Late Federal
- NRHP reference No.: 73002182

Significant dates
- Added to NRHP: May 25, 1973
- Designated BCL: 1971

The Carroll Mansion, also known as the Carroll-Caton House, Caton-Carroll Mansion, or Carroll Mansion Museum, is a historic building and museum located in Baltimore, Maryland, United States. It is often cited as the finest example of Federal-period architecture in Baltimore.

== History ==
The house was built around 1811, at the corner of what is now known as Lombard and Front Streets, which at the time was a very wealthy part of Baltimore. In 1818 it was purchased for the sum of $20,000 by Richard Caton, the husband of Mary, youngest daughter of Charles Carroll of Carrollton, a signer of the Declaration of Independence. For the last twelve years of his life, Charles Carroll spent his winters in the house, often receiving distinguished visitors there. It was in this house that he died.

The Catons continued to reside at the mansion until 1846, when the last of the Caton family died.

The mansion remained empty for the next eleven years and was purchased in 1855 by the Sisters of Mercy. The neighborhood underwent a drastic change in the eleven years prior to 1855 and had gone from the wealthiest part of town to the home of poor immigrants. The Sisters of Mercy rented the once grand mansion to immigrants who turned the first floor into a saloon and the second floor into apartments for German and Russian Jews, until 1868 when the Sisters sold the mansion for the paltry sum of $1,000.

Over the next forty years, Carroll Mansion served as a saloon, furniture store, and in 1904 news articles report that the mansion was being used as a sweatshop to produce clothing.

In 1914 the mansion was deeded to the City of Baltimore and in 1918 it became Baltimore's first vocational school. The mansion's larger rooms were used as classrooms and the grounds housed the various trade shops. The vocational school continued to operate and offer courses in tailoring, printing, and auto mechanics until 1928. In 1928 the Carroll Mansion was restored and opened to the public with exhibits of antiques.

The Carroll Mansion underwent major renovations in 1935 to include showers, indoor toilets, and a new heating system and served as The Carroll Mansion Recreation Center from 1937 to 1954, at which time the doors were closed once again.

In the 1960s the mansion was slated to be torn down and a gas station built where the mansion stood for the last 150 years. The citizens of Baltimore protested said plans, and upon his election in 1962, on a platform emphasizing urban renewal, Mayor Theodore McKeldin pledged that the historic Carroll Mansion would be fully restored. After major restoration efforts, the doors of the Carroll Mansion opened to the public once again in 1967 as a museum and a collection of antiques to mirror the 1820s and 1830s when the Caton and Carroll families occupied the mansion was started. In 1985 the mansion became part of the Baltimore City Life Museums and the collection was expanded to include wallpaper, paint, china, silver, and furniture of the 1820s and 1830s. The mansion operated as a museum for thirty years, from 1967 to 1997, when the doors closed yet again.

The museum remained closed until 2002 when Carroll Museums, Inc. reopened the museum. The Carroll Mansion remains open today where tours are offered to the public. Changing art exhibits are also displayed. Currently, the museum is managed by Poe-Baltimore, and hosts a rotating set of exhibits on the Poe family and their connections to other famous individuals, as well as regular concerts, art exhibitions, and other presentations.

== Architecture ==
The Carroll Mansion is one of Baltimore's best examples of Federal Period architecture. It was listed on the National Register of Historic Places in 1973.

== Current Management ==
The Carroll Mansion is currently managed by Poe-Baltimore on behalf of the City of Baltimore. In the fall of 2024, the mansion became host to the Poe Death Exhibit, the Raven Room featuring a 20-foot mural by painter Michael Kirby, and a series of dioramas exploring the history of the Poe family with Lafayette.
