= Reginald F. Lewis Museum of Maryland African American History & Culture =

Museum in Baltimore, Maryland, US

Reginald F. Lewis Museum

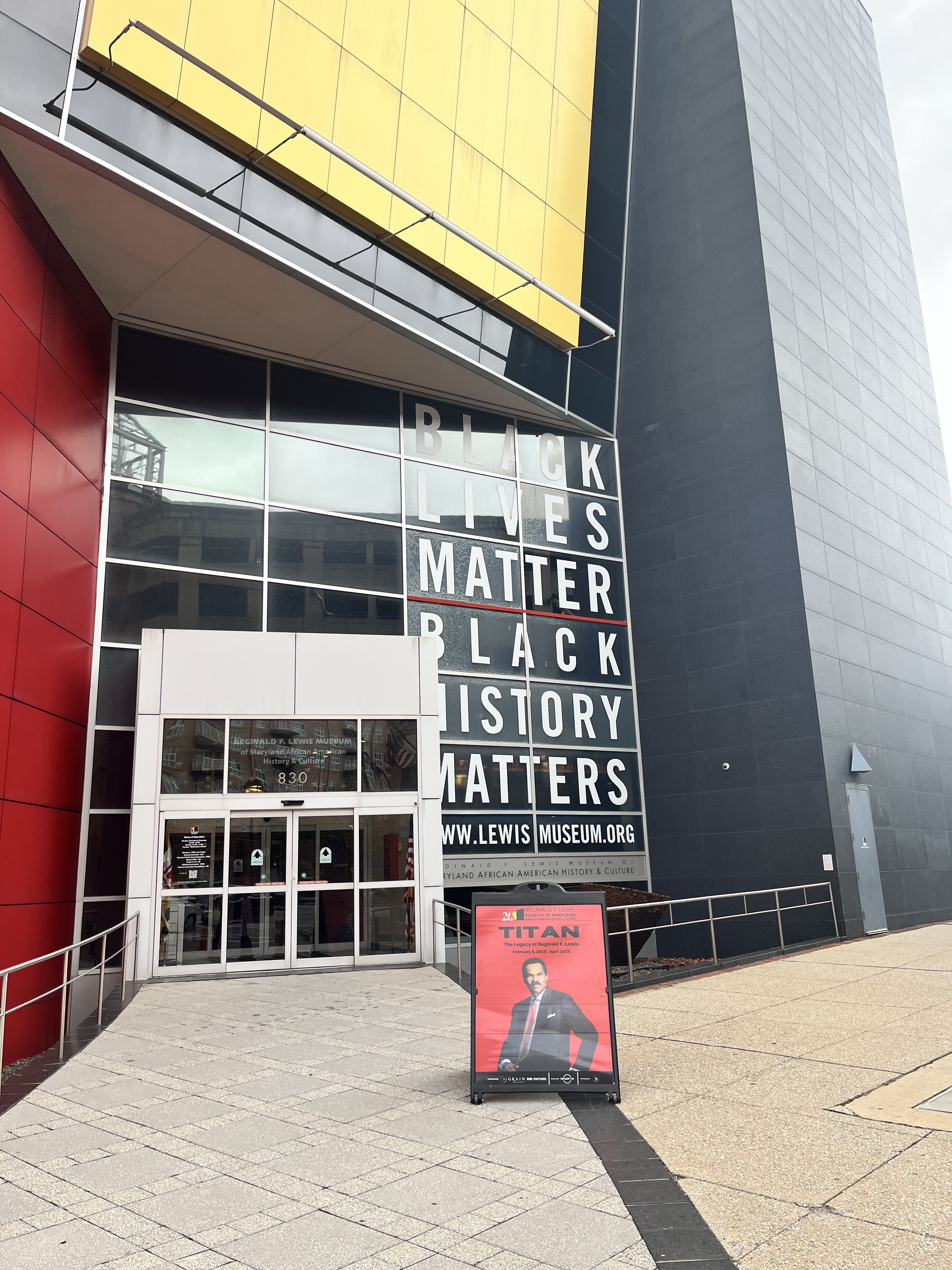
- Established: 2005
- Location: 830 East Pratt Street; Baltimore, Maryland 21202; United States
- Coordinates: 39°17′15″N 76°36′14″W
- Director: Terri Lee Freeman
- Website: https://www.lewismuseum.org

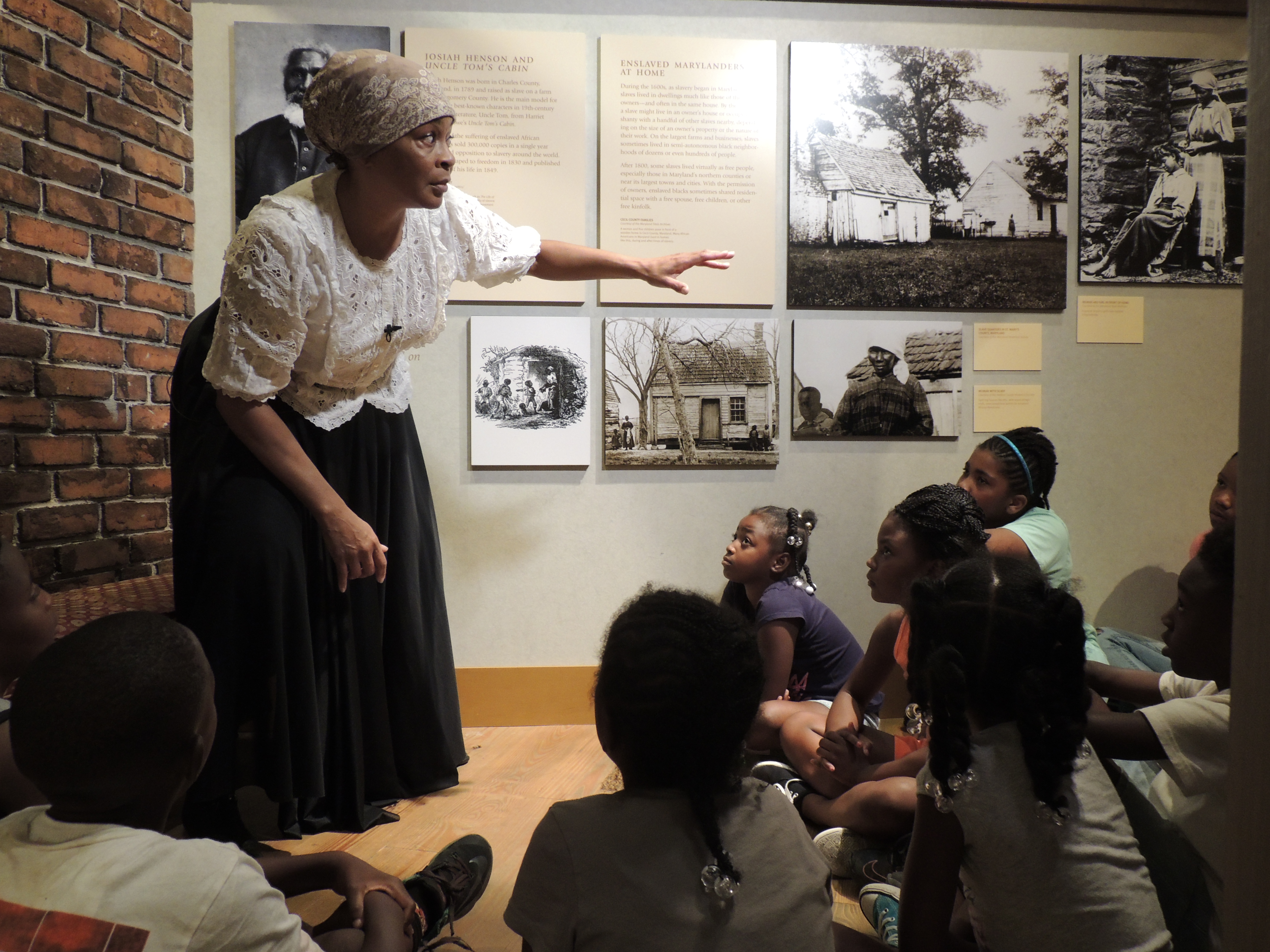
Reginald F. Lewis Museum Living History Tour

The Reginald F. Lewis Museum of Maryland African American History & Culture is a resource in Baltimore, Maryland, for information about the lives and history of African American Marylanders. Its collections comprise 400 years of Maryland history and include more than 11,000 objects, artifacts, documents and photographs. The museum opened in 2005 and is an affiliate of the Smithsonian Institution.

Funds for construction of the museum came in steps. A government appropriation of $31 million was approved on the condition that $1.5 million be raised from outside sources first. Baltimore Orioles owner Peter G. Angelos donated the entire $1.5 million. Subsequently, large companies pledged additional funding, the most significant pledge coming from the Reginald F. Lewis Foundation. This gift of $5 million was earmarked for educational programming and prompted the museum's founder, George L. Russell Jr., and its board of directors to name the museum after Lewis.

Reginald F. Lewis was the first African American to build a billion-dollar company, TLC Beatrice International Holdings. Starting from humble beginnings in Baltimore, Lewis in 1991 was listed among the 400 richest Americans by Forbes, with a net worth estimated at $340 million.

The five-story, 82,000 square foot museum, designed by architects Phil Freelon and Gary Bowden, greets visitors with the vibrant colors of the Maryland state flag, which begin on the outside of the building and circle around to the inside. Reflecting on the use of the flag's colors in the museum design, Bowden said, "We saw the museum's site was next to the [Star Spangled Banner] Flag House, and that's where we got the idea of re-interpreting the Maryland Flag--we Afrocentrized it." Facilities in the museum include an oral history recording and listening studio, a special exhibition gallery, a 200-seat theater auditorium, a classroom, and resource center.

Permanent exhibits explore Maryland's African American history through the themes of family and community, labor, and art and intellect. Past exhibitions include "A Slave Ship Speaks: The Wreck of the Henrietta Marie", the work of artists Romare Bearden and Jacob Lawrence, and "Make Good Trouble: Marching for Change", which featured rapid response collecting of artifacts during the COVID 19 pandemic and Black Lives Matter movement.

The museum's executive director is Terri Freeman. She has held the post since 2021.

== See also ==
- History of the African Americans in Baltimore
- List of museums focused on African Americans
