= Maryland Art Place =

Contemporary art gallery in Baltimore, Maryland, US

Coordinates: 39°17′22.34″N 76°36′25.71″W

The Maryland Art Place is a not-for-profit contemporary art gallery in Baltimore, Maryland, U.S.A. established in 1981. The gallery is located at 218 West Saratoga Street within the Bromo Tower Arts and Entertainment District on Baltimore's west side.

MAP offers changing exhibits each year that are open free to the public. MAP develops six to eight exhibitions a year with programs designed to complement each exhibition. Annual programs include: Curators' Incubator, a program that fosters new curatorial talent; Out of Order, a free-hang exhibition and silent auction; and Young Blood, an exhibition of works by recent MFA graduates. Other activities include gallery talks, artist lectures, and workshops. Other programs include artist and curator talks, a Speakers Series, workshops, and internship and volunteer programs. MAP also houses the 14Karat Cabaret, a performance space, and maintains the Maryland State Arts Council (MSAC) Visual Artists’ Registry.

The 14Karat Cabaret, located at 218 W. Saratoga Street in Baltimore, is an artist-run program of Maryland Art Place that offers a series of performance, music, dance, film and video in an informal setting.
