= Contemporary Museum Baltimore =

Museum in Maryland, United States

The Contemporary
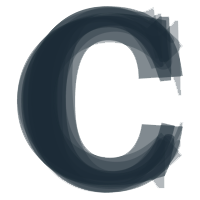
- Former name: Contemporary Museum
- Established: 1989
- Dissolved: 2012; re-established 2013
- Location: Baltimore, Maryland
- Coordinates: 39.2964°N 76.6179°W
- Type: peripatetic
- Key holdings: none
- Collections: none
- Founder: George Ciscle
- Website: contemporary.org

The Contemporary is an itinerant museum of contemporary art in Baltimore, Maryland, in the United States. It does not collect artworks. It was started as the Contemporary Museum by George Ciscle in 1989. During its first decade, it had no fixed home, but instead was "dedicated to redefining the concept of the museum". It sponsored exhibitions in a variety of non-traditional spaces around Baltimore, as well as borrowing space in partnering institutions such as the Baltimore Museum of Art, Maryland Historical Society, Peabody Conservatory and Walters Art Museum.

In 1999, the Contemporary Museum moved to 100 W. Centre Street, one block from the Walters, in the Mount Vernon neighborhood of downtown Baltimore, where it organized exhibitions and related programming for nearly ten years. In 2011, the museum moved out of the W. Centre Street space and organized projects in neighboring institutions and buildings.

The museum suspended operations in 2012, but in September 2013 announced that it would re-open under a new name, The Contemporary, after a year spent "reimagining the organization's mission, vision and operating structure".
