= Coalition for the International Criminal Court =

International network of NGOs

- Founded: February 1995
- Type: Non-profit; NGO
- Purpose: To facilitate the access and involvement of civil society in ASP and ICC processes
- Location(s): Secretariats in New York and The Hague
- Services: Advocacy
- Members: 2,500 non-governmental organizations
- Website: https://www.coalitionfortheicc.org

The Coalition for the International Criminal Court (CICC) is an international network of NGOs, with a membership of over 2,500 organizations worldwide advocating for a fair, effective and independent International Criminal Court (ICC). Coalition NGO members work in partnership to strengthen international cooperation with the ICC; ensure that the court is fair, effective and independent; make justice both visible and universal, and advance stronger national laws that deliver justice to victims of war crimes, crimes against humanity and genocide.

== History ==
The coalition was founded in 1995 by a small group of NGOs that coordinated their work to ensure the establishment of an international criminal court. The founders decided to house the Secretariat of the movement with the World Federalist Movement, and Mr. William Pace, at that time Director of the WFM, was appointed Convenor for the Coalition.

Since then, the Coalition's membership has progressively increased as its original goal of establishing the ICC grew to include the larger goal of guaranteeing the court's fair, effective, and independent functioning. Over the years, the Coalition Secretariat and its global membership have worked together at every stage of the court's development, from the preparatory committees for the establishment of the court, to the Rome Conference that established the court, to the annual Assembly of States Parties meetings. Milestones in the coalition's work include the participation in and monitoring of the 1998 Rome Conference, resulting in the adoption of the Rome Statute of the ICC; the statute's rapid entry into force on July 1, 2002; and the election of the court's senior officials, completed in June 2003. The role of the coalition was recognized by the Assembly of States Parties when it adopted a resolution entitled Recognition of the coordinating and facilitating role of the NGO Coalition for the International Criminal Court (ICC-ASP/2/Res.8) during its second session in September 2003.

In 2019, Mr. William Pace stepped down as CICC Convenor after almost 25 years.

=== Steering committee ===
A core group of well-known and respected NGOs form the Steering Committee of the Coalition, which provide policy and program coherence for the Coalition’s efforts and activities. Adapting and adjusting to political developments, the Steering Committee helps guide the work of the coalition's secretariat, serving as an advisory body not only to provide global policy coherence, but to ensure cooperation and provide crucial strategic oversight. Each of these organizations has its own ICC programs, staff and resources.

=== Membership ===
In 1995, the CICC consisted of 25-member organizations, but today—with a global membership of more than 2500 organizations—the Coalition has become a major actor in the global fight to end impunity. Coalition members represent vast geographic and thematic interests, including human rights, women's issues, children's rights, peace, international law, humanitarian assistance, the rights of victims, faith-based issues, and disarmament.

=== Regional and national networks ===
The Coalition for the ICC has established strong national and regional networks all over the world. The CICC national coalitions and regional networks typically comprise a diverse range of civil society groups working within a single country or region, including NGOs, academics, lawyers, and bar associations. Through these networks, strategic plans to achieve the goals of this campaign, in particular ratification and implementation of the Rome Statute, and widespread education about the court and the statute, are developed and carried out.

By 2009, there were 14 national coalitions in Asia and the Pacific, 14 in Europe, 21 in Africa, 11 in the Middle East and North Africa, and nine in Latin America, for a total of 69 national coalitions advocating for the ICC.

The CICC secretariat's regional section, its regional coordinators based around the world and its outreach liaisons in New York City, support the development and capacity-building of the CICC networks and work closely with them at every stage.

=== NGO teams and issues ===
The CICC monitors a wide range of issues relating to the work of the ICC through issue-specific teams and working groups composed of NGO representatives. Membership to these teams is open to all CICC members.

Currently these include topics such as:

- Budget and finance
- Building - ICC premises
- Children
- Communications and outreach
- Cooperation agreements and enforcement
- Crimes of aggression
- ICC and ASP Elections
- Gender justice
- Legal representation
- Recruitment of ICC staff
- Review conferences
- Strategic planning
- Trust funds for victims

Purpose

- The key purpose of the teams is to help coordinate and focus the input of member NGOs on particular issues, and to facilitate the efficient division of labor among NGO experts. Most teams have a designated leader and a CICC secretariat focal point that helps coordinate the work. Teams operate on the principles of collaboration and transparency, and respect the diversity, mandates and independence of members. Teams monitor key developments related to their particular area of focus and recommend strategies to be considered by the coalition as a whole or by individual members.

Background

- The coalition's team structure developed informally during the 1995-1998 Ad Hoc and Preparatory Committee meetings leading up to the Rome Conference. The structure was formally implemented during the Rome Conference during which 13 teams monitored various aspects of the statute, the final act and the preamble. Throughout the preparatory commissions and the Assembly of States Parties, the teams worked in conjunction with the coalition's steering committee, sectoral caucuses, working groups such as the Faith and Ethics Network and the Victims’ Rights Working Group, and regional teams working on issues such as ratification and implementation as well as regional and national networks.

== Regional campaigns ==
The coalition advocates for universal ratification of the Rome Statute of the ICC as it is a cornerstone objective to making the membership in the ICC truly global and universal. The CICC believes that in order for the court to succeed, an increasing majority of the world's nations must support the court.

In particular, the coalition has a Universal Ratification Campaign (URC) which focuses on one country each month, rotating to a different region each time. As part of this major campaign, members in every region are encouraged to redouble efforts in order to ensure universal acceptance of the ICC. Local actions are needed to promote awareness of the International Criminal Court, increase media coverage, urge governments to ratify the Rome Statute, adopt effective implementing legislation, and ratify the Agreement on Privileges and Immunities.

The CICC also campaigns for implementation of all of the crimes under the Rome Statute into domestic legislation. As the court initiates new investigations, the existence of solid cooperation and implementing legislation has taken on further urgency.

In addition, the CICC is urging States to ratify and implement the Agreement on Privileges and Immunities of the ICC (APIC), designed to provide officials and staff of the ICC with certain privileges and immunities necessary for them to perform their duties in an independent and unconditional manner, and to guarantee that their officials are aware of the actual scope and realities of these privileges and immunities and how to apply them in concrete situations.

== Supporters ==
Current major funding is provided by the European Union, the Ford Foundation, the John D. and Catherine T. MacArthur Foundation, and the Open Society Institute, as well as by the governments of Belgium, Denmark, Finland, Liechtenstein, the Netherlands, Norway, Sweden, and Switzerland, and a number of individual donors.

== Publication and resources ==
The CICC has both electronic and print publications.

Tens of thousands of copies of print resources are distributed worldwide to government representatives, international organizations, academics, civil society groups, and individuals. They provide updates on developments at the court as well as at the Assembly of States Parties; reports on ICC-related events worldwide; details on new resources and upcoming events; and information about key issues related to the International Criminal Court.

- The Monitor is a bi-annual journal on worldwide ICC-related updates worldwide mailed to all members of the ICC and other interested parties. It is published in English, French, and Spanish.

CICC's publication The Monitor

- The ''CICC Bulletin'' is a bi-monthly online publication featuring updates on the work of the ICC and CICC, as well as on the progress of the four situations currently before the court. It is published in English, French, and Spanish.
- The ''MENA Update'' is a bi-annual online newsletter in Arabic providing updates on ICC -related issues in the Middle East and North Africa.
- The ''Europe Update'' is a bi-annual online newsletter with information on the latest ICC-related events in Europe.
- The ''Africa Update'' is a bi-annual online newsletter focused on ICC developments in Africa.

In Situ blog

- The ''Asia Update'' is a biannual online newsletter with information on ICC-related developments in Asia.
- The CICC blog “In Situ – See justice through the eyes of civil society”: in situ is Latin for "in the natural place", and refers to bringing international justice and trial proceedings home to affected communities. The coalition's blog endeavors to help bridge the gap between the populations affected by the crimes under the court's investigation and the ICC's daily activities at its headquarters in The Hague. In Situ features posts by some of the more than 2,500 members in 150 countries.

In addition to these publications and the CICC website (www.iccnow.org), the Coalition's electronic resources include information email lists in English, French, Spanish, and Portuguese to which daily postings are made. Summaries of all news coverage of the ICC, information on new ratifications of the statute and progress towards ratification, announcements of upcoming events, notes and reports on the Assembly of States Parties, and other critical information is made available through these lists.

== See also ==
- World Federalist Movement/Institute for Global Policy
- International Criminal Court
