= James Carroll (Maryland politician) =

American politician (1791–1873)

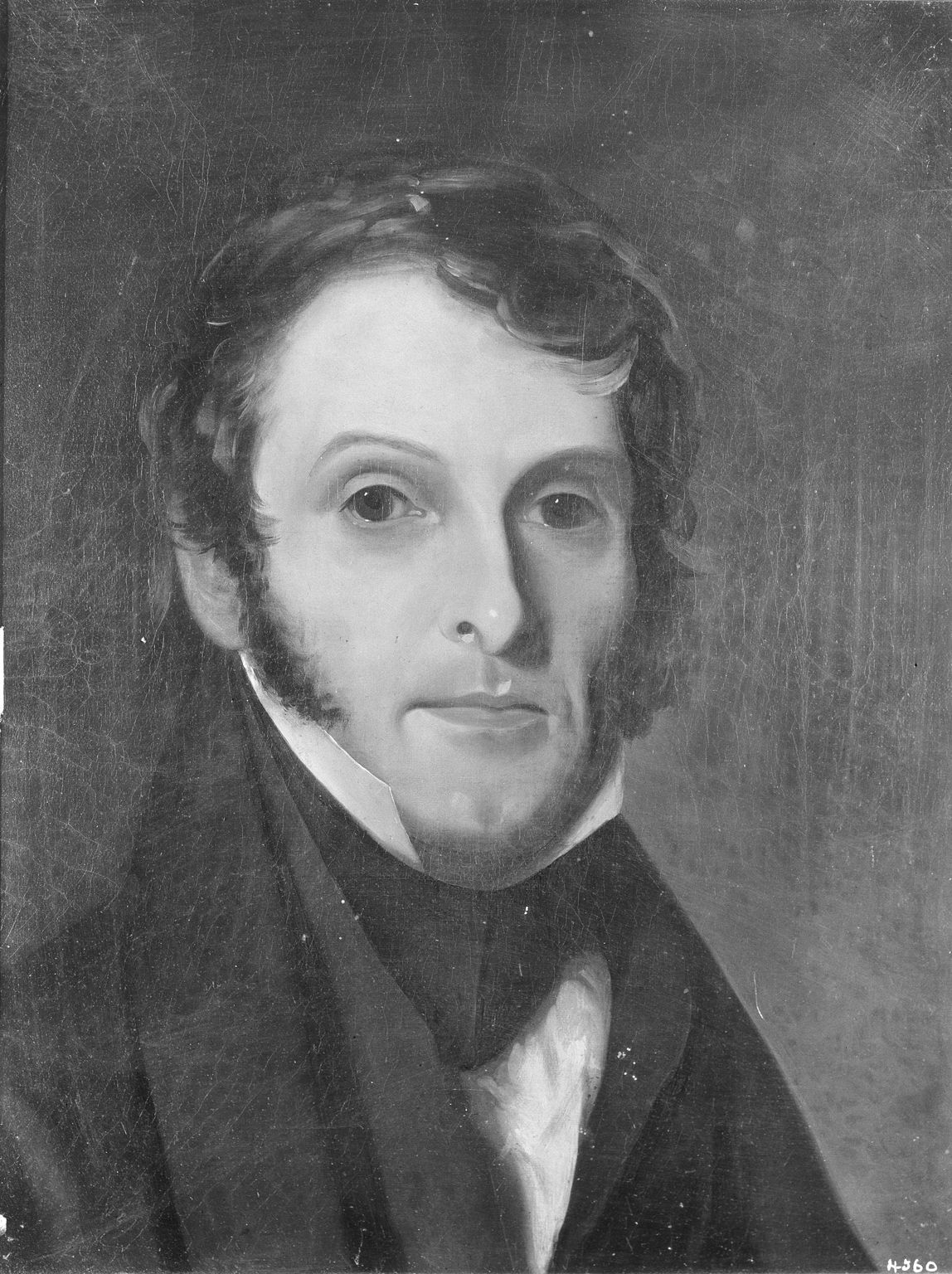
- Born: December 2, 1791; Baltimore
- Died: January 16, 1873 (aged 81); Baltimore
- Resting place: Old Saint Paul's Cemetery
- Political party: Democratic Party
- Spouse(s): Achsah Ridgely Carroll
- Children: Sophia Gough Carroll Sargent
- Parent(s): James MacCubbin Carroll; Sophia Gough Carroll
- Position held: United States representative

James Carroll (December 2, 1791 – January 16, 1873) was a Maryland politician and director of the Baltimore and Ohio Railroad and the Chesapeake & Ohio Canal Company.

== Early life ==
Carroll was born in Baltimore, Maryland, on December 2, 1791. He graduated from St. Mary's College in Baltimore in 1808. Carroll studied law, but did not practice. He settled on a farm on the West River, but later moved back to Baltimore. His reputation was improved when he became judge of the orphans' court and a trustee of the poor. He served as a director of the Baltimore and Ohio Railroad and the Chesapeake and Ohio Canal.

== Career ==
Carroll Vault

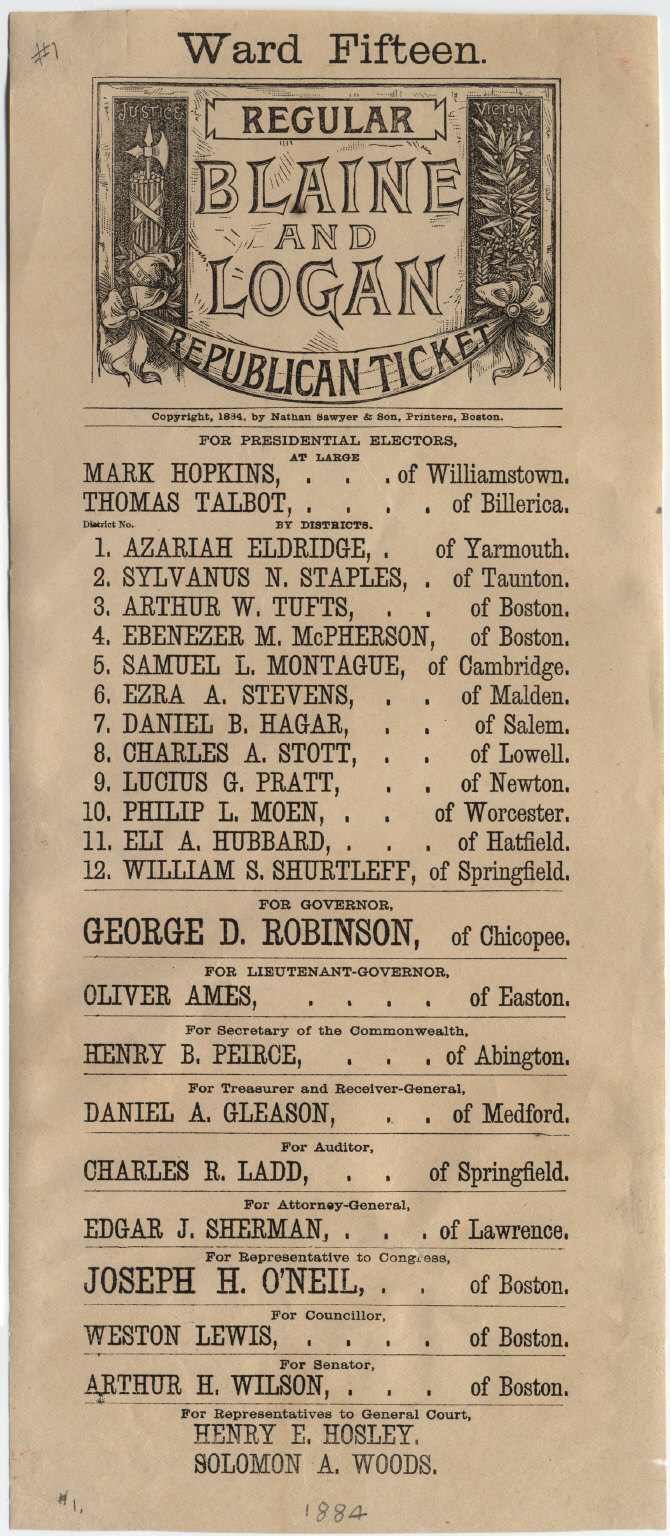
Campaign poster

Carroll was elected a Democrat to the Twenty-Sixth United States Congress to represent Maryland's Fourth District. He took seat in 1839, but had lost re-election and left in 1841. Carroll ran for Governor of Maryland in 1844, winning his party's nomination, but lost in the general election to Whig Thomas G. Pratt by a margin of a mere 548 votes.

== Death ==
He retired and died on January 16, 1873. He is interred in the Carroll vault in Old Saint Paul's Cemetery in Baltimore, Maryland.

He was a member of the Carroll family.

Party political offices
Preceded by Francis Thomas	Democratic nominee for Governor of Maryland; 1844	Succeeded by Philip Francis Thomas
U.S. House of Representatives
Preceded by Benjamin Chew Howard and John P. Kennedy	Member of the U.S. House of Representatives from Maryland's 4th congressional district March 4, 1839 – March 3, 1841; Served alongside: Solomon Hillen, Jr.	Succeeded by John P. Kennedy and Alexander Randall
