= Samuel Brady (Maryland politician) =

American politician (died 1871)

11th Mayor of Baltimore
- In office November 2, 1840 – March 9, 1842
- Preceded by: Sheppard C. Leakin
- Succeeded by: Solomon Hillen Jr.

Personal details
- Born: Delaware, U.S.
- Died: December 8, 1871 (aged 82) Baltimore County, Maryland, U.S.
- Party: Democratic
- Spouse: Ann Mary Proctor Stansbury
- Children: 8
- Occupation: Politician; businessman

Samuel Brady (died December 8, 1871) was Mayor of Baltimore from November 2, 1840 to March 9, 1842.

== Early life ==
Samuel Brady was born in Delaware. He moved to Baltimore, Maryland at an early age and entered the retail dry goods business. He owned a business on North Gay Street in Baltimore.

== Career ==
In 1834, Brady ran for the Maryland House of Delegates, but lost. In 1836, Brady was appointed City Collector by Mayor Samuel Smith. Brady served as a member of the First Branch of the Baltimore City Council for two one-year terms. In his second term, he served as president of the division. Brady ran as a Democrat for Mayor of Baltimore in 1840, defeating incumbent Sheppard C. Leakin. Brady became mayor on November 2, 1840. He served until March 9, 1842, resigning due to a disagreement with the City Council on the city's purchase of a large amount of Baltimore and Ohio Railroad stocks. Brady favored the investment, but City Council did not.

After serving as mayor, he ran for Maryland's 3rd congressional district in 1844, but lost to John Wethered. He then removed to Baltimore County. He was elected as County Commissioner of Baltimore County and held the position for many years.

== Personal life ==
Brady married Ann Mary Proctor Stansbury. They had eight children: Samuel Jr., Benjamin F., John W. S., Jefferson, Thomas S., Mary, Martha A. and Margaret.

Brady died on December 8, 1871, at his home in Baltimore County.

Preceded by Sheppard C. Leakin	Mayor of Baltimore; 1840–1842	Succeeded by Solomon Hillen Jr.
