= Montibello =

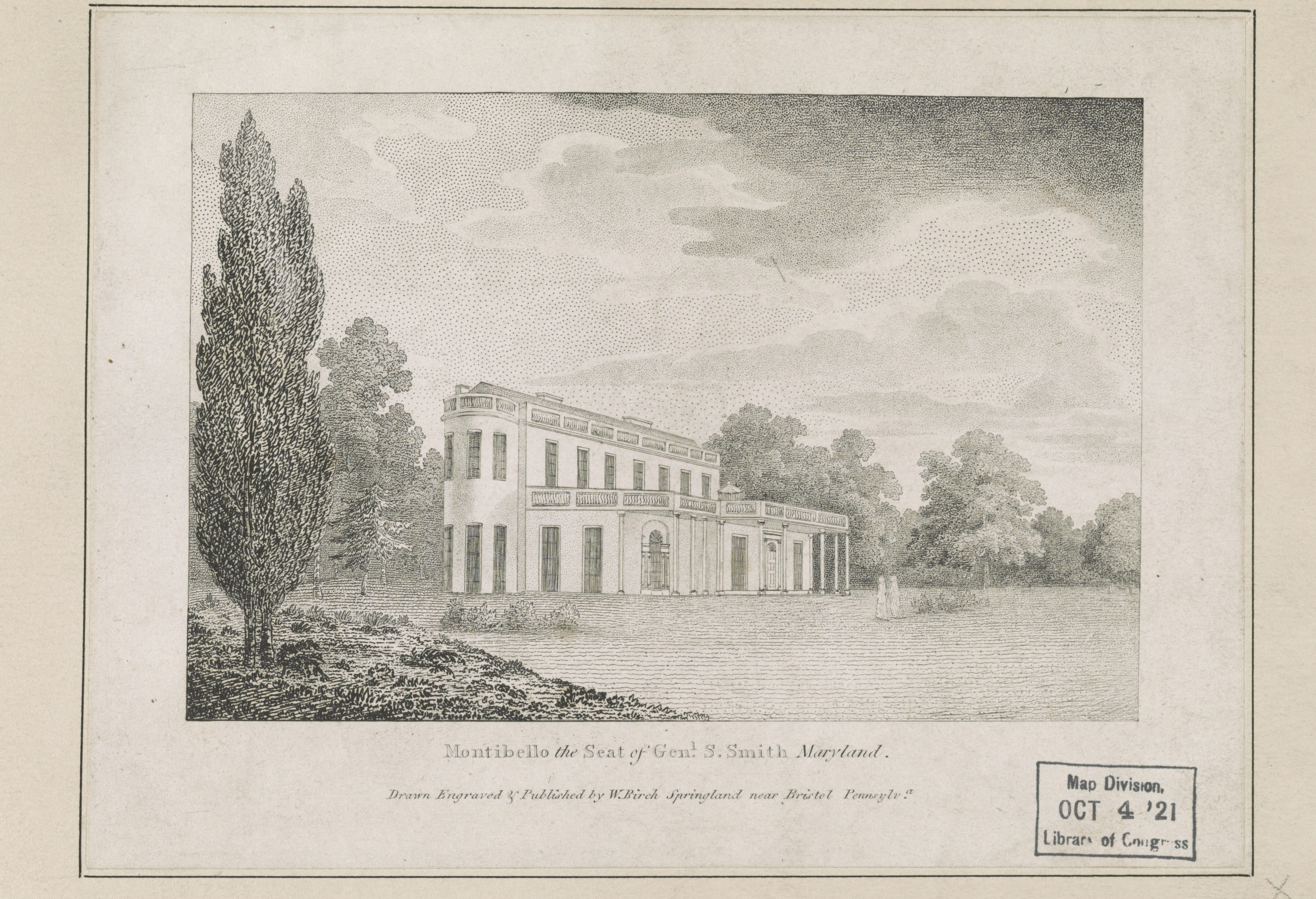

- Location within Maryland
- 39°19′41″N 76°35′02″W
- Nearest city: Baltimore, Maryland

History
- Built: 1799

Site notes
- Architectural style: Adam Style

Montebello (alternatively spelled Montibello) was the home of Maryland politician Samuel Smith, (July 27, 1752 – April 22, 1839). Located in Baltimore, Maryland, United States, was built in 1799 and torn down in 1907.

Smith served as a United States Senator and Representative from Maryland, a mayor of Baltimore, Maryland, and a general in the Maryland militia. He was the brother of cabinet secretary Robert Smith.

In 1808, the house was drawn by engraver William Birch and included in his text, The country seats of the United States of North America: with some scenes connected with them.

The house no longer stands. Today the site is a municipal water reservoir, Lake Montebello.

== See also ==
- Susquehanna Conduit
