= Mayfield, Baltimore =

- Mayfield Historic District
- U.S. National Register of Historic Places
- U.S. Historic district
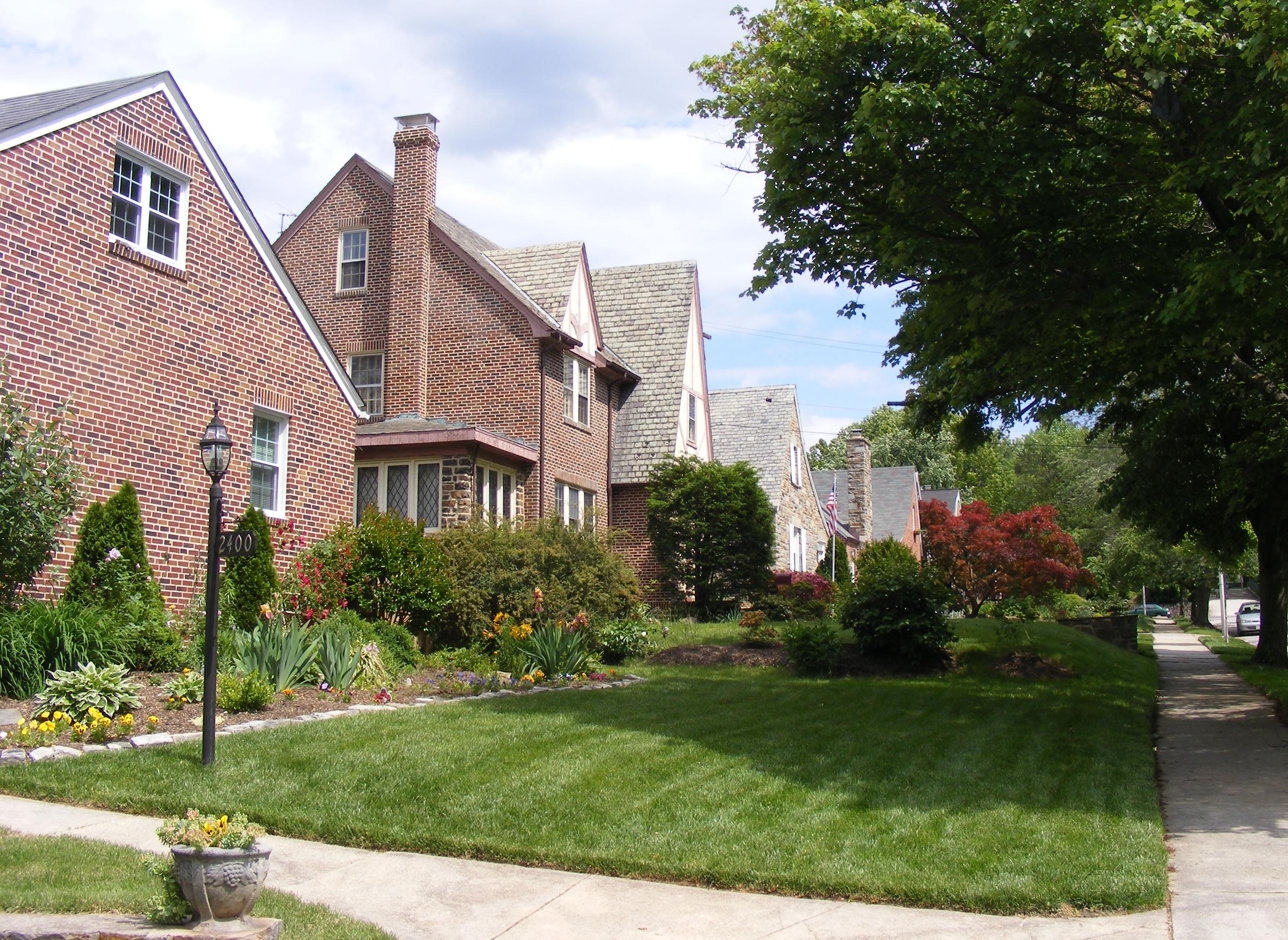
- Homes in Mayfield.

- Location within Baltimore Location within Maryland Location within the United States
- Location: Lake Montebello Rd.-Chesterfield Ave.,-Crossland Ave.-Erdman Ave., Baltimore, Maryland
- Coordinates: 39°19′49″N 76°34′48″W
- Area: 93 acres (38 ha)
- Architect: Eyring, John; et.al.
- Architectural style: Late 19th And 20th Century Revivals, Late 19th And Early 20th Century American Movements
- NRHP reference No.: 03001371
- Added to NRHP: January 6, 2004

Mayfield is a quaint and historic community in northeast Baltimore, Maryland. It is bounded by Erdman Avenue on the south, Chesterfield Avenue on the north, Crossland Avenue on the east and Lake Montebello on the north and west. Homeowners belong to the Mayfield Improvement Association.

== History ==
=== Colonial Period to Late Nineteenth Century ===
Mayfield evolved from a mid-to-late eighteenth century rural settlement along Harford Road, known during the colonial period as Darley Path, leading to Darley Hall, thought be a Tobacco Plantation. At one point, the Garretts, Ridgelys, Erdmans and other prominent Baltimoreans owned estates in what is now Mayfield, named after the Richmond Family estate. Farming centric businesses along Harford Road had access to the old Belair Market at Forrest and Gay Streets. Maps show the Erdman family owned much of the land which is now Mayfield in 1873. Several factors led to the desirability of residential development in this area in the late nineteenth century. A streetcar line was established on Harford Road, providing easy access to downtown Baltimore. Adjacent to Mayfield, the city established a reservoir, Lake Montebello, which provided the neighborhood with a picturesque setting. Johns Hopkins left his estate, Clifton, to the university named after him. The 1877 Hopkins Atlas shows Clifton as the Johns Hopkins University Grounds. Baltimore City later acquired the Clifton estate for use as a park and another reservoir, Lake Clifton.

=== Twentieth Century - Present ===
As Baltimore's urbanization continued, country estates and farmland transitioned to residential buildings. Mayfield's development tells the story of Baltimore's suburbanization. The community is an example of a kind of residential neighborhood which characterized the area in the late nineteenth and early twentieth centuries. Mayfield's historic district designation fills a gap in both chronology and geography, between the older, urbanized Baltimore East/South Clifton Park historic district to the south and the suburban Lauraville historic district to the north. By the 1940s, as Mayfield was nearing completion, the Mayfield Improvement Association was incorporated and the neighborhood boundaries were formalized. The Association was formed "to promote, maintain and develop the general welfare of residents, property and improvements," "to stimulate civic pride and community interests in all matters pertaining to the protection, advancement and general health and welfare of residents."

== Architecture ==
Mayfield is a residential neighborhood of approximately 16 city blocks in northeast Baltimore, four miles from downtown, roughly bounded by two city parks and a reservoir - Clifton Park, Herring Run Park and Lake Montebello. The district contains a variety of housing styles, including free-standing Victorian frame houses, small brick rows, large twentieth century suburban villas, and early to mid-twentieth century frame track houses and masonry duplexes. A variety of stone walls, fences, terraced lawns and private gardens are the main landscape features. Within the residential built environment of Mayfield are characteristic details representative of the quality of workmanship in homebuilding prevalent form the late nineteenth to mid-twentieth century. The attention to detail is witnessed throughout the neighborhood. Many houses display stained and leaded glass accent windows. Many porches are supported by classical columns or turned wood posts. Other architectural details include decorative shingles, bracketed door hoods, corbelled brickwork, slate and tile roofs, ornamental cornices and prominent chimneys.

== Demographics ==
According to the 2000 US Census, 955 people live in Mayfield with 77% White and 18.8% African-American. The median family income is $80,191. 94.9% of the houses are occupied and 85.1% of those are occupied by the home's owner.

== Schools ==
Mayfield has two elementary schools: Montebello Elementary (Public grade school K-5) and St. Francis of Assisi School (Catholic grade school K-8). St. Matthew's Christian Pre-School is available for children 3 and 4 years old. Public high school students generally attend nearby Mervo or City high schools.
