= Old Saint Paul's Cemetery =

United States historic place in Baltimore, Maryland

- St. Paul's Cemetery
- U.S. National Register of Historic Places
- Baltimore City Landmark
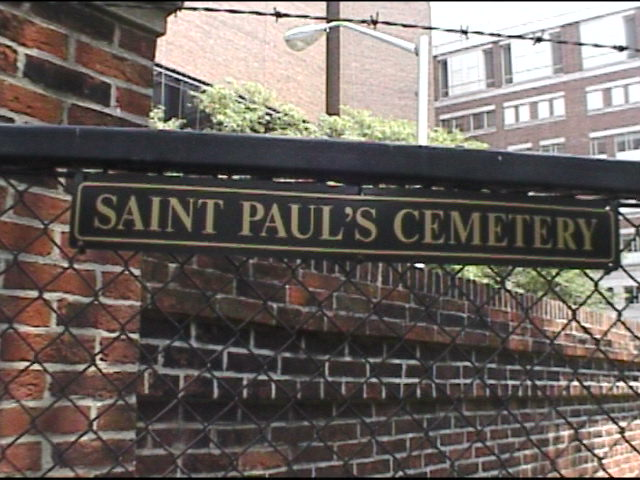
- Old Saint Paul's Cemetery
- Interactive map of St. Paul's Cemetery
- Location: Redwood Street and Martin Luther King Jr. Blvd., Baltimore, Maryland
- Coordinates: 39°17′16.2″N 76°37′39″W
- Area: 2.4 acres (0.97 ha)
- NRHP reference No.: 88000746

Significant dates
- Added to NRHP: June 30, 1988
- Designated BCL: 1986

Old Saint Paul's Cemetery is a cemetery located in downtown Baltimore, Maryland, United States. It is noted for the several important historical figures that are interred in its grounds.

It was listed on the National Register of Historic Places in 1988.

== History ==
The first cemetery of Saint Paul's Church (Protestant Episcopal) in Baltimore was located at the future intersection of Sollers Road and North Point Road in what is now the area of Dundalk in southeastern Baltimore County. The original small church of St. Paul's Parish of the established Church of England was one of the "Original Thirty" parishes designated for the colonial Province of Maryland and was founded in 1692 and considered to be one of the oldest churches in the State. In 1730, the Parish Church of St. Paul's was moved from near Colgate Creek on the "Patapsco Neck" peninsula to the new burgeoning town of Baltimore overlooking "The Basin" at the head of the Patapsco River on its Northwest Branch, and Lot #19 was purchased in the "Original Survey" of that year by county surveyor Phillip Jones from Charles Carroll of Annapolis.

As the designated parish for the new Baltimore County, which then included most of northeastern Maryland when it was "erected" (established) in 1659, the first St. Paul's was located around the vicinity of the lower Colgate Creek which flowed into the Patapsco River and is assumed that the cemetery would be located somewhere nearby. The church site was probably in the area of the future aviation sites of "Logan Field", "Baltimore Municipal Airport" (later known as "Harbor Field" after World War II), and now the grounds of the "Dundalk Marine Terminal" and "Sea Girt Marine Terminal" of the facilities for the Port of Baltimore Laid out in 1692, along with the Parish, this churchyard is the oldest cemetery that is known to have existed in the Baltimore metropolitan area.

About 1760, those remains were exhumed and moved to the new Saint Paul's Burial Ground which surrounded the original church, which was the first building in the new town to be built of brick and completed after 9 years of work in 1739 at Forest Street (now North Charles Street) and the intersecting east–west lane which later became East Saratoga Street after the American Revolution to commemorate the famous "turning point" battle in 1777 along the Hudson River in New York State. To the east lay the Jones Falls Bluffs which stood from 1739 to 1817, over the southwestward "loop" of the stream before its course was further north. Below the cliffs was another lane which was named for the church as "Saint Paul's Lane" (to become St. Paul Street and in the southern portion after construction of the terraced "Preston Gardens" in the 1920s, became known as Saint Paul Place. To the south at the then limit of the lot was laid out New Church Street which later became East and West Lexington Streets (also after the Revolution), one block south of the later church buildings. That building was replaced by another in (1812, 1813–17?) of Greek Revival design by famous local architect Robert Cary Long, Jr. which burned in 1854 and was later replaced by the present building in 1856 which fills that entire property, at the current intersection of North Charles and East Saratoga Streets.

In the late 18th century, the Vestry of Old St. Paul's Church was faced with the need for a third cemetery. Cemeteries had never been viewed as good neighbors, aside from the fact that they contained the bodies and souls of the departed (who, it was believed, had the ability to wander the land), they could become unsightly and even unhealthy.

Therefore, a new cemetery site was purchased in 1800 on the western edge of town. This site is bordered on the west by Martin Luther King Jr. Boulevard (Cove Street at the time of purchase, later Fremont Avenue), Lombard Street on the south, and Redwood Street (formerly German Street) on the north. Several members of the Vestry owned a great deal of undeveloped property in this area.

Church member Samuel Smythe purchased 2.8 acres (11,000 m^{2}) of land from the heirs of Alexander Robinson, whose house is found on the 1802 "Hanna and Warner" map of Baltimore, directly across German Street from the Smythe purchase. The land was subsequently bought by the Church. Many of the parishioners immediately bought grave lots and began construction of vaults and plots.

When Martin Luther King Jr. Boulevard was constructed, during the mid-1980s, one end of this cemetery was lost on the west side and the remains and markers were moved within the remaining walled cemetery that now sits surrounded by the University of Maryland, Baltimore campus.

== Persons of note interred ==
- George Armistead (1780–1818) – Brevet lieutenant colonel, U.S. Army; commander of Fort McHenry at the Battle of Baltimore during the War of 1812
- Lewis Armistead (1817–1863) – Confederate brigadier general during the Civil War; nephew of George Armistead. Wounded during Pickett's Charge at Gettysburg, died two days later.
- James Carroll (1791–1873) – US Congressman. Elected to represent Maryland's 4th District in the United States House of Representatives, serving from 1839 to 1841
- John Morton (American Politician) (1725–1777) – Signer of The Declaration of Independence
- Samuel Chase (1741–1811) – Signer of The Declaration of Independence from Maryland, Former Supreme Court Associate Justice, known as "Old Bacon Face"
- Jacob G. Davies (1795–1857), Mayor of Baltimore
- George Howard (1789–1846) – Governor of Maryland (1831–1833)
- John Eager Howard (1752–1827) – Revolutionary War Continental Army Officer, Continental Congressman, Governor of Maryland (1788–1791), Senator; father of George Howard
- Francis Scott Key (1779–1843) – Witness to the Battle of Baltimore during the War of 1812; writer of "The Star-Spangled Banner", later the national anthem. Cenotaph; reburied at Mount Olivet Cemetery in Frederick, Maryland, 1866
- Isaac McKim (1775–1838), U.S. representative from Maryland
- Alexander Reinagle (1756–1809) – composer, known as the "Master of Music"

== Gallery ==
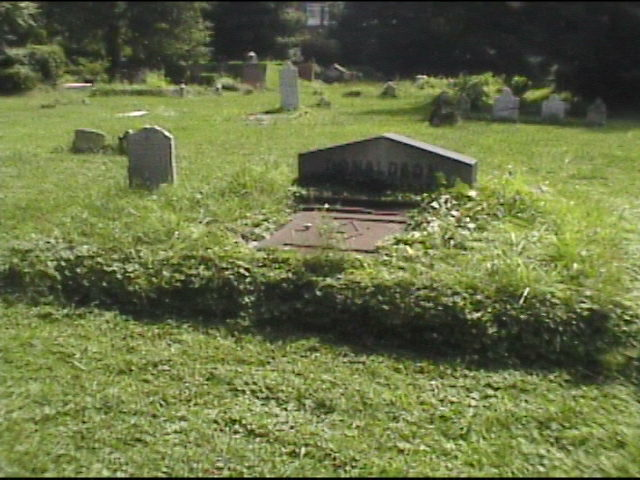
Old St. Paul's Cemetery

Carroll Family Vault

Howard Family Vault

== See also ==
- List of burial places of justices of the Supreme Court of the United States
- List of cemeteries in the United States
