= John P. Kennedy =

American novelist and politician (1795–1870)

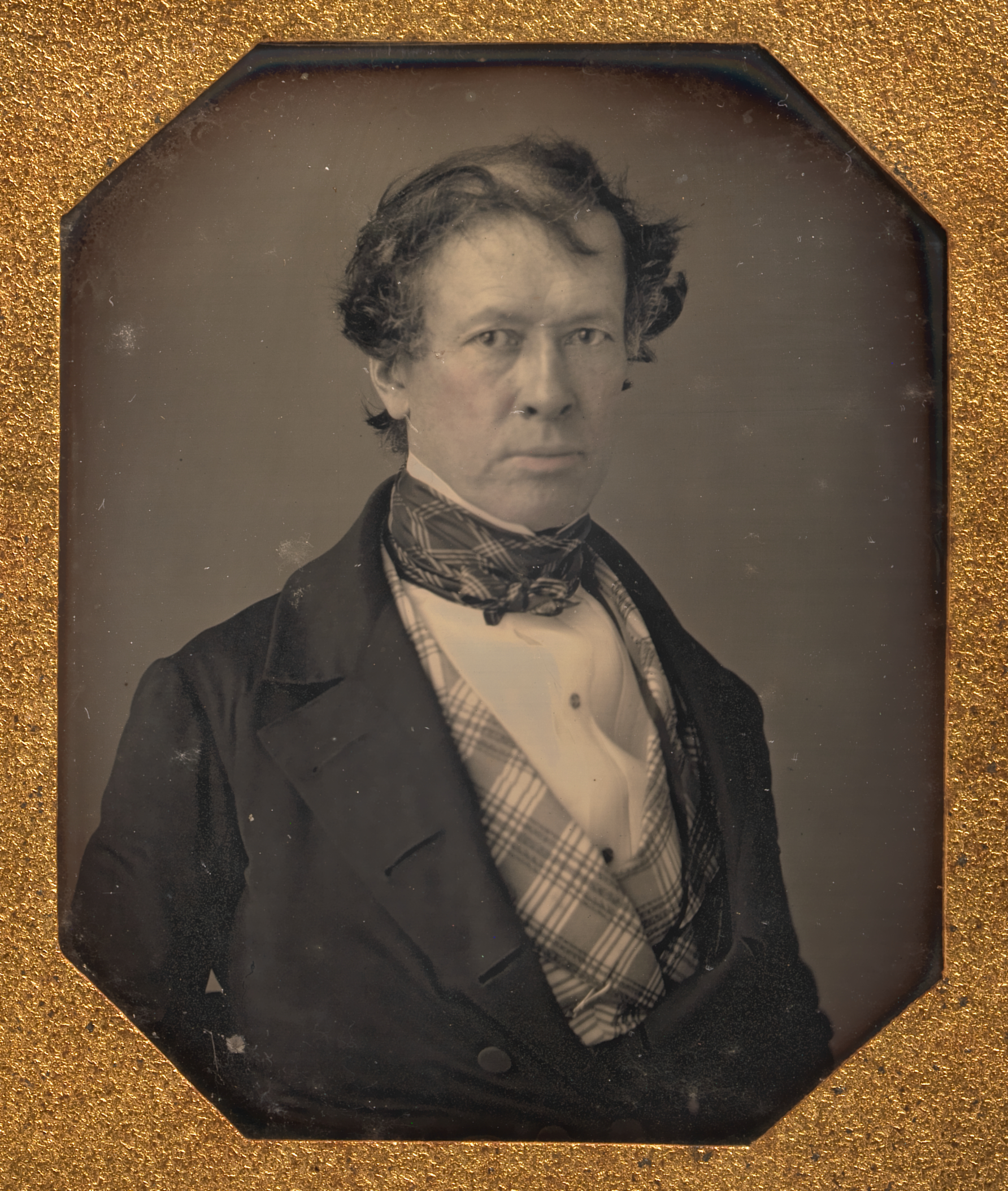

21st United States Secretary of the Navy
- In office July 26, 1852 – March 4, 1853
- President: Millard Fillmore
- Preceded by: William Graham
- Succeeded by: James C. Dobbin

Member of the U.S. House of Representatives from Maryland's 4th district
- In office March 4, 1841 – March 3, 1845
- Preceded by: Solomon Hillen Jr.
- Succeeded by: William Fell Giles
- In office April 25, 1838 – March 3, 1839
- Preceded by: Isaac McKim
- Succeeded by: Solomon Hillen Jr.

Speaker of the Maryland House of Delegates
- In office December 1846 – December 1847
- Preceded by: William S. Waters
- Succeeded by: William J. Blakistone

Member of the Maryland House of Delegates
- In office 1821–1823
- In office 1845-1847

Personal details
- Born: John Pendleton Kennedy; October 25, 1795 Baltimore, Maryland, U.S.
- Died: August 18, 1870 (aged 74) Newport, Rhode Island, U.S.
- Resting place: Green Mount Cemetery
- Party: Whig
- Spouse(s): Elizabeth Gray; Margaret Hughes
- Education: Baltimore College (BA)

Military service
- Allegiance: United States
- Branch/service: Maryland Militia
- Battles/wars: War of 1812; Battle of Bladensburg; Battle of North Point

John Pendleton Kennedy (October 25, 1795 – August 18, 1870) was an American novelist, lawyer and Whig politician who served as United States Secretary of the Navy from July 26, 1852, to March 4, 1853, during the administration of President Millard Fillmore, and as a U.S. representative from Maryland's 4th congressional district, during which he encouraged the United States government's study, adoption and implementation of the telegraph. A lawyer who became a lobbyist for and director of the Baltimore and Ohio Railroad, Kennedy also served several terms in the Maryland General Assembly and became its speaker in 1847.

Kennedy later helped lead the effort to end slavery in Maryland, which, as a non-Confederate state, was not affected by the Emancipation Proclamation and required a state law to free slaves within its borders and to outlaw the furtherance of the practice.

Kennedy also advocated religious tolerance, and furthered studies of Maryland history. He helped preserve or found Historic St. Mary's City (site of the colonial founding of Maryland and the birthplace of religious freedom in America), St. Mary's College of Maryland (then St. Mary's Female seminary), the Peabody Library (now a part of Johns Hopkins University) and the Peabody Conservatory of Music (also now a part of Johns Hopkins).

== Early life and education ==
John Pendleton Kennedy was born in Baltimore, Maryland, on October 25, 1795, the son of an Irish immigrant and merchant, John Kennedy. His mother, the former Nancy Pendleton, was descended from the First Families of Virginia family. Poor investments resulted in his father declaring bankruptcy in 1809. John Pendleton Kennedy attended private schools while growing up and was relatively well-educated for the time. He graduated from Baltimore College in 1812. His brother Anthony Kennedy would become a U.S. Senator.

== War of 1812 ==
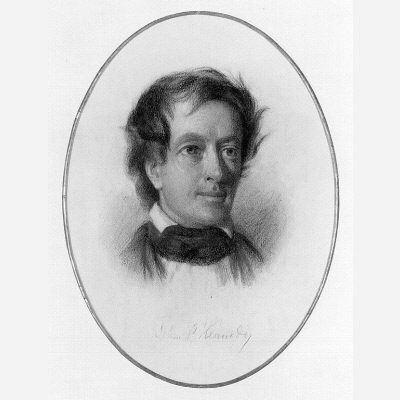
John Pendleton Kennedy as a young man.

Kennedy's college studies were interrupted by the War of 1812. He joined the army and in 1814, marched with the United Company of the 5th Baltimore Light Dragoons, known as the "Baltimore 5th," a unit that included rich merchants, lawyers, and other professionals. Kennedy wrote humorous accounts of his military escapades, such as when he lost his boots and marched onward in dancing pumps. The war was, however, serious, and Kennedy participated in the disastrous Battle of Bladensburg as the British threatened the new national capitol, Washington, D.C. Secretary of State James Monroe ordered the Baltimore 5th to move back from the left of the forward line to an exposed position a quarter-mile away. After the British forces crossed a bridge, the 5th moved forward. The fighting was intense: nearly every British officer among the advancing troops was hit, but then the British fired Congreve rockets. At first, the 5th stood firm, but when the two regiments to the right ran away, the 5th also broke. Kennedy threw away his musket and carried a wounded fellow-soldier (James W. McCulloh) to safety. Kennedy later fought in the Battle of North Point, which saved Baltimore from a burning similar to that of the Burning of Washington. Another wartime contact who proved crucial in Kennedy's later political and business career was George Peabody, who later helped finance the B&O Railroad and founded the House of Morgan, as well as the Peabody Institute.

== Law study and marriage ==
Kennedy spent his summers in Martinsburg, Virginia, where he read law under the tutelage of his relative Judge Edmund Pendleton (descendant of the patriot Edmund Pendleton, who sat on the Virginia Court of Appeals). Kennedy would later often allude to genteel life on Southern plantations based on his youthful summers in Martinsburg. Later, Kennedy inherited some money from a rich Philadelphia uncle, and in 1829 married Elizabeth Gray, whose father Edward Gray was a wealthy mill-owner with a country house on the Patapsco River below Ellicott's Mills, and whose monetary generosity would allow Kennedy to effectively withdraw from his law practice for a decade to write.

== Literary life ==
Although admitted to the bar in 1816, he was much more interested in literature and politics than law. He associated with the focal point of Baltimore's literary community, the Delphian Club. Kennedy's first literary attempt was a fortnightly periodical called the Red Book, published anonymously with his roommate Peter Hoffman Cruse from 1819 to 1820. Kennedy published Swallow Barn, or A Sojourn in the Old Dominion in 1832, which would become his best-known work. Horse-Shoe Robinson was published in 1835 to win a permanent place of respect in the history of American fiction.

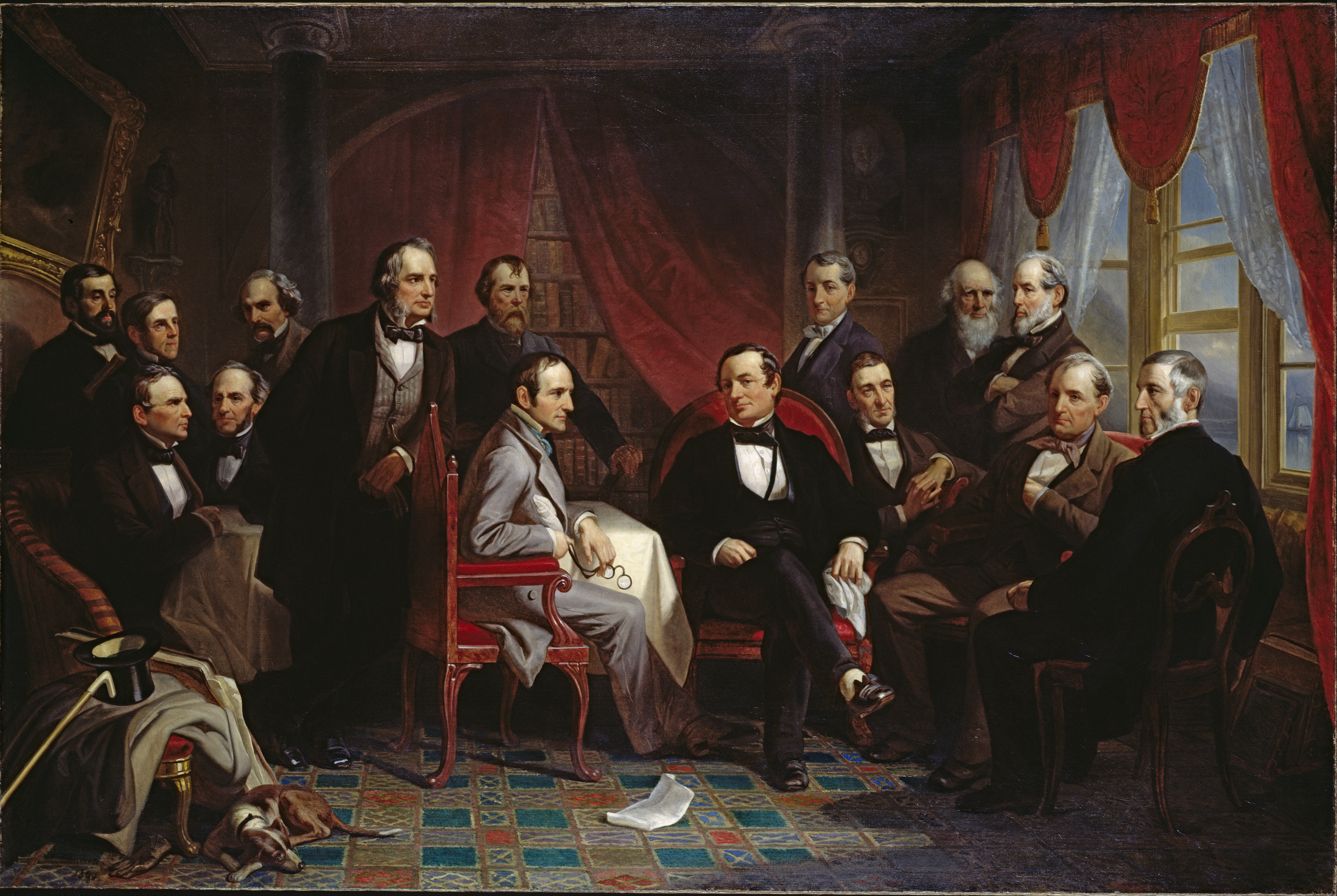
Washington Irving and his Literary Friends at Sunnyside; third from right in back is John Pendleton Kennedy.

Kennedy's friends and personal associates included George Henry Calvert, James Fenimore Cooper, Charles Dickens, Washington Irving, Edgar Allan Poe, William Gilmore Simms, and William Makepeace Thackeray. Kennedy's journal entries dated September 1858 state that Thackeray asked him for assistance with a chapter in The Virginians; Kennedy then assisted him by contributing scenic written depictions to that chapter.

While sitting round a back parlor table at the home of noted Baltimore literarist, civic leader and friend John H. B. Latrobe at 11 West Mulberry Street, across from the old Baltimore Cathedral in the Mount Vernon, Baltimore neighborhood in October 1833, imbibing some spirits and genial conversation with another friend James H. Miller, they together judged the draft of "MS. Found in a Bottle" from a then-unknown aspiring writer Edgar Allan Poe to be worthy of publishing in the Baltimore Sunday Visitor because of its dark and macabre atmosphere. Also in 1835, he helped later introduce Poe to Thomas Willis White, editor of the Southern Literary Messenger.

While abroad, Kennedy became a friend of William Makepeace Thackeray and wrote or outlined the fourth chapter of the second volume of The Virginians, a fact which accounts for the great accuracy of its scenic descriptions. Of his works, Horse-Shoe Robinson is the best and ranks high in antebellum fiction. Washington Irving read an advance copy of it and reported he was "so tickled with some parts of it" that he read it aloud to his friends. Kennedy sometimes wrote under the pen name 'Mark Littleton', especially in his political satires.

== Lawyer and politician ==
Kennedy enjoyed politics more than law (although the Union Bank was a prime client), and left the Democratic Party when he realized that under President Andrew Jackson it came to oppose internal improvements. He thus became an active Whig like his father-in-law and favored Baltimore's commercial interests. He was appointed Secretary of the Legation in Chile on January 27, 1823, but did not proceed to his post, instead resigning on June 23 of the same year. He was elected to the Maryland House of Delegates in 1820 and chaired its committee on internal improvements, championing the Chesapeake and Ohio Canal so vigorously (despite its failure to pay dividends), that he failed to win re-election after his 1823 vote for state support.

In 1838, Kennedy succeeded Isaac McKim in the U.S. House of Representatives, but was defeated in his bid for reelection in November of that year. Meanwhile, in 1835, Kennedy was among the 10 Baltimoreans who attended a railroad meeting in Brownsville, Pennsylvania, where he delivered a very well-received address urging completion of the B&O Railroad to the Ohio River valley (rather than to Pennsylvania canals, which fed Philadelphia rather than Baltimore). Kennedy was also on the 25-man committee that lobbied the Maryland legislature on the B&O's behalf and ultimately secured passage of the "Eight Million Dollar Bill" in 1836, which led to his becoming a B&O board member the following year (and remained such for many years). When the B&O chose a route westward through Virginia rather than the mountains near Hagerstown, Maryland in 1838, Kennedy was in the B&O's delegation to lobby Virginia's legislature (together with B&O President Louis McLane and well-connected Maryland delegate John Spear Nicholas, son of Judge Philip Norborne Nicholas, a leader of the Richmond Junto) that secured passage of a law authorizing a $1,058,000 (~$30.7 million in 2024) subscription (40% of the estimated cost for building the B&O through the state). However, the B&O's shareholders would reject the necessary Wheeling subscription because of its onerous terms, and Kennedy would again take up his pen in the B&O's defense against criticism by Maryland Governor William Grason.

Kennedy won re-election to Congress in 1840 and 1842; but, because of his strong opposition to the annexation of Texas, he was defeated in 1844. His influence in Congress was largely responsible for the appropriation of $30,000 to test Samuel Morse's telegraph. In 1847, Kennedy became speaker of the Maryland House of Delegates, and used his influence to help the B&O, although by the late 1840s it was caught in a three-way controversy with the states of Pennsylvania and Virginia as to whether the B&O's terminus should be Wheeling, Parkersburg or Pittsburgh. After an acrimonious shareholders meeting on August 25, 1847, the B&O affirmed Wheeling as its terminus, and finally completed track to the city in 1853.

Meanwhile, President Millard Fillmore appointed Kennedy as Secretary of the Navy in July 1852. During Kennedy's tenure in office, the Navy organized four important naval expeditions including that which sent Commodore Matthew C. Perry to Japan and Lieutenant William Lewis Herndon and Lieutenant Lardner Gibbon to explore the Amazon.

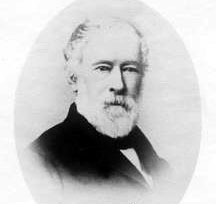
1850 photo of John Pendleton Kennedy at approximately 55 years of age.

Kennedy was proposed as a vice-presidential running mate to Abraham Lincoln when Lincoln first sought the Presidency of the United States, although Kennedy was ultimately not selected. Kennedy became a forceful supporter of the Union during the Civil War, and he supported the passage of the Emancipation Proclamation. Later, since the proclamation did not free Maryland slaves because the state was not in rebellion, he also used his influence to push for legislation in Maryland that ultimately ended slavery there in 1864.

In 1853, he was elected as a member to the American Philosophical Society.

== Position on religious tolerance ==
Kennedy called for erecting a monument to the founding of the state of Maryland and to the birth of religious freedom in its original colonial settlement in St. Mary's City, Maryland. Three local citizens then expanded on his idea and sought to start a school that would become a "Living Monument" to religious freedom. The school was founded as such a monument in 1840 by order of the state legislature. Its original name was St. Mary's Seminary, but it would later be known as St. Mary's College of Maryland.

All the world outside of these portals was intolerant, proscriptive, vengeful against the children of a dissenting faith. Here only in Maryland, throughout all this wide world of Christendom, was there an altar erected and truly dedicated to the freedom of Christian worship. Let those who first reared it enjoy the renown to which it has entitled them.

John Pendleton Kennedy, On memorializing the birth of religious freedom in St. Mary's City Maryland

Earlier, when he was in the Maryland state legislature, Kennedy was instrumental in repealing a law that discriminated against Jewish people in court and trial procedures in Maryland. Jewish people were a tiny population in the state at the time and Kennedy was not Jewish, so there was no political or personal advantage to his position. His opposition to slavery in Maryland can be traced back for decades but the depth of that opposition went through an evolution from mild and more economically based in the beginning, to being stronger and more morally based by the time of the Emancipation Proclamation. Kennedy, an Episcopalian, also helped to lead private charitable efforts to aid Irish Catholic immigrants, who were experiencing a great deal of discrimination in the state at the time. However, he did also advocate setting limits on overall foreign national immigration into Maryland beginning in the 1850s, stating that he felt that the sheer number of new immigrants might overwhelm the economy.

== Opposition to slavery ==
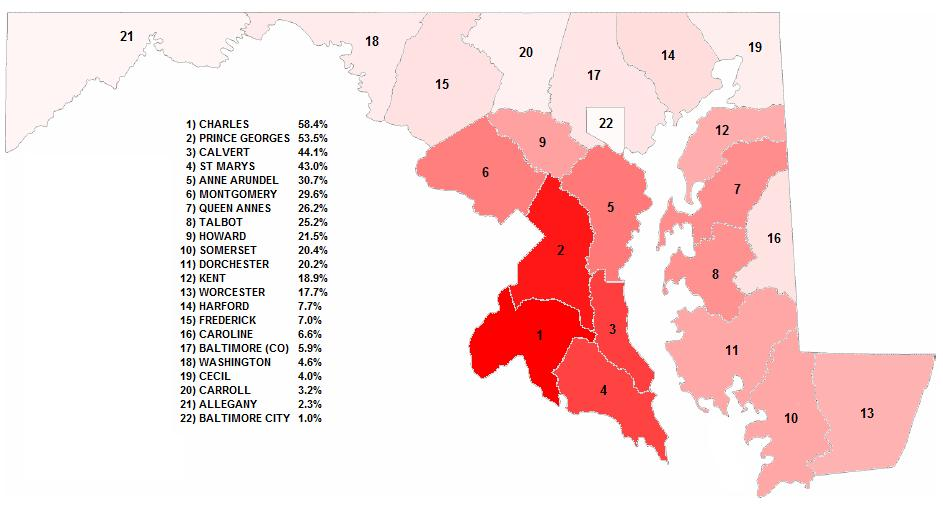
Map of slave populations in Maryland by county at the time of the Civil War

Kennedy's opposition to slavery was first publicly expressed in his writings and later in his life as a politician through his speeches and political initiatives. His opposition to slavery in Maryland can be traced back through many decades of his life, but the depth of that opposition went through an evolution from milder and more understated in the beginning, to being stronger, more vocal and more morally based by the time of the Emancipation Proclamation and then the following state-level effort to end slavery in Maryland, as the state was not included in the Emancipation Proclamation because it was not in the Confederacy.

Kennedy once wrote that witnessing a speech by Frederick Douglass had opened his eyes more fully to the "curse" of slavery, as Kennedy called it by 1863.

Kennedy's 1830s novel Swallow Barn is critical of slavery but also idealizes plantation life. However, the original manuscript shows that some of Kennedy's initial descriptions of plantation life were much more critical of slavery, but that he crossed those out of the manuscript before the book went to the printer, possibly because he was afraid of being too openly critical of slavery while living in Maryland, a slave state.

The novel, although more muted in its criticism of slavery by the time of its publication and also expressing some idyllic stereotypes about plantation life, leads to the prediction that slavery would bring the Southern states to ruin. Swallow Barn was published in 1832, 29 years before the start of the Civil War and long before anyone else was known to predict that the Southern and Northern states were headed for armed conflict.

=== Civil War ===
Just prior to the Civil War, Kennedy wrote that abolishing slavery immediately was not worth full-scale civil war and that slavery should instead be ended in stages to avoid war. He noted that civil wars were historically the most bloody and devastating kinds of warfare and suggested a negotiated, phased approach to ending slavery to prevent war between the sections.

But after the war broke out, he returned to a position of outright opposition to slavery and began to call for "immediate emancipation" of slaves. His demands for the end of slavery grew stronger as the war progressed. By the height of the Civil War, when Kennedy's opposition to slavery had become much stronger, he signed his name to a key political pamphlet in Maryland opposing slavery and calling for its immediate end.

There is consensus among historians that Kennedy was critical of slavery to some degree for decades, strongly opposed to slavery by the height of the Civil War, and strongly opposed the Confederacy. In Maryland state politics and charity leadership, Kennedy was also known to help other minority groups, notably Jews and Irish Catholics. When the Emancipation Proclamation did not end slavery in Maryland, Kennedy played a key leadership role in campaigning for the end of slavery in the state.

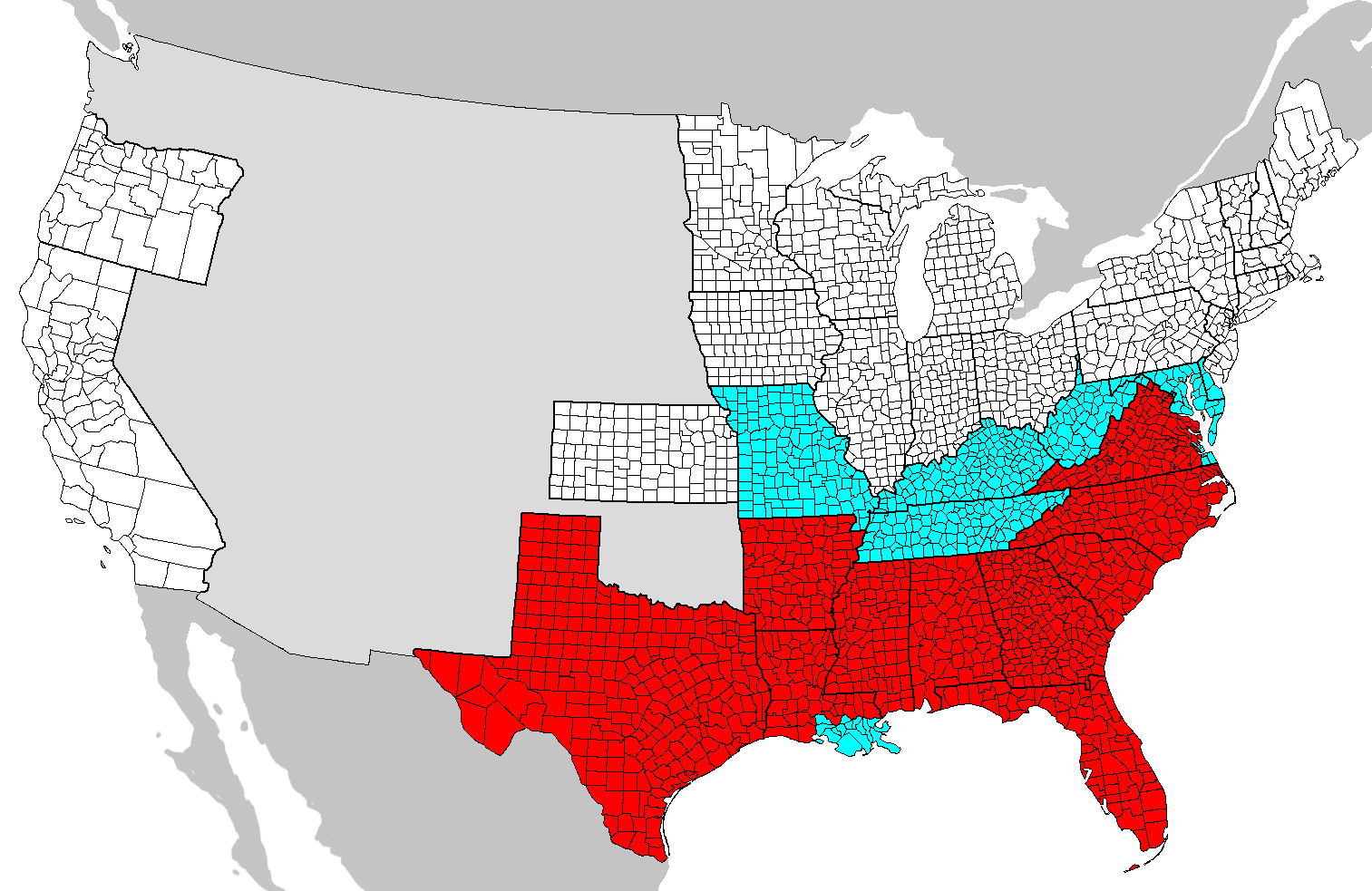
Map shows slave-holding areas affected by the Emancipation Proclamation in red, and slave-holding areas not affected by the emancipation proclamation, including Maryland, in blue. Map is based on the situation in 1863, just after the passage of the Emancipation Proclamation.

Because Maryland was not in the Confederacy, the Emancipation Proclamation did not apply to the state and slavery continued there. Since there was no active insurrection in Maryland, President Lincoln did not feel constitutionally authorized to extend the Emancipation Proclamation to Maryland. Only the state itself could end slavery at this point, and this was not a certain outcome as Maryland was a slave state with strong Confederate sympathies. John Pendleton Kennedy and other antislavery leaders, therefore, organized a political gathering. On December 16, 1863, a special meeting of the Central Committee of the Union Party of Maryland was called on the issue of slavery in the state.

At the meeting, Thomas Swann, a state politician, put forward a motion calling for the party to work for "Immediate emancipation (of all slaves) in Maryland". John Pendleton Kennedy spoke next and seconded the motion. Since Kennedy was the former speaker of the Maryland General Assembly, as well as a respected author, his support carried enormous weight in the party. A vote was taken and the motion passed. However the people of Maryland as a whole were by then divided on the issue and so twelve months of campaigning and lobbying on the matter of slavery continued throughout the state. During this effort, Kennedy signed his name to a party pamphlet calling for "immediate emancipation" of all slaves that was widely circulated. On November 1, 1864, after a year-long debate, a state referendum was put forth on the slavery question. The citizens of Maryland voted to abolish slavery, though only by a 1,000 vote margin, as the Southern part of the state remained heavily dependent on the slave economy.

== Work with cultural and educational institutions ==
Kennedy, in his close association with George Peabody, was instrumental in the establishment of the Peabody Institute, which later evolved and split into the Peabody Library and the Peabody Conservatory of Music, which are now both part of Johns Hopkins University. He also served on the first board of trustees for the institute and did the first writing that outlined its mission. He also recorded minutes for the board's earliest meetings. Kennedy is known to have worked for years to help lay the groundwork for these institutions.

Kennedy also played an essential but unintended role in the establishment of St. Mary's Female Seminary which is now known as St. Mary's College of Maryland, the state's public honors college. Kennedy's used his reputation as a respected Maryland politician and author, to call for designating St. Mary's City as the state's "Living Monument to religious freedom", memorializing its location on the site of Maryland's first colony, which was also considered to be the birthplace of religious freedom in America as well. A few years later three local citizens refined his idea into calling for a school in St. Mary's City that would be the "Living monument". The school continues to have this designation to this day.

Kennedy was the primary initial impetus and was also pivotal in gaining early state recognition of its responsibility for protecting, studying and memorializing St. Mary's City, Maryland (the then-abandoned site of Maryland's first colony and capitol, as well as being the birthplace of religious freedom in America), as a key state historic area, placing historical research and preservation mandates under the original auspices of the new state-sponsored St. Mary's Female Seminary, located on the same site. This planted the early seeds of what would eventually become Historic St. Mary's City, a state-run archeological research and historic interpretation area that exists today on the site of Maryland's original colonial settlement.

Historic St. Mary's City also co-runs (jointly with St. Mary's College of Maryland) the now internationally recognized Historical Archaeology Field School, a descendant of Kennedy's idea that a school should be involved in researching and preserving the remains of colonial St. Mary's City.

During his term as U.S. Secretary of the Navy, Kennedy made the request for the establishment of the United States Naval Academy Band in Annapolis in 1852. The band continues to be active to this day.

== Roles in science and technology ==
=== Federal study and acceptance of the telegraph ===
While serving in the United States Congress, John Pendleton Kennedy was the primary and decisive force in Congress in securing $30,000 (an enormous sum at the time) for testing Samuel Morse's telegraph communications system. This was the first electronic means of long-distance communication in human history. The government tests corroborated Morse's invention and led to federal adoption of the technology and the subsequent establishment of the American telegraph communications system, which revolutionized communications and the economic development of the United States. Federal acceptance of the telegraph had a major impact on Abraham Lincoln's management of the Civil War as well.

=== Commissioner of the 1867 Paris Exposition ===
Kennedy was a commissioner of the 1867 Paris Exposition, an international science, technology and arts fair that was held in Paris, France, in 1867. The fair had participation from 42 nations and had over 50,000 exhibits. It was the second World's Fair.

== Retirement from public office ==
Kennedy retired from elected and appointed offices in March 1853 when President Fillmore left office, but he remained very active in both Federal and state of Maryland politics, supporting Fillmore in 1856, when Fillmore won Maryland's electoral votes and Kennedy's brother Anthony won a U.S. Senate seat. His name was mentioned as one of the vice-presidential prospects on the Republican ticket alongside Abraham Lincoln in 1860. Instead, Kennedy was the Maryland chairman of the Constitutional Union Party, which nominated John Bell and Edward Everett for the Presidency. Kennedy played an instrumental leadership role in the Union Party's successful effort to end slavery in Maryland in 1864. This had to be done at the state level because the Emancipation Proclamation did not apply to the state. At the end of the American Civil War – during which he forcefully supported the Union – he advocated amnesty for former rebels.

During this time, he had a summer home overlooking the south branch of the Patapsco River upstream near Orange Grove-Avalon-Ilchester off the main western line of the Baltimore and Ohio Railroad now in the area of Patapsco Valley State Park, which was devastated by a disastrous flood in 1868.

Kennedy died in Newport, Rhode Island, on August 18, 1870, and is buried in Greenmount Cemetery in Baltimore, Maryland.

== Legacy ==
In his will, Kennedy wrote the following:

It is my wish that the manuscript volumes containing my journals, my note or common-place books, and the several volumes of my own letters in press copy, as also all my other letters, such as may possess any interest or value (which I desire to be bound in volumes) that are now in loose sheets, shall be returned to my executors, who are requested to have the same packed away in a strong walnut box, closed and locked, and then delivered to the Peabody Institute, to be preserved by them unopened until the year 1900, when the same shall become the property of the Institute, to be kept among its books and records.

Today there are two large special collections of his papers, manuscripts and correspondence; one remains at the Peabody Institute in Baltimore and the other is at the Enoch Pratt Free Library in Baltimore. There are also a number of libraries from Virginia to Boston that have smaller collections of his correspondence (both private and official letters).

The naval ships USS John P. Kennedy and USS Kennedy (DD-306) were named for him.

== Books and essays ==
- The Red Book (1818–19, two volumes).
- Swallow Barn: Or, A Sojourn in the Old Dominion (1832) [under the pen-name Mark Littleton].
- Horse-Shoe Robinson: A Tale of the Tory Ascendency in South Carolina, in 1780 (1835).
- Rob of the Bowl: A Legend of St. Inigoe's (1838) [under the pen-name Mark Littleton].
- Annals of Quodlibet [under the pen-name Solomon Secondthoughts] (1840).
- Defence of the Whigs [under the pen-name A Member of the Twenty-seventh Congress] (1844).
- Memoirs of the Life of William Wirt (1849, two volumes).
- The Great Drama: An Appeal to Maryland, Baltimore, reprinted from the Washington National Intelligencer of May 9, 1861.
- The Border States: Their Power and Duty in the Present Disordered Condition of the Country (1861).
- Autograph Leaves of Our Country's Authors [anthology, co-edited by John P. Kennedy and Alexander Bliss] (1864)
- Mr. Paul Ambrose's Letters on the Rebellion [under the pen-name Paul Ambrose] (1865).
- Collected Works of John Pendleton Kennedy (1870–72, ten volumes).
- At Home and Abroad: A Series of Essays: With a Journal in Europe in 1867–68 (1872, essays).

== See also ==
- History of slavery in Maryland
- International Exposition (1867), the second Worlds Fair, held in Paris, of which Kennedy was a commissioner

U.S. House of Representatives
Preceded by Isaac McKim	Member of the U.S. House of Representatives from Maryland's 4th congressional district 1838–1839	Succeeded by Solomon Hillen Jr.
Preceded by Solomon Hillen Jr.	Member of the U.S. House of Representatives from Maryland's 4th congressional district 1841–1845	Succeeded by William Giles
Preceded by Edward Curtis	Chair of the House Commerce Committee; 1841–1843	Succeeded by Isaac E. Holmes
Political offices
Preceded by William S. Waters	Speaker of the Maryland House of Delegates; 1846	Succeeded by William J. Blakistone
Preceded by William Graham	United States Secretary of the Navy; 1852–1853	Succeeded by James C. Dobbin
