= Lake Montebello =

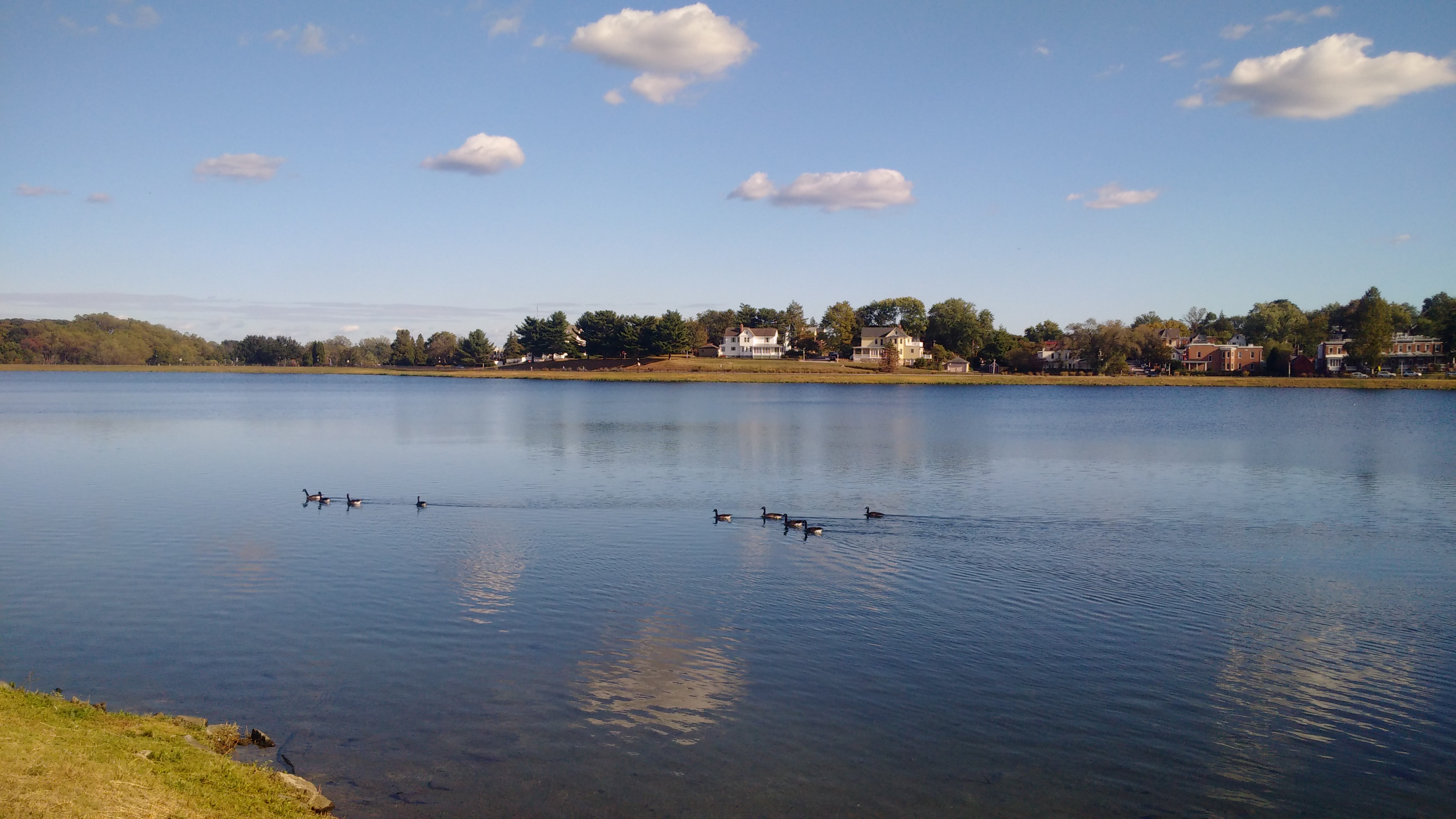

- Location within Maryland Location within the United States
- Location: Baltimore City, Maryland, United States
- Coordinates: 39°19′55″N 76°35′02″W
- Type: Reservoir
- Basin countries: United States
- Built: 1881
- Surface elevation: 161 ft (49 m)
- Settlements: Baltimore

Lake Montebello is a reservoir located near Mayfield and Coldstream-Homestead-Montebello in Northeast Baltimore City in central Maryland. The lake was excavated and constructed in 1881, and nearby Montebello Filtration Plants 1 and 2 were completed in 1915 and 1928, respectively. The lake contains approximately 410 million US gallons (1,600,000 m^{3}) of water, with a maximum storage of 606 million US gallons (2,290,000 m^{3}). Today, the lake continues to act as a settling basin for what goes on in the filtration plant. A 1.3 mile bike and walking path lines the lake and are used as a recreational area for the surrounding community.

== History ==
In 1854, the nearby Herring Run stream on the northeast corner from the old city limits at Boundary Avenue (now North Avenue) of 1818 to 1888) and flowing southeastward into Back River and then Chesapeake Bay in Baltimore County, was identified as a possible source of drinking water for the rapidly expanding pre-American Civil War City of Baltimore. The lake was excavated and constructed between 1875 and 1881, and on September 29, 1881, the lake reached its full height/depth of 163′ feet. Construction of a tunnel to the northwest connecting Loch Raven Reservoir (also then under construction) with the new Lake Montebello was also completed in 1881. Three decades later, in 1910, chlorination of the water supply was instituted, followed by construction of a water filtration plant complex at the Montebello site. Montebello Filtration Plant 1, situated on the east side of Hillen Road, which began operation in 1915 after a two-year construction period. Called one of the “biggest and most important undertakings in the history of the city” by Robert L. Clemmitt, the city’s acting water engineer and president of the water board, the filtration plant's creation was the turning point for healthy drinking water in the city and metropolitan area of central Maryland and set a nation-wide standard for progressive Baltimore.

In 1918-1919, in the Third Major City Annexation Act of surrounding territory in then rural Baltimore County on the west, north and east sides of the city and to the south from Anne Arundel County greatly enlarging the City. This additional land with growing population and its following urban development spurred the construction of subsequent Montebello Plant 2, which began operation in 1928. Other major expansion construction projects occurring during the first half of the 20th century included construction of the Montebello-Druid Lake conduit and Prettyboy Dam (1933), construction of the Gunpowder-Montebello Tunnel (1941), and construction of the Patapsco-Montebello Tunnel (1950). Since World War II, the tremendous growth of the Baltimore Metropolitan region in central Maryland now extending into outer counties of Carroll, Harford, and Howard Counties with a wider service area "beyond the Beltway" (1958-1972) of interstate highways and the suburbanization communities surrounding the central city put an additional strain and pressure on the public water supply and sewage treatment systems now met by several public works departments led by the city and additional counties for a region-wide master plan of services.

== Today ==
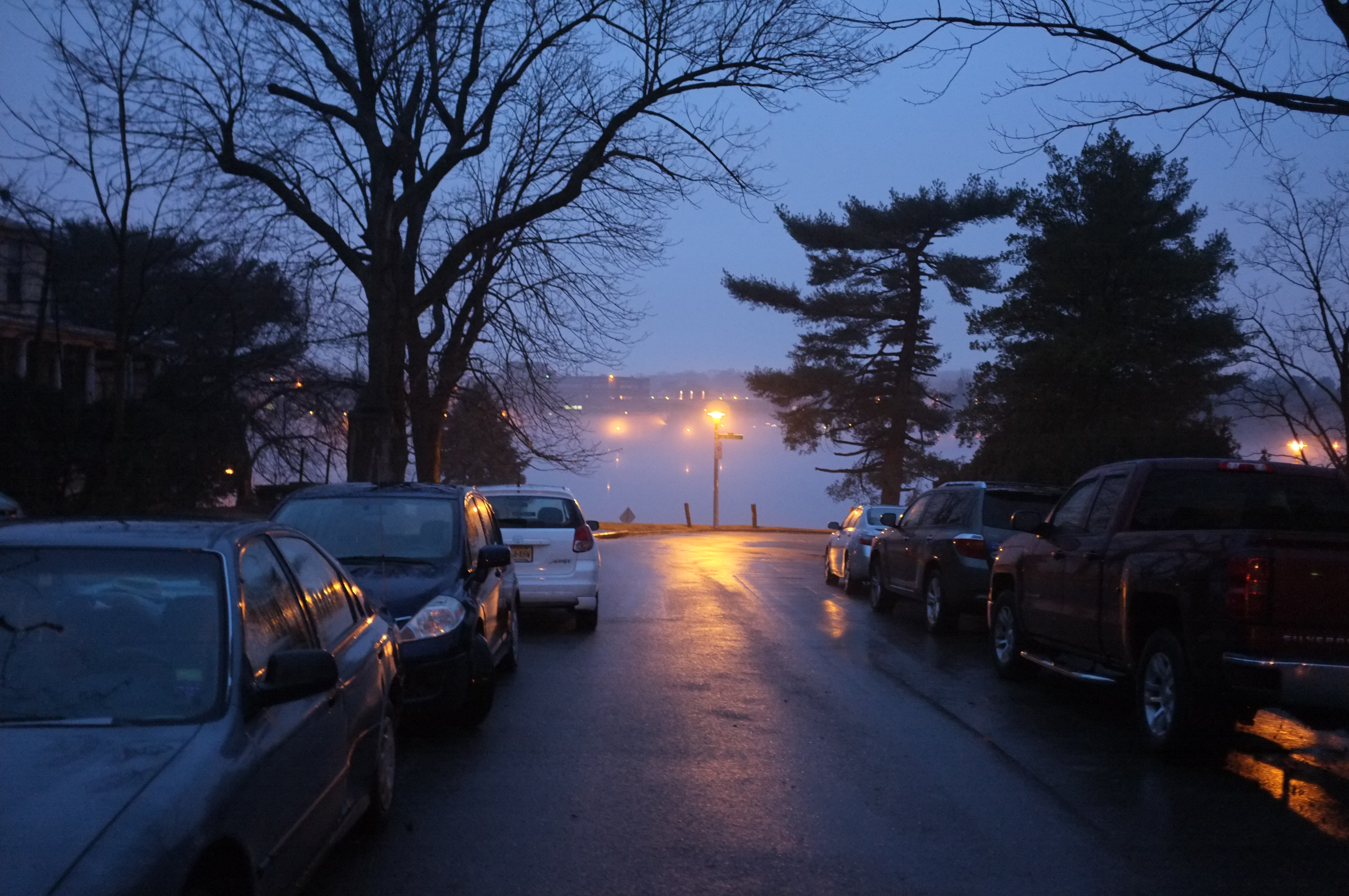
Lake Montebello, seen from Erdman Avenue in Mayfield

The original indoor filter tanks housed in the 1915 era red brick buildings of Italian Renaissance style architecture with tile roofs remain in use today. Kurt Kocher, a public works spokesman, said the two Lake Montebello filtration plants likely will remain in use into the 2020s, when officials hope to bring a new plant on line in Fullerton, a suburb, northeast of the city in Baltimore County. When that facility opens, public works department city officials could either retire or refurbish the older Montebello plant. Efforts by Mayfield Improvement Association, Coldstream-Homestead-Montebello neighborhoods, Ednor Gardens-Lakeside, Northwood and other nearby community associations continue to support the natural beauty surrounding the lake and medians around pedestrian paths along the perimeter of the lake.

== See also ==
- Montibello
