= Horse-Shoe Robinson =

1835 novel by John P. Kennedy

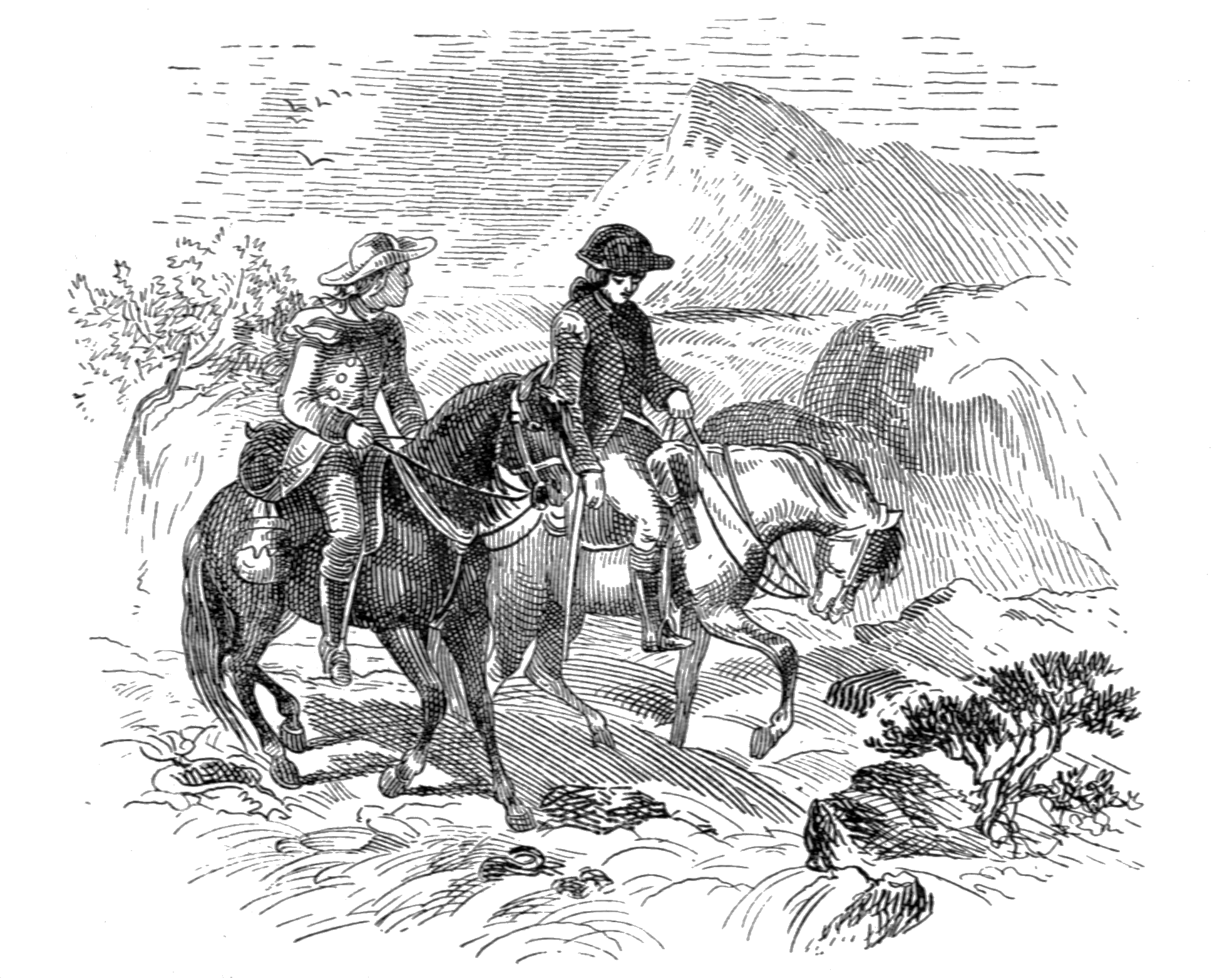
- Major Butler and Horseshoe Robinson
- Author: John P. Kennedy
- Language: English
- Publisher: Philadelphia: Carey, Lea & Blanchard / New York: Wiley and Long
- Publication date: 1835
- Publication place: United States
- Pages: 2 vol. (1835 U.S.); 3 vol. (1835 U.K.)

Horse-Shoe Robinson: A Tale of the Tory Ascendency is an 1835 novel by John P. Kennedy that was a popular seller in its day.

The novel was Kennedy's second, and proved to be his most popular. It is a work of historical romance of the American Revolution, set in the western mountain areas of the Carolinas and Virginia, culminating at the Battle of Kings Mountain.

The primary characters of the novel include Francis Marion, Banastre Tarleton, General Charles Cornwallis, Horseshoe Robinson (so named because he was originally a blacksmith), Mary Musgrove and her lover John Ramsay, Henry and Mildred Lyndsay (patriots), Mildred's lover Arthur Butler (whom she secretly marries), and Habershaw with his gang of rogues and Indians.

== Play ==
The novel was adapted for the stage a number of times, but the best known were by Charles Dance in 1836, which starred actor James Henry Hackett, and a version created in 1856 by Clifton W. Tayleure titled Horseshoe Robinson, or the Battle of King's Mountain, which included William Ellis as Robinson and George C. Boniface as Major Arthur Butler.
