= James O. Law =

American politician and merchant (1809–1847)

James Owen Law

13th Mayor of Baltimore
- In office 1843–1844
- Preceded by: Solomon Hillen
- Succeeded by: Jacob G. Davies

Personal details
- Born: March 14, 1809 Baltimore, Maryland, U.S.
- Died: June 6, 1847 (aged 38) Baltimore, Maryland, U.S.
- Resting place: Green Mount Cemetery; Baltimore, Maryland, U.S.
- Party: Whig
- Spouse: Louisa Douglass (m. 1836)
- Relations: Jacob G. Davies (cousin)
- Children: 4
- Occupation: Politician; merchant

Military service
- Branch/service: Maryland Volunteers Infantry
- Rank: Major
- Unit: Fifty-third Regiment

James Owen Law (March 14, 1809 – June 6, 1847) was an American politician and merchant. He served as Mayor of Baltimore from 1843 to 1844.

== Early life ==
James Owen Law was born on March 14, 1809, in Baltimore, Maryland to Elizabeth (née Davies) (1774–1838) and James Law (1768–1830). His parents were Presbyterian Irish immigrants. His father was from Bally Shannon in County Donegal. He received a classical education and worked at a counting house owned by his cousin Jacob G. Davies.

== Career ==
Law entered business on his own and became a Baltimore merchant. He was a member of the Independent Greys. In 1837, he was elected captain of the company. In 1842, Law was elected a major in the Fifty-third Regiment of the Maryland Volunteers Infantry. He held this role until his death. Law became president of the Independent Fire Company in 1845.

After Solomon Hillen resigned as Mayor of Baltimore in fall of 1843, Law, the Whig candidate, was elected in a special election to replace him. He defeated Democratic candidate William H. Marriott by 332 votes. His term was short-lived, as he was defeated in the following election in October 1844, by his cousin, Jacob G. Davies, a Democrat, by a margin of 498 votes. His last day in office was November 4, 1844.

After being mayor, Law was appointed the state flour inspector. He held this role until his death.

== Personal life ==
Law married Louisa Douglass of Alexandria, Virginia on January 21, 1836. They had four children.

Law died of typhus (or ship fever) on June 6, 1847, after ministering to sick Irish children in Canton, Maryland. He died at his home on West Lombard Street in Baltimore. Law was buried at Green Mount Cemetery in Baltimore.

== Legacy ==
George Washington Musgrave, a Presbyterian clergyman of Baltimore and Philadelphia, published the sermon used at Law's funeral. The sermon entitled Sermon on the death of Maj. James Owen Law was published in 1847.

Political offices
Preceded by Solomon Hillen	Mayor of Baltimore; 1843–1844	Succeeded by Jacob G. Davies
