= Jacob G. Davies =

American politician (1796–1857)

14th Mayor of Baltimore
- In office November 4, 1844 – November 18, 1848
- Preceded by: James O. Law
- Succeeded by: Elijah Stansbury Jr.

Personal details
- Born: May 29, 1796 Baltimore, Maryland, U.S.
- Died: December 7, 1857 (aged 61) Baltimore, Maryland, U.S.
- Resting place: St. Paul's Cemetery; Baltimore, Maryland, U.S.
- Party: Democratic

Military service
- Branch/service: United States Army; Maryland Militia
- Battles/wars: War of 1812; Battle of Bladensburg

Jacob G. Davies (May 29, 1796 – December 7, 1857) was an American politician. He served as Mayor of Baltimore for two terms, from 1844 to 1848.

== Early life ==
Jacob G. Davies was born on May 29, 1796, in Baltimore, Maryland, to Sarah (née Glen) and John Davies. He had a sister, Elizabeth Glen Davies. After the death of his father in 1798, his mother Sarah married Chancellor Theodorick Bland, Consul to Brazil. They had two children, William G. Bland and Sarah Bland who married Isaac Mayo.

== Career ==
Davies volunteered during the War of 1812 and participated in the Battle of Bladensburg. Afterward, he received a commission as a lieutenant in the cavalry of the United States Army. He entered the mercantile business. He joined the militia and became a brigade major. He was then promoted to colonel in the Second Regiment of cavalry in the militia. He retired, but returned to duty after a mob threat in 1835. He was placed in command of the City Guards cavalry and became the colonel of the Fifty-third Regiment of volunteer militia. He held that role until 1851. He was also president of an insurance company.

Davies was a Democrat. He ran against his cousin James O. Law for Mayor of Baltimore. He defeated his cousin by a margin of 498 votes and served as Mayor of Baltimore from November 4, 1844, to November 18, 1848, serving two terms. During his administration, the city was divided into twenty different wards. There were numerous public works projects completed in Baltimore, supporting the coal trade of the time, including the Locust Point extension of the Baltimore and Ohio Railroad (despite an initial veto by Davies in 1845), iron bridges over Harford Run and Jones Falls, and the site of Franklin Square was purchased and developed. Davies was appointed postmaster of Baltimore by President Franklin Pierce. He served as postmaster until April 1, 1857.

== Personal life ==
Davies married Mary Betts on September 18, 1821 in Baltimore, Maryland. They had four children including Solomon, Florence, Sally and Emilie.

Davies died on December 7, 1857, in his home near Baltimore. He was buried in the family vault at St. Paul's Cemetery in Baltimore.

Political offices
Preceded by James O. Law	Mayor of Baltimore; 1844–1848	Succeeded by Elijah Stansbury Jr.
