= Sheppard C. Leakin =

American politician (1790–1867)

Sheppard Church Leakin
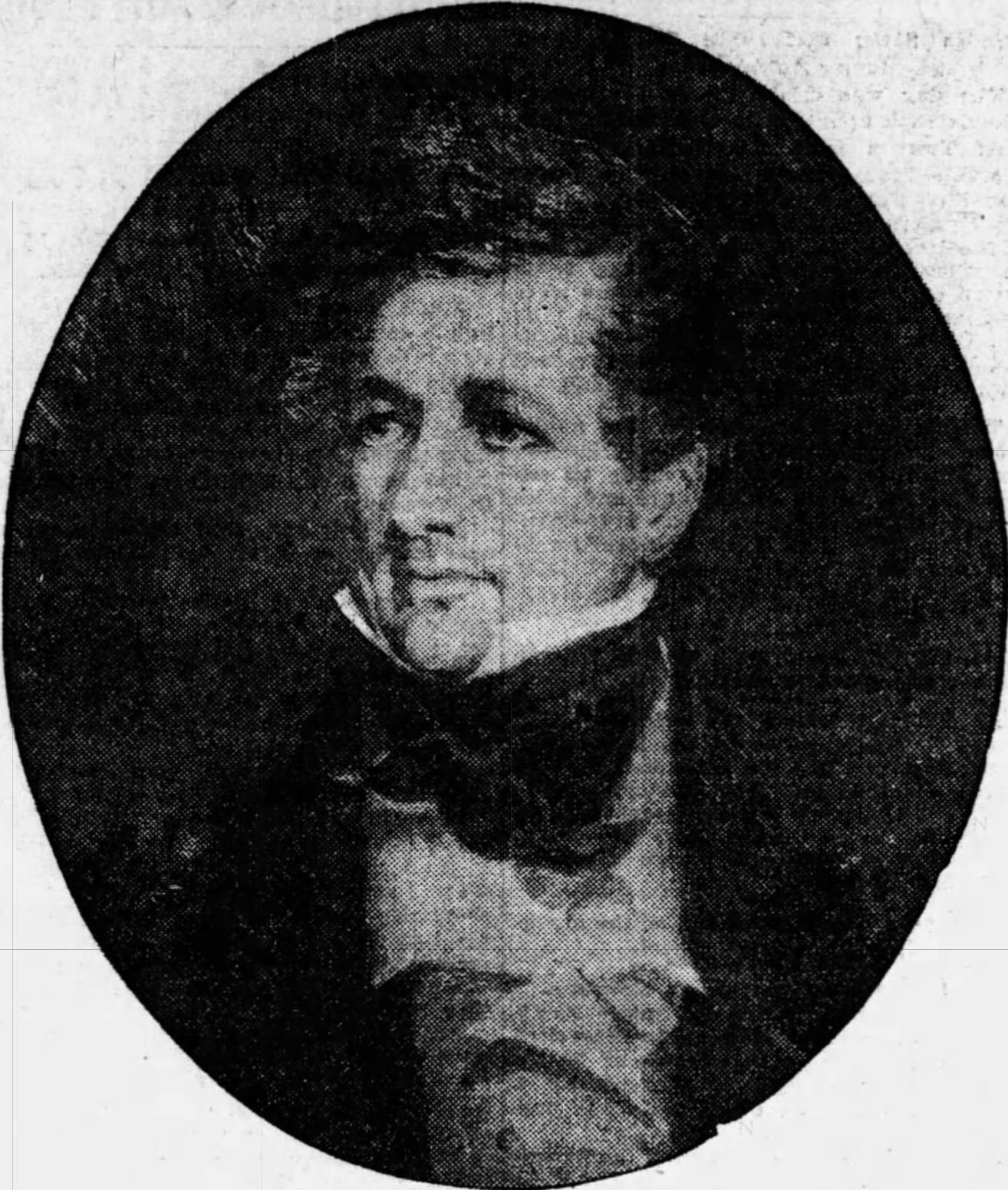
- Portrait of Leakin

10th Mayor of Baltimore
- In office November 5, 1838 – November 2, 1840
- Preceded by: Samuel Smith
- Succeeded by: Samuel Brady

Personal details
- Born: 1790 Govanstown, Maryland, U.S.
- Died: November 20, 1867 (aged 76–77) Baltimore County, Maryland, U.S.
- Party: Republican; Whig
- Spouse: Margaret Dobbin
- Children: 2
- Occupation: Politician; printer

Military service
- Unit: 38th Infantry Regiment
- Battles/wars: War of 1812; Battle of North Point; Battle of Fort McHenry

Sheppard Church Leakin (1790 – November 20, 1867) was Mayor of Baltimore from November 5, 1838, to November 2, 1840.

== Early life ==
Sheppard Church Leakin was born in 1790, in Govanstown, Maryland (now Baltimore). His ancestors emigrated from Northumberland, England in 1684 and acquired an estate on the Patapsco River.

== Career ==
Leakin enlisted in the 38th Infantry Regiment. He was part of the defense of Baltimore at the Battle of North Point and Fort McHenry in the War of 1812. He worked as a printer and was the proprietor of a bookstore in Fell's Point. He was a publisher for the Baltimore Chronicle, working with Samuel Barnes. He also became president of the Canton Company.

Leakin ran for sheriff of Baltimore County as a Republican. He served as sheriff from 1821 to 1824. Leakin ran for governor as a Whig. He became the Mayor of Baltimore on November 5, 1838, and served until November 2, 1840, after losing the mayoral election to Samuel Brady. During his administration, the Susquehanna and Tidewater Canal opened and the Baltimore and Susquehanna Railroad was completed from Baltimore to York, Pennsylvania.

Leakin became major general of the First Light Division of the Maryland Militia in 1862.

== Personal life ==
Leakin married Margaret Dobbin. They had two children, George A. and Sheppard A. His son, George Armistead Leakin, was a reverend in Baltimore County.

Leakin died on November 20, 1867, at his home in Spring Hill in Baltimore County.

== Legacy ==
Leakin Street in Baltimore, located on land previously owned by the Canton Company, was named after Leakin by the Canton Company. Leakin Park was named after Leakin's grandson and is situated close to where Leakin lived.

Preceded by Samuel Smith	Mayor of Baltimore; 1838–1840	Succeeded by Samuel Brady
