= Solomon Hillen Jr. =

American politician (1810–1873)

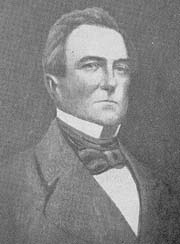

12th Mayor of Baltimore
- In office 1842–1845
- Preceded by: Samuel Brady
- Succeeded by: James O. Law

Member of the U.S. House of Representatives
- In office March 4, 1839 – March 3, 1841

Member of the Maryland House of Delegates
- In office 1834–1838

Personal details
- Born: July 10, 1810 Baltimore, Maryland, U.S.
- Died: June 26, 1873 (aged 62) New York City, New York, U.S.
- Resting place: Green Mount Cemetery; Baltimore, Maryland, U.S.
- Party: Democratic
- Spouse: Emily O'Donnell
- Children: 2
- Education: Georgetown College

Military service
- Allegiance: United States
- Branch/service: Maryland Army National Guard
- Rank: Colonel
- Unit: Fifth Regiment

Solomon Hillen Jr. (July 10, 1810 – June 26, 1873) was a U.S. representative from Maryland and mayor of Baltimore.

== Early life ==
Solomon Hillen Jr. was born on July 10, 1810, at the family estate, "Hillendale," on Hillen Road north of Baltimore to Robina Kennedy (née McHaffle) and Thomas Hillen. He graduated from Georgetown College in 1827, studied law, was admitted to the bar, and commenced practice in Baltimore.

== Career ==
Hillen served as member of the Maryland House of Delegates from 1834 to 1838. Hillen was elected as a Democrat to the Twenty-sixth Congress (March 4, 1839 – March 3, 1841). Afterward, he resumed the practice of law. He was elected on April 1, 1842 as Mayor of Baltimore, replacing Samuel Brady who had resigned. He was elected for a second term, but resigned in the fall of 1845, due to ill health. During his term, the Baltimore and Ohio Railroad was completed to Cumberland. He stopped practicing law due to ill health. He served in the company of the Independent Blues, and became colonel of the Fifth Regiment.

== Personal life ==
Hillen married Emily O'Donnell, a daughter of General Columbus O'Donnell. Hillen had two children, Thomas Hillen (1849–1887) and Emily.

Hillen lived at "Palmyra", a house on Hillen Road opposite Woodbourne Avenue in Baltimore.

Hillen died on June 26, 1873, at Fifth Avenue Hotel in New York City. He is interred in Green Mount Cemetery in Baltimore.

== Legacy ==
Hillen Street and Hillen Road in Baltimore were named after members of the Hillen family. Uses of "Hillendale" refer to the family's country estate.

U.S. House of Representatives
Preceded by Benjamin C. Howard and John Pendleton Kennedy	Member of the U.S. House of Representatives from Maryland's 4th congressional district 1839–1841	Succeeded by John Pendleton Kennedy and Alexander Randall
Political offices
Preceded by Samuel Brady	Mayor of Baltimore; 1842–1845	Succeeded by James O. Law
