= Susquehanna Conduit =

Location
- Country: United States
- State: Maryland
- Start: Deer Creek Pumping Station
- To: Montibello Pumping Station
- Runs alongside: I-95

General information
- Type: water
- Construction started: 1960

Technical information
- Length: 38 mi (61 km)
- Maximum discharge: 500 mgd
- Diameter: 108 in (2,743 mm)

The Susquehanna Conduit or Big Inch project is a 108" water supply line built in the early 1960s, connecting the Deer Creek Pumping Station in Harford County, Maryland to Baltimore City. This pipeline runs about 38 miles, parallel to Interstate 95, from the Susquehanna River to the Montibello Pumping Station in Baltimore City. The pipeline was completed in 1966.

== Usage ==
Shortly after the pipeline's completed in 1966, the Susquehanna Conduit was used to supplement Baltimore City's water supply. Use of the pipeline began on March 18, 1966 until May 25, 1966 when water levels at the Loch Raven reservoir were considered sufficient. Pumpage resumed on June 10, 1966 and a second pump was activated on June 22, 1966. Use would pause on November 16, 1966 as customers complained about water quality, resuming on December 20, 1966.

Amid drought conditions in Summer 2026, Baltimore City announced it would supplement the city's water supply with river water from the Susquehanna River. River water would be added to the city's reservoirs, including Liberty, Loch Raven, and Prettyboy. River water would be transported from the Susquehanna River to the Baltimore City water supply via the Susquehanna Conduit, marking the first time Baltimore City would supplement its water supply in this way in over twenty years. The Baltimore City Department of Public Works "tested a system in July [2026] to blend water from the Susquehanna River with water from the city's reservoirs." Baltimore City began distributing the blended water supply in early fall 2026.
