= Baltimore College =

Defunct college in Maryland, US

Baltimore College was a secular college in the city of Baltimore, Maryland, United States, founded in 1804. It was a private non-sectarian institution, although the president of its board of directors when it was formed also happened to be the Catholic bishop of Baltimore, John Carroll (served 1790–1815), first ordained Roman Catholic bishop and archbishop in America in 1790.

It was located in a structure on West Mulberry Street, near Cathedral Street, (rear of Old St. Paul's Rectory, for the nearby Episcopal church, facing south towards West Saratoga Street and Liberty Street) just south of and across the street from the new Baltimore Cathedral for the Roman Catholic Church and Archdiocese of Baltimore, under construction 1806 to 1821 (now the Basilica of the National Shrine of the Assumption of the Blessed Virgin Mary)

The institution struggled to operate for several years. In the early 1820s, L.H. Gerardin, a native of France, was the principal of the institution. It merged with the University of Maryland, founded 1807 with a School of Medicine, becoming the (undergraduate) college of arts and letters of the University of Maryland for several decades until the 1830s.
