= Samuel Smith (Maryland politician) =

American politician (1752–1839)

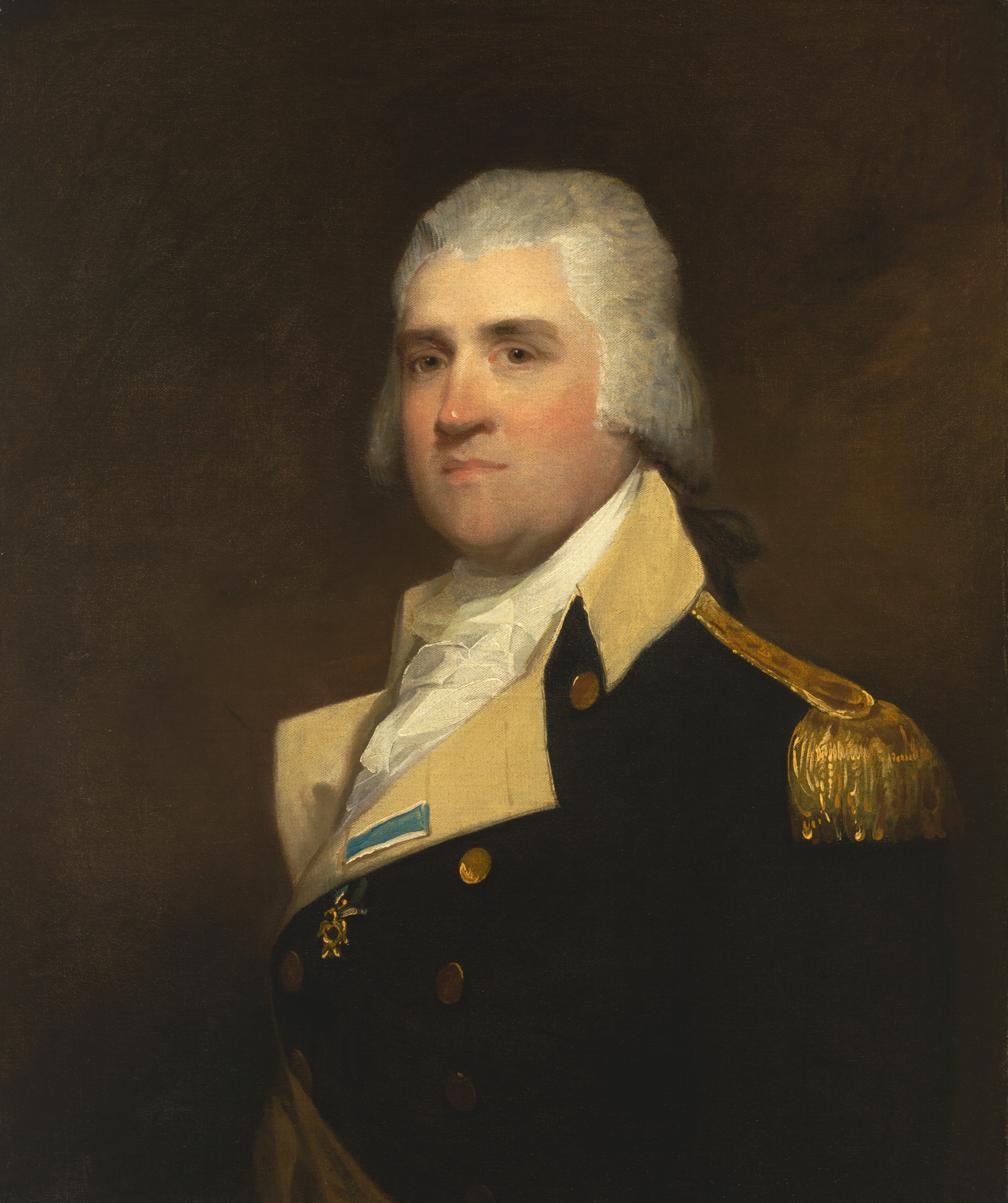
- Portrait by Gilbert Stuart, c. 1800

9th Mayor of Baltimore
- In office 1835–1838
- Preceded by: Jesse Hunt
- Succeeded by: Sheppard C. Leakin

President pro tempore of the United States Senate
- In office May 15, 1828 – December 11, 1831
- Preceded by: Nathaniel Macon
- Succeeded by: Littleton W. Tazewell
- In office December 2, 1805 – November 6, 1808
- Preceded by: Joseph Anderson
- Succeeded by: Stephen R. Bradley

United States Senator from Maryland
- In office December 17, 1822 – March 3, 1833
- Preceded by: William Pinkney
- Succeeded by: Joseph Kent
- In office March 4, 1803 – March 3, 1815
- Preceded by: John E. Howard
- Succeeded by: Robert G. Harper

Member of the U.S. House of Representatives from Maryland's 5th district
- In office January 31, 1816 – December 17, 1822
- Preceded by: Nicholas Ruxton Moore
- Succeeded by: Isaac McKim
- In office March 4, 1793 – March 3, 1803
- Preceded by: William Vans Murray
- Succeeded by: Nicholas Ruxton Moore

Member of the Maryland House of Delegates
- In office 1790–1792

Personal details
- Born: July 27, 1752 Carlisle, Province of Pennsylvania, British America
- Died: April 22, 1839 (aged 86) Baltimore, Maryland, U.S.
- Party: Democratic-Republican, Jacksonian
- Spouse: Margaret Smith (née Spear)
- Profession: Politician; merchant

Military service
- Allegiance: United States
- Branch/service: Continental Army; Maryland Militia
- Rank: Major General
- Battles/wars: American Revolutionary War; Whiskey Rebellion; War of 1812

Samuel Smith (July 27, 1752 – April 22, 1839) was an American Senator and Representative from Maryland, a mayor of Baltimore, Maryland, and a general in the Maryland militia. He was the older brother of cabinet secretary Robert Smith.

Smith served twice as President pro tempore of the United States Senate, first from 1805 to 1808 and later from 1828 to 1831.

== Early life and education ==
Smith was born in Carlisle in the Province of Pennsylvania, and moved with his family to Baltimore in 1759. He attended a private academy, and engaged in mercantile pursuits until the American Revolutionary War, at which time he served as captain, major, and lieutenant colonel in the Continental Army.

== Career ==
=== Military service ===
Before the American Revolutionary War, he was sent to Annapolis as a young captain to arrest Governor Eden and seize his papers.

=== American Revolutionary War ===
On September 23, 1777, with the Revolutionary capital of Philadelphia on the verge of capture by the British, Washington sent Smith, then a Lieutenant Colonel of the 4th Maryland Regiment, with a Continental Army detachment into the fort on Mud Island on the Delaware River. Smith's force numbered 200 soldiers plus Major Robert Ballard of Virginia, Major Simeon Thayer of Rhode Island, and Captain Samuel Treat of the Continental Artillery. However, another account stated that Thayer did not reach Fort Mifflin until October 19. With the British army closing in on Philadelphia, the small force had to reach Fort Mifflin by a circuitous route. On the last leg of their journey, reinforcements for Mud Island had to be ferried across the Delaware from Red Bank, New Jersey under the protection of the Pennsylvania Navy river flotilla commanded by John Hazelwood. The fort was eventually overwhelmed by weeks of British bombardment and was abandoned. After his service in the war, Smith engaged in the shipping business.

Colonel Smith was admitted as an original member of The Society of the Cincinnati of Maryland when it was established in 1783. He went on to serve as the vice president (1804–1828) and president of the Maryland Society (1828–1839), serving in the latter capacity until his death.

=== War of 1812 ===
Smith served as a major general of Maryland militia during the War of 1812, and commanded the defenses of Baltimore during the Battle of Baltimore in September 1814. The American victory there is partly attributed to Smith's preparation for the British invasion.

=== Political career ===
From 1790 to 1792, Smith was a member of the Maryland House of Delegates. At the time of the threatened war with France in 1794, he was appointed brigadier general of the Maryland militia and commanded Maryland's quota during the Whiskey Rebellion.

Smith entered into national politics when he was elected to the Third United States Congress, serving from March 4, 1793, until March 3, 1803. As a Congressman, Smith served as chairman of the U.S. House Committee on Commerce and Manufactures (Fifth through Seventh Congresses). As a principal negotiator between the young Federalist leader and Delaware representative, James A. Bayard Sr., and the presumptive President-Elect Jefferson, Smith secured the winning ballot in the United States House of Representatives for Jefferson during the 1800 United States presidential election. Smith entered into the Senate election in 1802, and was elected as a Democratic-Republican to the United States Senate. He was re-elected in 1808 and served from March 4, 1803 until March 3, 1815. While senator, Smith served as President pro tempore of the Senate during the Ninth and Tenth Congresses.

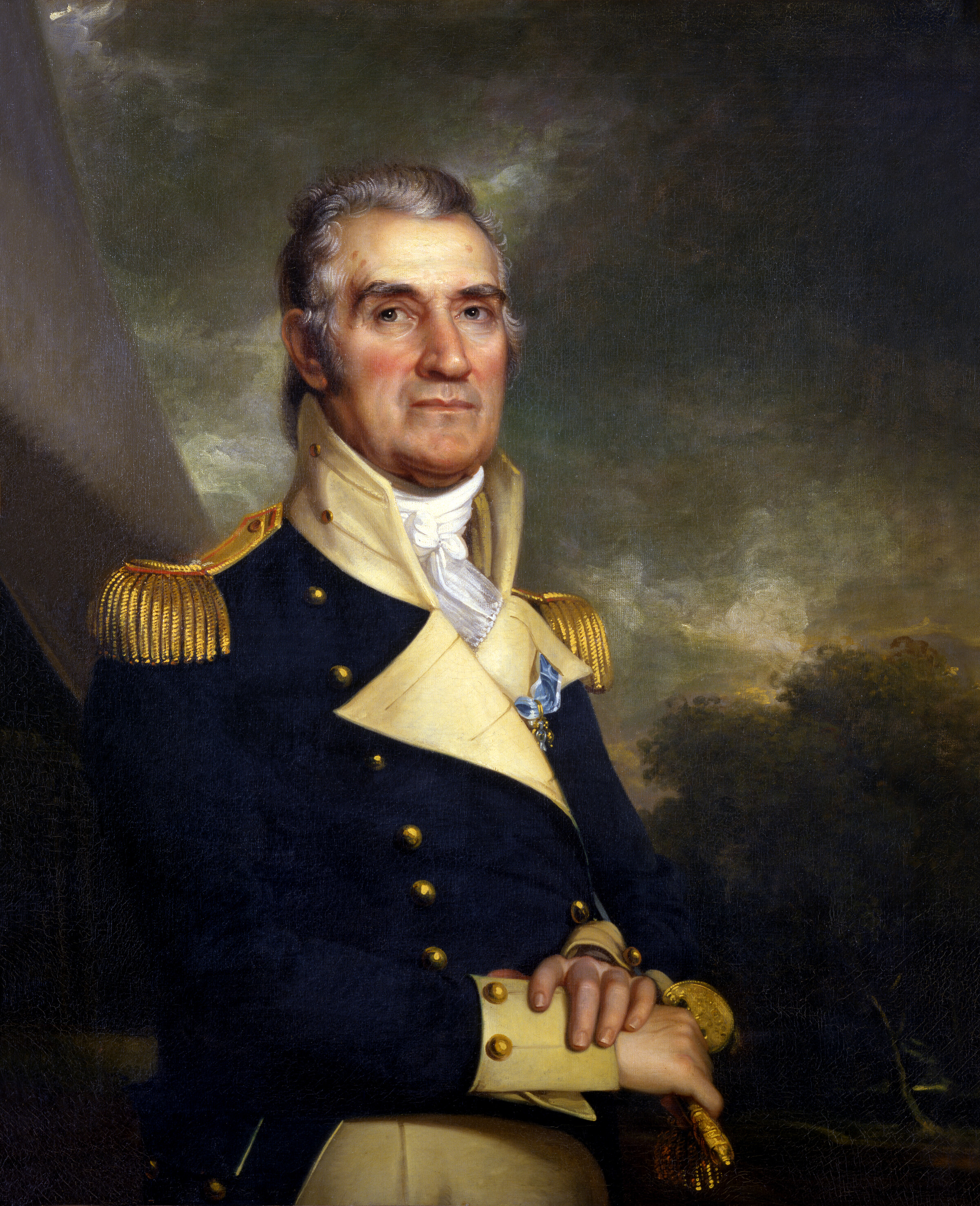
Portrait by Rembrandt Peale, c. 1817

Smith was elected to the Fourteenth Congress on January 31, 1816 to fill the vacancy caused by the resignation of Nicholas R. Moore, and was re-elected to the Fifteenth, Sixteenth, and Seventeenth Congresses. In the House, Smith served as chairman of the U.S. House Committee on Expenditures in the Department of the Treasury (Fourteenth Congress), and as a member of the Committee on Ways and Means (Fifteenth through Seventeenth Congresses).

On December 17, 1822, Smith resigned as congressman, having been elected as a Democratic-Republican (later Crawford Republican and Jacksonian) to the United States Senate to fill the vacancy caused by the death of William Pinkney. In March–April 1824, Samuel Smith was honored with a single vote at the Democratic-Republican Party Caucus to be the party's candidate for U.S. Vice President at the election later that year.

In 1828, Smith served as vice president of the Maryland State Colonization Society, of which Charles Carroll of Carrollton, one of the co-signers of the Declaration of Independence, was president. The MSCS was a branch of the American Colonization Society, an organization dedicated to returning black Americans to lead free lives in African states such as Liberia.

Smith served as President pro tempore of the Senate again during the Twentieth and Twenty-first Congresses, and as chairman of the Committee on Finance (Eighteenth and Twentieth through Twenty-second Congresses). He was re-elected in 1826 and served until March 4, 1833. Two years later, in 1835, Smith became mayor of Baltimore, and served in that position until 1838, when he retired from public life.

== Death and legacy ==
Smith died on April 22, 1839, at his residence, Montibello, near Baltimore, Maryland, aged 86 years, and was interred in the Old Westminster Burying Ground in Baltimore.

Smith appears in John Trumbull's 1824 painting General George Washington Resigning His Commission, which was featured on the reverse of the United States five-thousand-dollar bill.

U.S. House of Representatives
| Preceded by William V. Murray | Member of the U.S. House of Representatives from Maryland's 5th congressional district March 4, 1793 – March 4, 1803 | Succeeded by Nicholas R. Moore |
U.S. Senate
| Preceded by John E. Howard | U.S. senator (Class 1) from Maryland; March 4, 1803 – March 4, 1815; Served alongside: Robert Wright, Philip Reed and Robert H. Goldsborough | Succeeded by Robert G. Harper |
| Preceded by Joseph Anderson | President pro tempore of the United States Senate; December 2, 1805 – November 6, 1808 | Succeeded by Stephen R. Bradley |
U.S. House of Representatives
| Preceded by Nicholas Ruxton Moore | Member of the U.S. House of Representatives from Maryland's 5th congressional district January 31, 1816 – December 17, 1822; Served alongside: William Pinkney and Peter Little | Succeeded by Isaac McKim |
U.S. Senate
| Preceded by William Pinkney | U.S. senator (Class 1) from Maryland; December 17, 1822 – March 4, 1833; Served alongside: Edward Lloyd and Ezekiel F. Chambers | Succeeded by Joseph Kent |
| Preceded by Walter Lowrie | Chairman of the U.S. Senate Finance Committee; 1823 – 1832 | Succeeded by John Forsyth |
| Preceded by Nathaniel Macon | President pro tempore of the United States Senate; May 15, 1828 – December 11, 1831 | Succeeded by Littleton W. Tazewell |
Political offices
| Preceded by Jesse Hunt | Mayor of Baltimore, Maryland; 1835 – 1838 | Succeeded by Sheppard C. Leakin |
Honorary titles
| Preceded by Paine Wingate | Oldest living U.S. senator March 7, 1838 – April 22, 1839 | Succeeded by Nathaniel Chipman |
