= National Register of Historic Places listings in Central Baltimore =

This is a list of National Register of Historic Places properties and districts in downtown Baltimore, Maryland, United States. Many other properties are located in other parts of the city; for these, see National Register of Historic Places listings in Baltimore, Maryland.

The locations of the National Register properties and districts listed below (at least for all showing latitude and longitude coordinates below) may be seen in a map by clicking on "Map of all coordinates".

Much of the central portion of the city and significant portions of the waterfront and city park system are included in the federally designated Baltimore National Heritage Area.

This National Park Service list is complete through NPS recent listings posted June 6, 2026.

== Current listings ==
	Name on the Register	Image	Date listed	Location	District	Description
1	David Bachrach House	David Bachrach House	September 5, 1985 (#85001947)	2406-2408 Linden Ave. 39°18′51″N 76°38′10″W	Central	
2	Baltimore City College	Baltimore City College	August 11, 1983 (#83002925)	530 North Howard Street; 39°17′46″N 76°37′13″W	Central	Served the third oldest public high school in America - founded 1839, which occupied several structures through its history. Here constructed 1893-1895 in Richardson Romanesque Revival style, facing north towards West Centre Street, designed by local prominent architectural firm of Baldwin & Pennington, (Ephraim Francis Baldwin, [1846-1916], and Josias Pennington, [1854-1929]), to replace earlier English Tudor Revival style building (which faced east towards North Howard Street) by George A. Frederick, [1842-1924], (also designer at same time of massive Baltimore City Hall, 1867-1875, his "flagship project") in 1874-1875 on same site, which was later undermined and collapsed from construction by the Baltimore and Ohio Railroad's Howard Street Tunnel in 1891-1892. Occupied by B.C.C. until 1928, when the school moved to its present hill-top campus with stone Collegiate Gothic Revival "Castle on the Hill" at 33rd Street and The Alameda in northeast Baltimore. Its 1895 home was located next to the first downtown campus of The Johns Hopkins University along North Howard Street, between West Centre, Little Ross and West Monument Streets, from 1876 to c. 1914, until moving to Homewood. City College served as an unofficial "prep school" for J.H.U. during the late 19th and early 20th Centuries.
3	Baltimore City Hall	Baltimore City Hall	May 8, 1973 (#73002180)	100 North Holliday Street; 39°17′27″N 76°36′39″W	Central	
4	Baltimore City Municipal Office Building	Baltimore City Municipal Office Building	July 3, 2025 (#100011983)	200 N Holliday Street; 39°17′31″N 76°36′37″W	Central	
5	Baltimore City Passenger Railway Power House and Car Barn	Baltimore City Passenger Railway Power House and Car Barn	September 9, 1998 (#98001156)	1711-1717 N. Charles St. 39°18′33″N 76°36′59″W	Central	
6	Baltimore College of Dental Surgery	Baltimore College of Dental Surgery	May 8, 1987 (#87000697)	429-433 N. Eutaw St. 39°17′41″N 76°37′16″W	Central	The building is now used for retail businesses
7	Baltimore Equitable Society	Baltimore Equitable Society	October 6, 1977 (#77001528)	21 N. Eutaw St. 39°17′28″N 76°37′16″W	Central	
8	Baltimore Federal Savings & Loan Association	Baltimore Federal Savings & Loan Association	November 22, 2022 (#100008034)	19-25 East Fayette St. 39°17′25″N 76°36′51″W		
9	Baltimore Gas and Electric Company Building	Baltimore Gas and Electric Company Building	December 29, 2003 (#03001325)	39 W. Lexington St. 39°17′35″N 76°37′02″W	Central	
10	Baltimore General Dispensary	Baltimore General Dispensary	March 18, 1980 (#80001779)	500 W. Fayette St. 39°17′26″N 76°37′22″W	Central	
11	Baltimore Grand	Baltimore Grand	January 14, 2000 (#99001671)	401 W. Fayette St. 39°17′24″N 76°37′17″W	Central	
12	Baltimore Hebrew Congregation Synagogue	Baltimore Hebrew Congregation Synagogue	November 7, 1976 (#76002181)	1901 Madison Ave. 39°18′29″N 76°37′59″W	Central	
13	Battle Monument	Battle Monument	June 4, 1973 (#73002181)	Calvert St. between Fayette and Lexington Sts. 39°17′26″N 76°36′45″W	Central	
14	Belvedere Hotel	Belvedere Hotel	August 29, 1977 (#77001529)	1 E. Chase St. 39°18′08″N 76°36′58″W	Central	
15	Benson Building	Benson Building	March 26, 1980 (#80001782)	4 E. Franklin St. 39°17′43″N 76°36′55″W	Central	
16	Bolton Hill Historic District	Bolton Hill Historic District	September 17, 1971 (#71001031)	Roughly bounded by North Ave., Eutaw Pl., and the Pennsylvania Railroad tracks 39°18′25″N 76°37′36″W	Central	
17	Brewers Exchange	Brewers Exchange	March 28, 1985 (#85000652)	20 Park Ave. 39°17′26″N 76°37′06″W	Central	
18	Brown's Arcade	Brown's Arcade	January 17, 1983 (#83002927)	322-328 N. Charles St. 39°17′36″N 76°36′56″W	Central	
19	Alex Brown Building	Alex Brown Building	December 2, 1982 (#82001581)	135 E. Baltimore St. 39°17′22″N 76°36′45″W	Central	
20	Building at 409 West Baltimore Street	Building at 409 West Baltimore Street	December 1, 1994 (#94001395)	409 W. Baltimore St. 39°17′21″N 76°37′18″W	Central	
21	Building at 419 West Baltimore Street	Building at 419 West Baltimore Street	September 30, 1994 (#94001171)	419 W. Baltimore St. 39°17′21″N 76°37′20″W	Central	
22	Building at 423 West Baltimore Street	Building at 423 West Baltimore Street	February 10, 1995 (#94001607)	423 W. Baltimore St. 39°17′21″N 76°37′20″W	Central	
23	Buildings at 10, 12, 14, and 16 East Chase Street	Buildings at 10, 12, 14, and 16 East Chase Street	March 10, 1980 (#80001783)	10, 12, 14, and 16 E. Chase St. 39°18′11″N 76°36′56″W	Central	
24	Buildings at 1601–1830 St. Paul Street and 12–20 E. Lafayette Street	Buildings at 1601–1830 St. Paul Street and 12–20 E. Lafayette Street	December 27, 1984 (#84000502)	1601–1830 St. Paul St. and 12–20 E Lafayette St. 39°18′33″N 76°36′54″W	Central	
25	Business and Government Historic District	Business and Government Historic District	November 25, 1987 (#87002065)	Roughly bounded by Saratoga St., City Boulevard, and Water, Lombard, and Charles Sts. 39°17′24″N 76°36′39″W	Central	
26	Canton House	Canton House	December 13, 1978 (#78003140)	300 Water St. 39°17′20″N 76°36′39″W	Central	
27	Cathedral Hill Historic District	Cathedral Hill Historic District	April 27, 1987 (#87000622)	Roughly bounded by Hamilton, Saint Paul, Charles, Saratoga, and Cathedral Sts. 39°17′37″N 76°36′58″W	Central	
28	Cecil Apartments	Cecil Apartments	June 30, 2000 (#00000743)	1123 N. Eutlaw St. 39°18′11″N 76°37′29″W	Central	
29	Chamber of Commerce Building	Chamber of Commerce Building	February 2, 1983 (#83002929)	17 Commerce St. 39°17′20″N 76°36′36″W	Central	
30	CHESAPEAKE (lightship)	CHESAPEAKE (lightship)	August 1, 1980 (#80000349)	Inner Harbor; 39°17′08″N 76°36′34″W	Central	
31	Chinatown Historic District	Chinatown Historic District	March 4, 2024 (#100009990)	Bounded by Wilson Alley, Park Avenue, Montague Street, and Tyson Street; 39°17′38″N 76°37′09″W	Central	
32	Commercial Credit Company Building	Commercial Credit Company Building	April 17, 2018 (#100002331)	300-314 St. Paul Pl. 39°17′34″N 76°36′51″W	Central	
33	U.S.S. CONSTELLATION	U.S.S. CONSTELLATION	October 15, 1966 (#66000918)	Pier 1, Pratt St. 39°17′10″N 76°36′42″W	Central	
34	Continental Trust Company Building	Continental Trust Company Building	February 3, 1983 (#83002930)	1 S. Calvert St. 39°17′23″N 76°36′44″W	Central	
35	Davidge Hall, University of Maryland	Davidge Hall, University of Maryland	April 24, 1974 (#74002212)	522 W. Lombard St. 39°17′16″N 76°37′23″W	Central	Designated a National Historic Landmark September 25, 1997 (as College of Medicine of Maryland, Reference Number 97001275)
36	Emerson Bromo-Seltzer Tower	Emerson Bromo-Seltzer Tower	June 4, 1973 (#73002184)	312-318 Lombard St. 39°17′16″N 76°37′15″W	Central	
37	Erlanger Buildings	Erlanger Buildings	March 10, 1980 (#80001785)	519-531 W. Pratt St. 39°17′10″N 76°37′22″W	Central	
38	Eutaw-Madison Apartment House Historic District	Eutaw-Madison Apartment House Historic District	May 12, 1983 (#83002931)	2502 and 2525 Eutaw Pl., and 2601 Madison Ave. 39°18′55″N 76°38′18″W	Central	
39	Faust Brothers Building	Faust Brothers Building	December 7, 1994 (#94001383)	307-309 W. Baltimore St. 39°17′21″N 76°37′12″W	Central	
40	Federal Office Building	Federal Office Building	November 15, 2023 (#100009560)	31 Hopkins Plaza; 39°17′17″N 76°37′03″W	Central	
41	Federal Reserve Bank of Richmond, Baltimore Branch	Federal Reserve Bank of Richmond, Baltimore Branch	January 27, 1983 (#83002933)	114 E. Lexington St. 39°17′28″N 76°36′47″W	Central	
42	Fifth Regiment Armory	Fifth Regiment Armory	September 25, 1985 (#85002671)	210-247 W. Hoffman St. 39°18′12″N 76°37′19″W	Central	
43	First Presbyterian Church and Manse	First Presbyterian Church and Manse	June 18, 1973 (#73002186)	200-210 W. Madison St. 39°17′56″N 76°37′08″W	Central	
44	First Unitarian Church	First Unitarian Church	February 11, 1972 (#72001495)	2-12 W. Franklin St. 39°17′43″N 76°36′58″W	Central	
45	L. Frank & Son Building	L. Frank & Son Building	January 19, 1995 (#94001642)	407 W. Baltimore St. 39°17′21″N 76°37′18″W	Central	
46	Franklin Street Presbyterian Church and Parsonage	Franklin Street Presbyterian Church and Parsonage	November 5, 1971 (#71001036)	100 W. Franklin St. (church), 504 Cathedral St. (parsonage); 39°17′43″N 76°37′02″W	Central	
47	Gandy Belting Company Building	Gandy Belting Company Building	October 25, 1984 (#84000085)	726-734 W. Pratt St. 39°17′11″N 76°37′39″W	Central	
48	Garrett Building	Garrett Building	December 16, 1982 (#82001586)	233-239 Redwood St. 39°17′20″N 76°36′40″W	Central	
49	Heiser, Rosenfeld, and Strauss Buildings	Heiser, Rosenfeld, and Strauss Buildings	March 10, 1980 (#80001787)	32-42 S. Paca St. 39°17′16″N 76°37′21″W	Central	
50	Hippodrome	Hippodrome	January 14, 2000 (#99001670)	12 N. Eutaw St. 39°17′23″N 76°37′17″W	Central	
51	Home of the Friendless	Home of the Friendless	November 8, 2003 (#03001205)	1313 Druid Hill Ave. 39°18′08″N 76°37′45″W	Central	
52	Hotel Kernan	Hotel Kernan	September 3, 1999 (#99001079)	306-312 W. Franklin St. 39°17′42″N 76°37′15″W	Central	
53	Howard Street Tunnel	Howard Street Tunnel	July 2, 1973 (#73002187)	Beneath Howard St. from Mt. Royal Station to Camden Station; 39°18′17″N 76°37′15″W	Central	
54	Hutzler Brothers Palace Building	Hutzler Brothers Palace Building	June 7, 1984 (#84001348)	210-218 N. Howard St. 39°17′32″N 76°36′31″W	Central	
55	Lillie Carroll Jackson House		April 13, 2023 (#100008816)	1320 Eutaw Pl. 39°18′16″N 76°37′38″W		
56	Johnston Building	Johnston Building	September 26, 1994 (#94001166)	26-30 S. Howard St. 39°17′17″N 76°37′11″W	Central	
57	George Knipp & Brother Building	George Knipp & Brother Building	December 1, 1994 (#94001394)	121 N. Howard St. 39°17′28″N 76°37′10″W	Central	
58	Krug Iron Works	Krug Iron Works	April 29, 1982 (#82004747)	415 W. Saratoga St. 39°17′34″N 76°37′20″W	Central	
59	Lyric Theatre	Lyric Theatre	January 23, 1986 (#86000131)	124 W. Mt. Royal Ave. 39°18′20″N 76°37′09″W	Central	A major renovation has occurred.
60	Madison Avenue Methodist Episcopal Church	Madison Avenue Methodist Episcopal Church	September 4, 1992 (#92001153)	1327 Madison Ave. 39°18′14″N 76°37′40″W	Central	
61	Market Center	Market Center	February 4, 2000 (#00000040)	24 blocks surrounding the junction of Howard and Lexington Sts.; also the block bounded by Druid Hill Ave., West Centre St., North Howard St., West Monument St., and North Eutaw St. 39°17′33″N 76°37′15″W	Central	Second set of addresses represent a boundary increase approved August 21, 2023.
62	Mercantile Deposit and Trust	Mercantile Deposit and Trust	November 5, 2018 (#100003078)	111 W Baltimore St. 39°17′22″N 76°37′03″W		
63	Mercantile Trust and Deposit Company	Mercantile Trust and Deposit Company	March 17, 1983 (#83002935)	202 E. Redwood St. 39°17′21″N 76°36′45″W	Central	
64	Congressman Parren J. Mitchell House		June 29, 2023 (#100009062)	1805 Madison Ave. 39°18′26″N 76°37′55″W		
65	Mother Seton House	Mother Seton House	June 13, 1972 (#72001496)	600 N. Paca St. 39°17′44″N 76°37′23″W	Central	
66	Mount Royal Station	Mount Royal Station	June 18, 1973 (#73002191)	1400 Cathedral St. 39°18′20″N 76°37′14″W	Central	
67	Mount Vernon Place Historic District	Mount Vernon Place Historic District	November 11, 1971 (#71001037)	Mount Vernon Pl. and Washington Pl. 39°17′52″N 76°36′56″W	Central	
68	Mount Vernon Place United Methodist Church and Asbury House	Mount Vernon Place United Methodist Church and Asbury House	September 17, 1971 (#71001038)	2-10 E. Mount Vernon Place; 39°17′53″N 76°36′55″W	Central	
69	NOBSKA (steamship)	NOBSKA (steamship)	May 2, 1974 (#74002216)	Inner harbor 39°17′01″N 76°36′42″W	Central	Scrapped in 2006
70	Odd Fellows Hall	Odd Fellows Hall	March 25, 1980 (#80001789)	300 Cathedral St. 39°17′35″N 76°37′02″W	Central	
71	Old National Pike Milestones	Old National Pike Milestones	November 27, 1975 (#75002107)	U.S. Route 40; 39°25′13″N 77°16′01″W	TBD, perhaps multiple	
72	Old Pine Street Station	Old Pine Street Station	January 3, 1985 (#85000018)	214 N. Pine St. 39°17′30″N 76°37′40″W	Central	
73	Old Roman Catholic Cathedral	Old Roman Catholic Cathedral	October 1, 1969 (#69000330)	401 Cathedral St. 39°17′43″N 76°36′58″W	Central	
74	One Charles Center	One Charles Center	July 13, 2000 (#00000745)	100 N. Charles St. 39°17′45″N 76°37′22″W	Central	
75	Orchard Street United Methodist Church	Orchard Street United Methodist Church	November 12, 1975 (#75002096)	510 Orchard St. 39°17′51″N 76°37′28″W	Central	
76	Otterbein Church	Otterbein Church	October 28, 1969 (#69000324)	112 W. Conway St. 39°17′04″N 76°37′02″W	Central	
77	Paca Street Firehouse	Paca Street Firehouse	October 28, 1983 (#83003631)	106 N. Paca St. 39°17′27″N 76°36′44″W	Central	
78	Pascault Row	Pascault Row	January 29, 1973 (#73002193)	651-665 W. Lexington St. 39°17′28″N 76°37′35″W	Central	
79	Peale's Baltimore Museum	Peale's Baltimore Museum	October 15, 1966 (#66000915)	225 N. Holliday St. 39°17′31″N 76°36′38″W	Central	
80	Pennsylvania Station	Pennsylvania Station	September 12, 1975 (#75002097)	1525 N. Charles St. 39°18′28″N 76°36′57″W	Central	
81	Perkins Square Gazebo	Perkins Square Gazebo	July 28, 1983 (#83002937)	George St. and Myrtle Ave. 39°17′44″N 76°37′45″W	Central	
82	Pratt Street Power Plant	Pratt Street Power Plant	April 9, 1987 (#87000564)	601 E. Pratt St. 39°17′10″N 76°36′27″W	Central	
83	President Street Station	President Street Station	September 10, 1992 (#92001229)	Junction of President and Fleet Sts. 39°17′02″N 76°36′10″W	Central	
84	Ira Remsen House	Ira Remsen House	May 15, 1975 (#75002102)	214 Monument St. 39°17′51″N 76°37′10″W	Central	
85	Reservoir Hill Historic District	Reservoir Hill Historic District	December 23, 2004 (#04001376)	North Ave., Madison Ave., Druid Park Lake Dr., and Mt. Royal Terrace; 39°18′54″N 76°38′00″W	Central	
86	Rieman Block	Rieman Block	June 7, 1984 (#84001350)	617-631 W. Lexington St. 39°17′28″N 76°37′31″W	Central	
87	Henry August Rowland House	Henry August Rowland House	May 15, 1975 (#75002098)	915 Cathedral St. 39°18′02″N 76°37′02″W	Central	
88	St. Mary's Seminary Chapel	St. Mary's Seminary Chapel	November 11, 1971 (#71001046)	600 N. Paca St. 39°17′45″N 76°37′23″W	Central	
89	St. Paul's Church Rectory	St. Paul's Church Rectory	March 20, 1973 (#73002197)	24 W. Saratoga St. 39°17′34″N 76°36′57″W	Central	
90	St. Paul's Protestant Episcopal Church	St. Paul's Protestant Episcopal Church	March 30, 1973 (#73002198)	233 N. Charles St. 39°17′31″N 76°36′54″W	Central	
91	Sanitary Laundry Company Building	Sanitary Laundry Company Building	October 14, 1994 (#94001213)	118-120 N. Paca St. 39°17′27″N 76°37′22″W	Central	
92	Seton Hill Historic District	Seton Hill Historic District	July 30, 1975 (#75002099)	Bounded by Pennsylvania Ave. and Franklin, Eutaw, McCulloh, and Orchard Sts. 39°17′47″N 76°37′24″W	Central	
93	Seven-Foot Knoll Lighthouse	Seven-Foot Knoll Lighthouse	August 22, 1989 (#89001096)	Pier 5, Inner Harbor; 39°17′02″N 76°36′21″W	Central	
94	Sharp Street Memorial United Methodist Church and Community House	Sharp Street Memorial United Methodist Church and Community House	July 21, 1982 (#82004749)	508-516 Dolphin St. and 1206-1210 Etting St. 39°18′03″N 76°37′44″W	Central	
95	Standard Oil Building	Standard Oil Building	December 1, 2000 (#00001461)	501 St. Paul St. 39°17′43″N 76°36′49″W	Central	
96	Stewart's Department Store	Stewart's Department Store	September 3, 1999 (#99001078)	226-232 W. Lexington St. 39°17′31″N 76°37′10″W	Central	
97	Swiss Steam Laundry Building	Swiss Steam Laundry Building	June 20, 1985 (#85001271)	100-102 N. Greene St. 39°17′25″N 76°37′29″W	Central	
98	Terminal Warehouse	Terminal Warehouse	November 14, 1978 (#78003144)	211 E. Pleasant St. 39°17′36″N 76°36′40″W	Central	
99	U.S. Custom House	U.S. Custom House	February 15, 1974 (#74002217)	40 S. Gay St. 39°17′18″N 76°36′34″W	Central	
100	USS TORSK (submarine)	USS TORSK (submarine)	January 14, 1986 (#86000090)	Pier IV, Pratt St. 39°17′05″N 76°36′33″W	Central	
101	Union Baptist Church	Union Baptist Church	December 30, 2009 (#09001173)	1219 Druid Hill Ave. 39°18′06″N 76°37′41″W	Central	
102	United States Parcel Post Station	United States Parcel Post Station	December 27, 2002 (#02001595)	1501 St. Paul St. 39°18′24″N 76°36′51″W	Central	
103	Upton	Upton	July 27, 1994 (#94000764)	811 W. Lanvale St. 39°17′53″N 76°37′56″W	Central	
104	William H. Welch House	William H. Welch House	January 7, 1976 (#76002186)	935 St. Paul St. 39°18′07″N 76°36′51″W	Central	
105	Westminster Presbyterian Church and Cemetery	Westminster Presbyterian Church and Cemetery	September 17, 1974 (#74002218)	509 W. Fayette St. 39°17′24″N 76°37′26″W	Central	
106	Woman's Industrial Exchange	Woman's Industrial Exchange	December 19, 1978 (#78003145)	333 N. Charles St. 39°17′36″N 76°36′55″W	Central	
107	Young Men's and Young Women's Hebrew Association Building	Young Men's and Young Women's Hebrew Association Building	November 14, 1985 (#85002836)	305-311 W. Monument St. 39°17′50″N 76°37′15″W	Central	
108	Zion Lutheran Church	Zion Lutheran Church	December 30, 2011 (#11000960)	400 E. Lexington St. 39°17′29″N 76°36′37″W	Central	

== Former listings ==
	Name on the Register	Image	Date listed	Date removed	Location	District	Description
1	Building at 100 Hopkins Place		April 14, 1983 (#83002928)	May 19, 1986	100 Hopkins Place	Central	Peoples Bank Building

== See also ==
- National Register of Historic Places listings in Maryland
