= William H. Welch House =

Historic house in Maryland, United States

- U.S. National Register of Historic Places
- U.S. National Historic Landmark
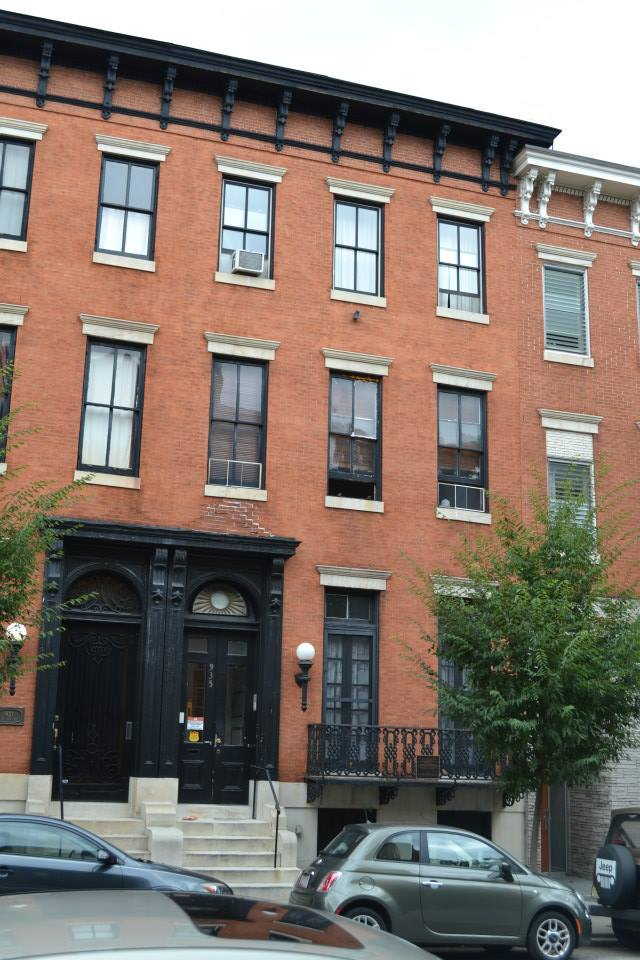

- Location within Baltimore Location within Maryland Location within the United States
- Location: 935 St. Paul St., Baltimore, Maryland
- Coordinates: 39°18′3.1″N 76°36′50.7″W
- Built: 1891
- NRHP reference No.: 76002186

Significant dates
- Added to NRHP: January 7, 1976
- Designated NHL: January 7, 1976

The William H. Welch House is a three-story rowhouse located at 935 St. Paul Street in Baltimore, Maryland. Probably built in the 1880s, it is notable as the residence of William H. Welch (1850–1934) from 1891 to 1908. Welch was one of the "Big Four" founding professors at Johns Hopkins Hospital, and an important conduit of European medical research methods and ideas to the United States. He was also the first dean of the Johns Hopkins University School of Medicine and the first director of the Johns Hopkins School of Hygiene and Public Health. The house was designated a National Historic Landmark in 1976, and is included in the Baltimore National Heritage Area.

== Description and history ==
The William H. Welch House is located on the northeast side of Baltimore's Mount Vernon neighborhood, on the east side of St. Paul Street just south of its junction with East Eager Street. It is the right side of a pair of mirror-image three-story brick rowhouses, which share a cornice with the corner building immediately on their left. The main entrance is in the leftmost of three bays, framed by an elaborate surround that has paneled pilasters, a half-round transom, and a bracketed cornice. Windows are set in rectangular openings, with slightly corniced lintels. The building has no particular architectural significance.

William H. Welch lived in this house from about 1891 to 1908, and at the now-altered 807 St. Paul Street from then until his death. Welch, educated Yale and Columbia in medicine and chemistry, after which he spend four years in Europe (mainly at universities in what is now Germany) absorbing the medical and research practices there. After being offered a position at the new Johns Hopkins University in 1883, he again traveled to Europe, after which he established a research laboratory modeled on those he saw at German universities. He was influential in training a whole generation of medical researches in these practices, effectively propelling medical research in the United States to a level comparable to the state of the art seen in Europe.

== See also ==
- List of National Historic Landmarks in Maryland
- National Register of Historic Places listings in Central Baltimore
