= College of Medicine of Maryland =

Historic building in Maryland, USA

- U.S. National Register of Historic Places
- U.S. National Historic Landmark
- Baltimore City Landmark
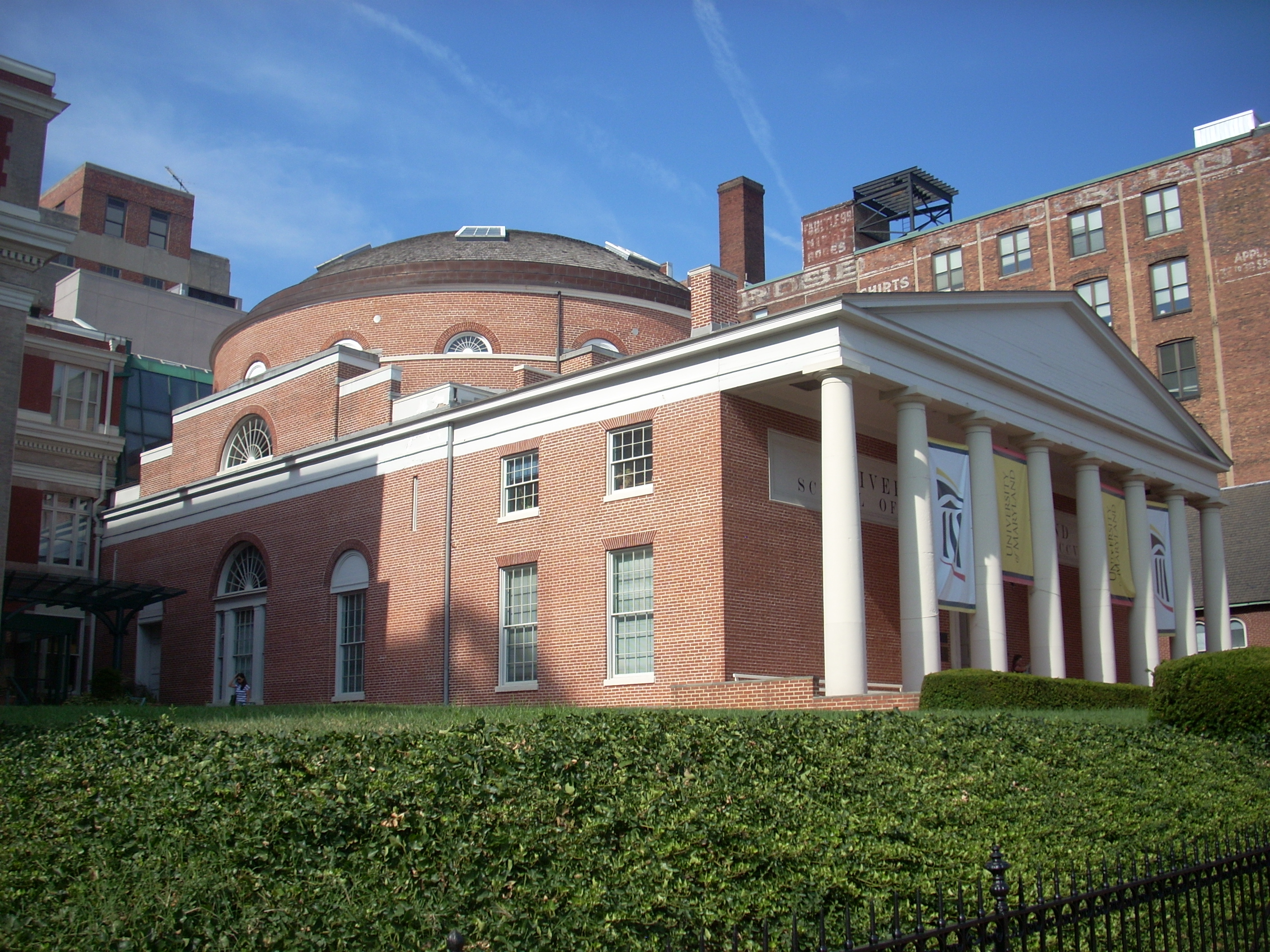
- Davidge Hall in 2011

- Location within Baltimore Location within Maryland Location within the United States
- Location: 522 West Lombard Street, at northeast corner with South Greene Street, Baltimore, Maryland
- Coordinates: 39.28778°N 76.62315°W
- Built: 1812
- Architect: Long, Robert Cary Sr.
- Architectural style: Greek Revival
- NRHP reference No.: 97001275

Significant dates
- Added to NRHP: September 25, 1997
- Designated NHL: September 25, 1977
- Designated BCL: 1975

The College of Medicine of Maryland, or also known since 1959 as Davidge Hall, is a historic domed structure in Baltimore, Maryland. It has been in continuous use for medical education since 1813, the oldest such structure in the United States. A wide pediment stands in front of a low, domed drum structure, which housed the anatomical theater. A circular chemistry hall was housed on the lower level under the anatomical theater.

== Design ==
Like the dome at Thomas Jefferson's Monticello, the design of Davidge Hall's dome was inspired by the architectural principles envisioned by 16th century French architect Philibert de l'Orme (1514-1570). This type of dome, commonly referred to as a Delorme Dome, is characterized by having a skeleton of wood slats over which waterproof material is placed.

The supervising architect was Robert Cary Long Sr., a famous local father-son team of architects who also designed many other famous buildings in the city. The front portico facing West Lombard Street (formerly King George Street) is of wood construction with Doric columns. To the west is South Greene Street (named for Revolutionary War Gen. Nathanael Greene, (1742-1786), and aide to Gen. George Washington of the Continental Army)

== History ==
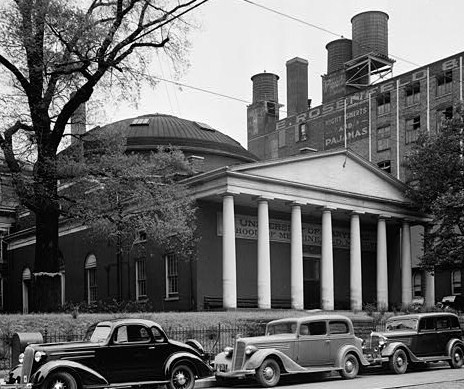
University of Maryland, Medical Building, July 1936

Davidge Hall was named for the founder and first dean of the College of Medicine of Maryland, Dr. John Beale Davidge. The College of Medicine is the oldest public and fifth oldest medical school in the United States. Dr. Davidge, along with James Cocke and John Shaw, offered medical instruction in a small theater beginning in late 1807. In November of that year, a mob broke into Davidge's small domed theater, took the cadaver and dragged it through the streets. In December, the Maryland General Assembly passed a bill establishing a college of medicine. A lot was obtained for construction of a building in 1811. Evidence exists that in addition to Robert Cary Long Jr., early design work may have also been performed by French émigré architect J. Maximilian M. Godefroy, son-in-law of Dr. Crawford (who also did work on the Battle Monument during 1815–1827, in Baltimore's former Courthouse Square at North Calvert, between East Lexington and Fayette Streets and the First Independent Church of Baltimore (later First Unitarian Church of Baltimore (Unitarian and Universalist) at West Franklin and North Charles Streets in 1817, both of which still stand. Work began in 1812 and was completed the following year.

The use of the name "Davidge Hall" did not appear until about 1959, when a previous UMAB campus building of the same name was demolished.

Davidge Hall was listed on the National Register of Historic Places on September 25, 1977 and made a National Historic Landmark on September 25, 1997. Davidge Hall is also considered the oldest building in continuous use for medical education in the Northern Hemisphere. It is included within the Baltimore City National Heritage Area.

== See also ==
- List of National Historic Landmarks in Maryland
- National Register of Historic Places listings in Central Baltimore
