= Henry August Rowland House =

Historic house in Maryland, United States

- U.S. National Register of Historic Places
- U.S. National Historic Landmark
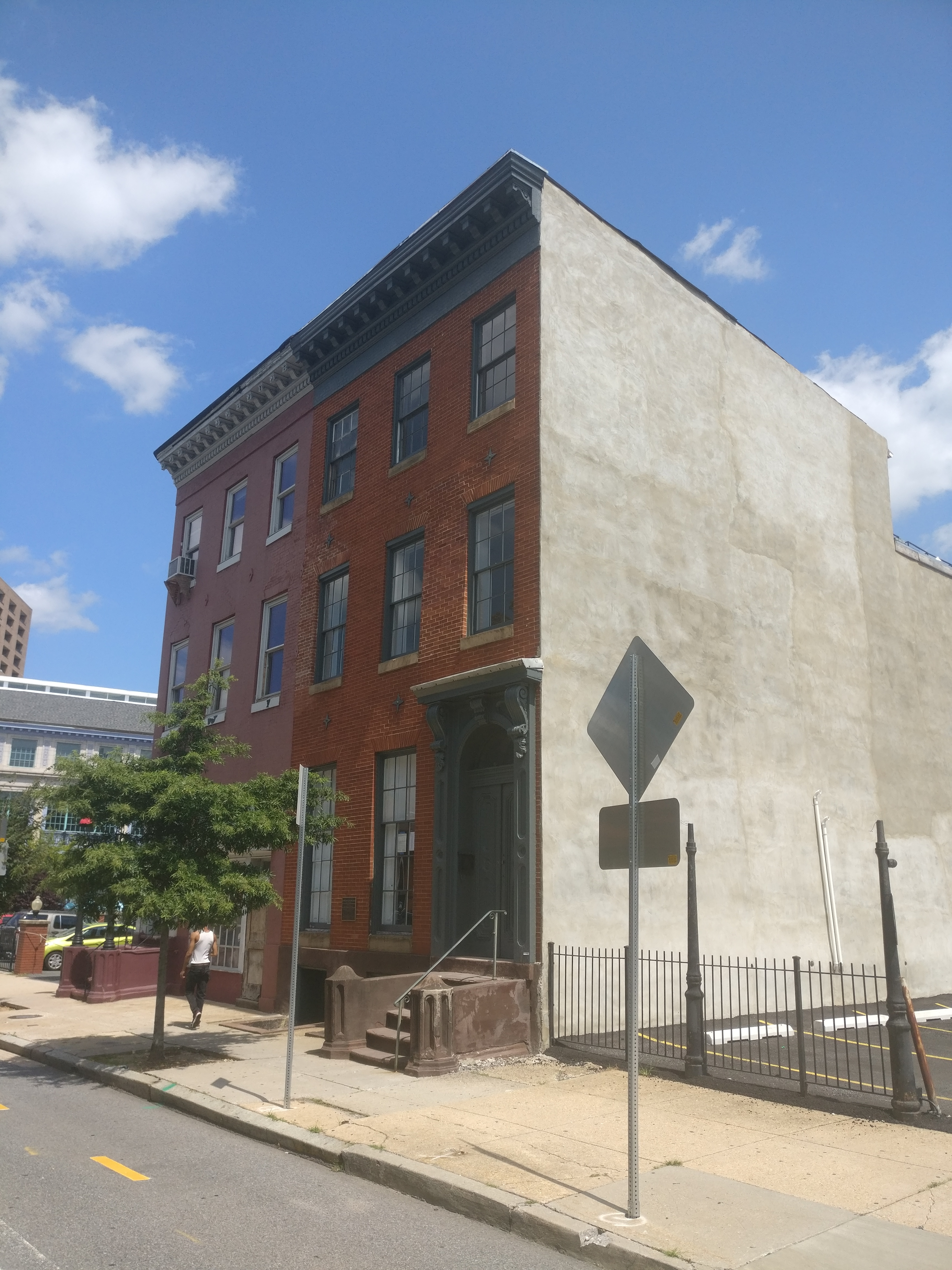

- Location within Baltimore Location within Maryland Location within the United States
- Location: 915 Cathedral St., Baltimore, Maryland
- Coordinates: 39°18′2″N 76°37′2″W
- Built: c. 1885
- NRHP reference No.: 75002098

Significant dates
- Added to NRHP: May 15, 1975
- Designated NHL: May 15, 1975

The Henry August (or Augustus) Rowland House is a historic row house at 915 Cathedral Street in Baltimore, Maryland. Built in the 1880s, this nondescript row house is historically important as the home of physicist Henry Augustus Rowland (b. 1846) from 1889-90 until his death in 1901. It was listed on the National Register of Historic Places and declared a National Historic Landmark in 1975.

== Description and history ==
The Henry August Rowland House is located on the north side of Baltimore's Mount Vernon neighborhood, at the northeast corner of Cathedral and Brexton Streets. It is the southern of two adjacent row houses, which are typical of brick rowhouses built in the fashionable residential area in the 1880s. It is three stories in height, built out of red brick, and topped by a flat roof with a projecting carved wooden cornice. It is three bays wide, with the entrance in the rightmost bay, sheltered by an elaborate surround toppedy a shallow projecting bracketed hood. The building interior was reported in 1975 to be in good condition, with original features including a working dumbwaiter.

Rowland purchased the house in 1889 or 1890 and lived there until his death in 1901. His wife and daughter continued to live there after his death. He was educated as a physicist at Rensselaer Polytechnic Institute and in Germany, and was hired in 1876 by Daniel Coit Gilman to help build the physics department of Johns Hopkins University. His achievements include advancements in tools and understanding of magnetism, and the development of a formula for translating heat into mechanical work. His best known work is in the development of a high-precision diffraction grating for doing spectral analysis. Isaac Asimov characterized Rowland as "one of the few important 19th century American physicists."

== See also ==
- List of National Historic Landmarks in Maryland
- National Register of Historic Places listings in Central Baltimore
