= Ira Remsen House =

Historic house in Maryland, United States

- U.S. National Register of Historic Places
- U.S. National Historic Landmark
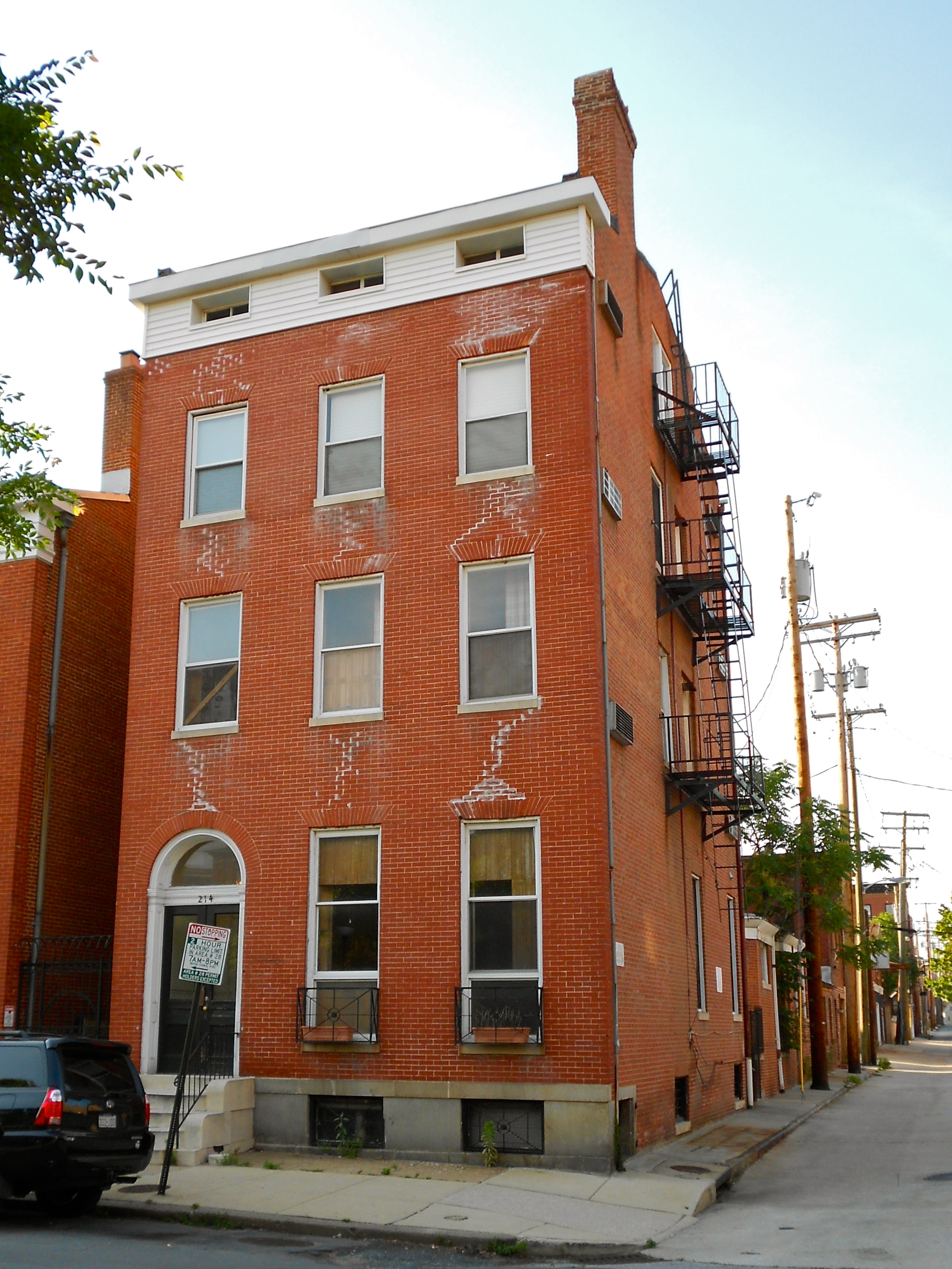
- Ira Remsen House, May 2012

- Location within Baltimore Location within Maryland Location within the United States
- Location: 214 W. Monument Street, Baltimore, Maryland
- Coordinates: 39°17′51″N 76°37′10″W
- Built: c. 1885
- NRHP reference No.: 75002102

Significant dates
- Added to NRHP: May 15, 1975
- Designated NHL: May 15, 1975

The Ira Remsen House is a historic house at 214 West Monument Street in Baltimore, Maryland. Built in the 1880s, this undistinguished row house was the home of Ira Remsen (1846-1927), a noted chemist and educator who served as president of Johns Hopkins University from 1901 to 1913, and influenced a generation of chemists and chemistry researches with his textbooks and pedagogical methods. This house was listed on the National Register of Historic Places and designated a National Historic Landmark in 1975.

== Description and history ==
The Ira Remsen House stands on the west side of Baltimore's Mount Vernon neighborhood, on the north side of West Monument Street at its junction with Tyson Street. The house is a typical row house of no particular architectural distinction. It is a three-story brick row house with a gabled roof. Its facade is three bays wide, with the main entrance in the leftmost bay, set in a rounded-arch opening. Windows are in unadorned rectangular openings with stone sills, and a wood-frame shed-roof dormer extends across the roof. The house was renovated in 1945, when the cornice was replaced, the front sandblasted, and the interior divided into three apartments.

The house is significant as the residence between 1901 and 1925 of Ira Remsen. Educated in Germany as a chemist, Remsen came to Johns Hopkins University in 1876 to help build its chemistry department. His most notable research discovery was saccharine, but he was much more widely inspirational in his teaching methods and textbooks, which influenced a generation of students and teachers. In 1901, the year he moved into this house, he was named president of the university, succeeding Daniel Coit Gilman. He served as president until 1913, and remained active in the chemistry department until 1925. His ashes are buried on the Johns Hopkins campus, at Remsen Hall, named in his honor.

== See also ==
- List of National Historic Landmarks in Maryland
- National Register of Historic Places listings in Central Baltimore
