= United States Parcel Post Station =

Historic building in Maryland, USA

- U.S. National Register of Historic Places
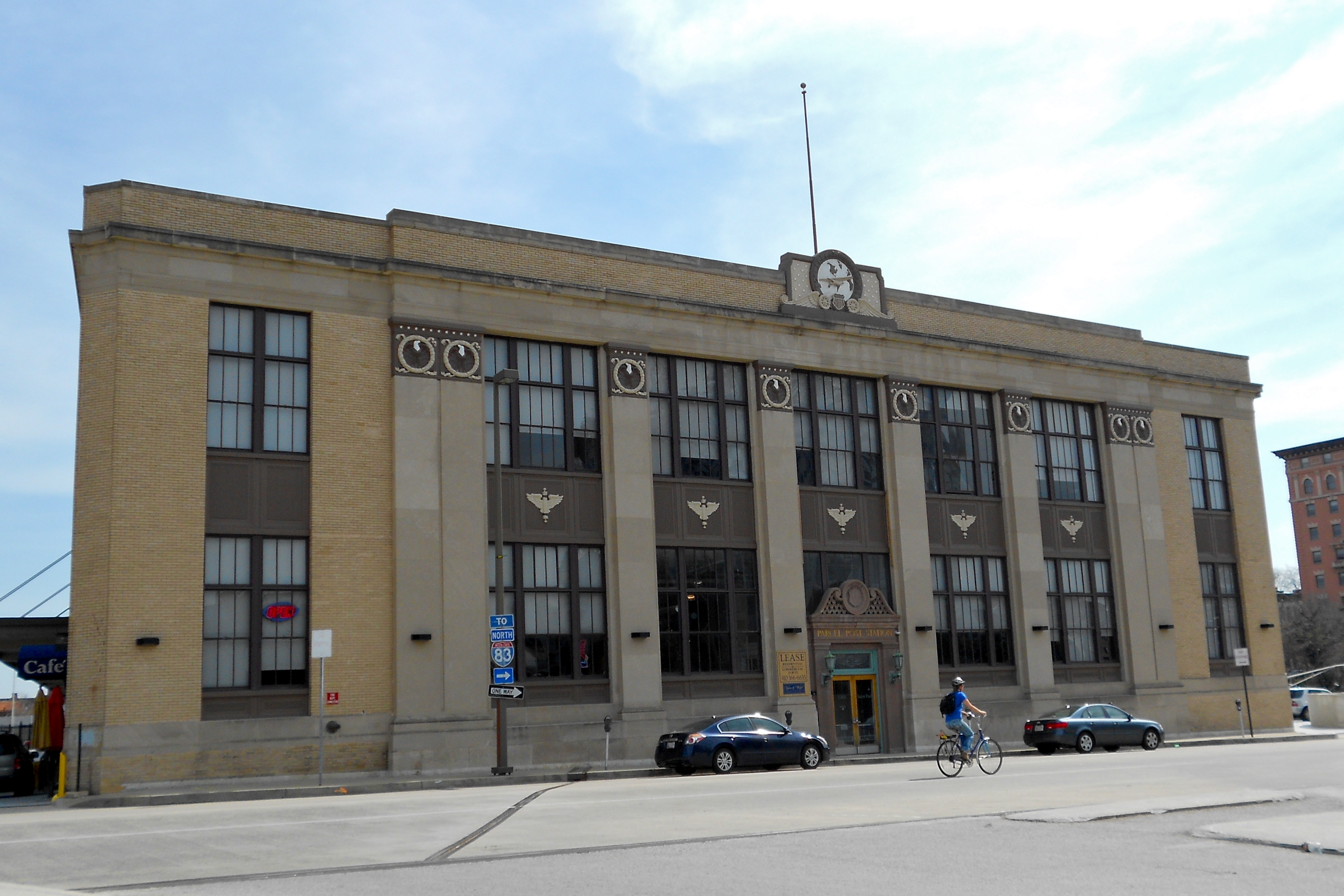
- United States Parcel Post Station, March 2012

- Location within Baltimore Location within Maryland Location within the United States
- Location: 1501 St. Paul St., Baltimore, Maryland
- Coordinates: 39°18′24″N 76°36′51″W
- Area: 1.6 acres (0.65 ha)
- Built: 1929
- Architect: Bishop, Knowlton & Crossen; Consolidated engineering co.
- Architectural style: Classical Revival
- NRHP reference No.: 02001595
- Added to NRHP: December 27, 2002

United States Parcel Post Station, also known as the Railway Express Building, is a historic post office structure located at Baltimore, Maryland, United States. It is two stories high with the first floor at the St. Paul Street level and is supported by concrete piers that extend 35 feet down to the level of the Jones Falls Expressway (I-83). It was constructed in 1929 in a Classical Revival style and built of reinforced concrete with brick walls and limestone and terra cotta trim, the building is a parallelogram in plan, measuring 142 feet on the east and west and 269 feet deep. The principal facade features a 4 foot high limestone base and terra cotta capitals molded in the form of an American bald eagle within a wreath. The St. Paul Street facility and its location next to the Pennsylvania Railroad according to the U.S. Post Office Department in 1928 "would affect handling of parcel-post matter in Washington and delivery points as far as New York and Canada." Finally, the station was the first air rights development in the city.

United States Parcel Post Station was listed on the National Register of Historic Places in 2002. It is included in the Baltimore National Heritage Area.
