= List of National Historic Landmarks in Maryland =

This is a List of National Historic Landmarks in Maryland. There are currently 76 National Historic Landmarks (NHLs) in Maryland. Also included are short lists of former NHLs and of other historic sites of national importance administered by the National Park Service.

== Key ==
	National Historic Landmark
^{†}	National Historic Landmark District
^{#}	National Historic Site, National Historical Park, National Memorial, or National Monument
^{*}	Delisted Landmark

== Current NHLs ==
The NHLs are distributed over 17 of Maryland's 23 counties and its one county-equivalent, the independent city of Baltimore.

For consistency, places are listed by their National Historic Landmark program names.

	Landmark name	Image	Date designated	Location	County	Description
1	Accokeek Creek Site	Accokeek Creek Site	July 19, 1964 (#66000909)	Accokeek; 38°41′46″N 77°03′07″W	Prince George's	Archaeological site of a palisaded village occupied from ca. A.D. 1300 to ca. 1630
2	Army Medical Museum and Library	Army Medical Museum and Library	January 12, 1965 (#66000854)	Silver Spring; 39°00′32″N 77°03′14″W	Montgomery	This listing presently encompasses a US military medical records and research collection that dates to the 1860s. The original building in Washington, D.C. was demolished in 1969; the collection is now principally with the National Museum of Health and Medicine. The landmark designation is undergoing review.
3	BALTIMORE (Tug)	BALTIMORE (Tug)	November 4, 1993 (#93001613)	Baltimore; 39°16′22″N 76°36′01″W	City of Baltimore	Oldest steam-powered tugboat in operation in the United States
4	Baltimore and Ohio Transportation Museum and Mount Clare Station	Baltimore and Ohio Transportation Museum and Mount Clare Station	September 15, 1961 (#66000906)	Baltimore; 39°17′01″N 76°37′57″W	City of Baltimore	Part of oldest American railyard; site of first passenger rail service and first telegraph message. Collections of 19th- and 20th-century artifacts related to America's railroads; 250 pieces of railroad rolling stock; 15,000 artifacts; four nineteenth-century buildings, including the historic roundhouse; a mile of historic track. Larg
5^{#}	Clara Barton House	Clara Barton House	January 12, 1965 (#66000037)	Glen Echo; 38°58′03″N 77°08′28″W	Montgomery	Home of Clara Barton; American pioneer teacher, nurse, and humanitarian; founder of the American Red Cross
6	Bollman Truss Railroad Bridge	Bollman Truss Railroad Bridge	February 16, 2000 (#72000582)	Savage; 39°08′05″N 76°49′31″W	Howard	Sole surviving example of the first successful all-metal bridge design to be adopted and consistently used on a railroad
7	Brice House	Brice House	April 15, 1970 (#70000259)	Annapolis; 38°58′45″N 76°29′14″W	Anne Arundel	Preserved 18th century Georgian style brick house
8	Carrollton Viaduct	Carrollton Viaduct	November 11, 1971 (#71001032)	Baltimore; 39°16′24″N 76°39′19″W	City of Baltimore	Oldest operating railway bridge in the world.
9	Rachel Carson House	Rachel Carson House	December 4, 1991 (#91002058)	Silver Spring; 39°02′48″N 77°00′03″W	Montgomery	House where Rachel Carson wrote her classic work Silent Spring in 1962
10	Casselmans Bridge, National Road	Casselmans Bridge, National Road	January 29, 1964 (#66000391)	Grantsville; 39°41′48″N 79°08′37″W	Garrett	Bridge built in 1813 on the National Road, the nation's first major public works project
11^{†}	Whittaker Chambers Farm	Whittaker Chambers Farm	May 17, 1988 (#88001824)	Westminster; 39°39′35″N 76°58′35″W	Carroll	Farm home of Whittaker Chambers, accuser of Alger Hiss; papers hidden here in a pumpkin led to Hiss's conviction; Chambers wrote Witness, his best-selling autobiography, here
12	Chase-Lloyd House	Chase-Lloyd House	April 15, 1970 (#70000260)	Annapolis; 38°58′52″N 76°29′18″W	Anne Arundel	Three-story brick Georgian mansion dating from 1769-1774
13^{†}	Chestertown Historic District	Chestertown Historic District	April 15, 1970 (#70000263)	Chestertown; 39°12′45″N 76°04′10″W	Kent	Boundary increases were approved in 1984 and 2026.
14	College of Medicine of Maryland	College of Medicine of Maryland	September 25, 1997 (#97001275)	Baltimore; 39°17′16″N 76°37′23″W	City of Baltimore	Oldest medical school building in the U.S.
15^{†}	Colonial Annapolis Historic District	Colonial Annapolis Historic District	June 23, 1965 (#66000383)	Annapolis; 38°58′41″N 76°29′29″W	Anne Arundel	NRHP 66000383, and boundary increase NRHP 84003875, in 1984.
16	USS CONSTELLATION (Frigate)	USS CONSTELLATION (Frigate)	May 23, 1963 (#66000918)	Baltimore; 39°17′03″N 76°36′42″W	City of Baltimore	Constructed in 1854; sloop-of-war, or corvette; second United States Navy ship to carry this famous name
17	Doughoregan Manor	Doughoregan Manor	November 11, 1971 (#71000376)	Ellicott City; 39°16′36″N 76°53′35″W	Howard	Built in 1766; until 1832 home of Charles Carroll, last surviving signer of the Declaration of Independence
18	EDNA E. LOCKWOOD (Bugeye)	EDNA E. LOCKWOOD (Bugeye)	April 19, 1994 (#86000258)	St. Michaels; 38°47′08″N 76°13′10″W	Talbot	Built in 1889; Chesapeake Bay bugeye; last working oyster boat of her kind
19	Ellicott City Station	Ellicott City Station	November 24, 1968 (#68000025)	Ellicott City; 39°15′56″N 76°47′43″W	Howard	
20	First Unitarian Church	First Unitarian Church	November 7, 1973 (#72001495)	Baltimore; 39°17′36″N 76°36′58″W	City of Baltimore	
21	Fort Frederick	Fort Frederick	November 7, 1973 (#73000939)	Big Pool; 39°36′33″N 78°01′17″W	Washington	
22	Frieda Fromm-Reichmann Cottage	Frieda Fromm-Reichmann Cottage	January 13, 2021 (#100006277)	Rockville; 39°04′59″N 77°09′44″W	Montgomery	
23	Gaithersburg Latitude Observatory	Gaithersburg Latitude Observatory	December 20, 1989 (#85001578)	Gaithersburg; 39°08′05″N 77°11′57″W	Montgomery	
24^{†}	Greenbelt, Maryland Historic District	Greenbelt, Maryland Historic District	February 18, 1997 (#80004331)	Greenbelt; 39°00′10″N 76°53′28″W	Prince George's	
25^{#}	Habre-de-venture	Habre-de-venture	November 11, 1971 (#72001595)	Port Tobacco; 38°31′43″N 77°01′54″W	Charles	Now the Thomas Stone National Historic Site.
26	Hammond-Harwood House	Hammond-Harwood House	October 9, 1960 (#66000384)	Annapolis; 38°58′52″N 76°29′18″W	Anne Arundel	
27	HILDA M. WILLING (Skipjack)	HILDA M. WILLING (Skipjack)	April 19, 1994 (#85001089)	Tilghman; 38°42′40″N 76°19′53″W	Talbot	
28	His Lordship's Kindness	His Lordship's Kindness	April 15, 1970 (#70000853)	Rosaryville; 38°46′44″N 76°50′34″W	Prince George's	Also known as Poplar Hill.
29	Homewood	Homewood	November 11, 1971 (#71001033)	Baltimore; 39°19′39″N 76°37′09″W	City of Baltimore	
30	KATHRYN (Skipjack)	KATHRYN (Skipjack)	April 19, 1994 (#85001090)	Tilghman Island; 38°42′40″N 76°19′53″W	Talbot	
31	Kennedy Farm	Kennedy Farm	November 7, 1973 (#73000941)	Samples Manor; 39°22′47″N 77°42′56″W	Washington	Headquarters for John Brown's 1859 raid on Harpers Ferry.
32	LIGHTSHIP NO. 116 "CHESAPEAKE"	LIGHTSHIP NO. 116 "CHESAPEAKE"	December 20, 1989 (#80000349)	Baltimore; 39°17′01″N 76°36′34″W	City of Baltimore	Built in 1930 at Charleston Drydock & Machine Co; took on the name of whatever station she was anchored at
33	London Town Publik House	London Town Publik House	April 15, 1970 (#70000262)	Woodland Beach; 38°56′23″N 76°32′25″W	Anne Arundel	A county alms house
34	J. C. Lore Oyster House	J. C. Lore Oyster House	August 7, 2001 (#84003869)	Solomons; 38°19′26″N 76°27′40″W	Calvert	
35	Maryland Statehouse	Maryland Statehouse	December 19, 1960 (#66000385)	Annapolis; 38°58′36″N 76°29′28″W	Anne Arundel	
36	Elmer V. McCollum House	Elmer V. McCollum House	January 7, 1976 (#76002182)	Baltimore; 39°18′49″N 76°41′06″W	City of Baltimore	Home of nutrition researcher Elmer McCollum.
37	H. L. Mencken House	H. L. Mencken House	July 28, 1983 (#83004384)	Baltimore; 39°17′08″N 76°38′29″W	City of Baltimore	A home of author H. L. Mencken. The house is included in the Union Square-Hollins Market Historic District.
38	Minor Basilica of the Assumption of the Blessed Virgin Mary	Minor Basilica of the Assumption of the Blessed Virgin Mary	November 11, 1971 (#69000330)	Baltimore; 39°17′36″N 76°36′58″W	City of Baltimore	
39	Monocacy Battlefield	Monocacy Battlefield	November 8, 1973 (#66000908)	Frederick; 39°22′16″N 77°23′31″W	Frederick	
40	Montpelier	Montpelier	April 15, 1970 (#70000852)	Laurel; 39°03′54″N 76°50′42″W	Prince George's	
41	Mount Clare	Mount Clare	April 15, 1970 (#70000860)	Baltimore; 39°16′37″N 76°38′37″W	City of Baltimore	
42	Mount Royal Station and Trainshed	Mount Royal Station and Trainshed	December 8, 1976 (#73002191)	Baltimore; 39°18′14″N 76°37′14″W	City of Baltimore	
43^{†}	Mount Vernon Place Historic District	Mount Vernon Place Historic District	November 11, 1971 (#71001037)	Baltimore; 39°17′51″N 76°36′56″W	City of Baltimore	
44	NELLIE CROCKETT (Buy-boat)	NELLIE CROCKETT (Buy-boat)	April 19, 1994 (#94001185)	Georgetown; 39°21′40″N 75°52′55″W	Kent	Chesapeake Bay oyster buy-boat; built in 1926.
45	Old Lock Pump House, Chesapeake and Delaware Canal	Old Lock Pump House, Chesapeake and Delaware Canal	January 12, 1965 (#66000390)	Chesapeake City; 39°31′26″N 75°48′39″W	Cecil	
46	William Paca House	William Paca House	November 11, 1971 (#71000364)	Annapolis; 38°58′46″N 76°29′17″W	Anne Arundel	
47	Peale's Baltimore Museum	Peale's Baltimore Museum	December 21, 1965 (#66000915)	Baltimore; 39°17′24″N 76°36′38″W	City of Baltimore	
48	Phoenix Shot Tower	Phoenix Shot Tower	November 11, 1971 (#69000373)	Baltimore; 39°17′19″N 76°36′20″W	City of Baltimore	
49	Edgar Allan Poe House	Edgar Allan Poe House	November 11, 1971 (#71001043)	Baltimore; 39°17′21″N 76°38′00″W	City of Baltimore	
50	REBECCA T. RUARK (Skipjack)	REBECCA T. RUARK (Skipjack)	July 31, 2003 (#85001095)	Tilghman Island; 38°42′46″N 76°19′53″W	Talbot	
51	Ira Remsen House	Ira Remsen House	May 15, 1975 (#75002102)	Baltimore; 39°17′51″N 76°37′09″W	City of Baltimore	
52	Riversdale Mansion	Riversdale Mansion	December 9, 1997 (#73002166)	Riverdale; 38°57′37″N 76°55′55″W	Prince George's	
53	Henry August Rowland House	Henry August Rowland House	May 15, 1975 (#75002098)	Baltimore; 39°18′02″N 76°37′02″W	City of Baltimore	Home of physicist Henry Augustus Rowland.
54^{†}	St. Mary's City Historic District	St. Mary's City Historic District	August 4, 1969 (#69000310)	St. Marys City; 38°11′21″N 76°25′56″W	St. Mary's	
55	St. Mary's Seminary Chapel	St. Mary's Seminary Chapel	November 11, 1971 (#71001046)	Baltimore; 39°17′38″N 76°37′23″W	City of Baltimore	
56	N.S. SAVANNAH (Nuclear Ship)	N.S. SAVANNAH (Nuclear Ship)	July 17, 1991 (#82001518)	Baltimore; 39°15′30″N 76°33′20″W	City of Baltimore	
57	Schifferstadt	Schifferstadt	December 23, 2016 (#100000833)	Frederick; 39°25′24″N 77°25′39″W	Frederick County	
58	Sheppard and Enoch Pratt Hospital and Gate House	Sheppard and Enoch Pratt Hospital and Gate House	November 11, 1971 (#71000369)	Towson; 39°23′28″N 76°37′09″W	Baltimore County	
59	Sion Hill	Sion Hill	April 27, 1992 (#90000608)	Havre De Grace; 39°33′58″N 76°07′39″W	Harford	
60	Sotterley	Sotterley	February 16, 2000 (#72001487)	Hollywood; 38°22′47″N 76°32′20″W	St. Mary's	
61	Spacecraft Magnetic Test Facility	Spacecraft Magnetic Test Facility	October 3, 1985 (#85002811)	Greenbelt; 39°00′17″N 76°49′31″W	Prince George's	
62	Star-Spangled Banner Flag House	Star-Spangled Banner Flag House	December 16, 1969 (#69000320)	Baltimore; 39°17′08″N 76°36′13″W	City of Baltimore	House where Mary Young Pickersgill sewed the large Star-Spangled Banner flag of the United States, to fly over Fort McHenry, inspiring the U.S. national anthem.
63	Peggy Stewart House	Peggy Stewart House	November 7, 1973 (#73000887)	Annapolis; 38°58′55″N 76°29′14″W	Anne Arundel	
64	USCGC WHEC-37 (Coast Guard cutter)	USCGC WHEC-37 (Coast Guard cutter)	June 7, 1988 (#88001826)	Baltimore; 39°17′09″N 76°36′23″W	City of Baltimore	
65	Thomas Point Shoal Light Station	Thomas Point Shoal Light Station	January 20, 1999 (#75000864)	Annapolis; 38°53′56″N 76°26′10″W	Anne Arundel	
66	Thomas Viaduct, Baltimore & Ohio Railroad	Thomas Viaduct, Baltimore & Ohio Railroad	January 28, 1964 (#66000388)	Relay; 39°13′12″N 76°42′49″W	Baltimore County & Howard County	
67	Tolson's Chapel and School	Tolson's Chapel and School	January 13, 2021 (#100006233)	111 E. High St. 39°27′22″N 77°44′47″W	Washington	
68	USS TORSK (Submarine)	USS TORSK (Submarine)	January 14, 1986 (#86000090)	Baltimore; 39°16′58″N 76°36′33″W	City of Baltimore	
69	Tulip Hill	Tulip Hill	April 15, 1970 (#70000261)	Galesville; 38°51′03″N 76°33′02″W	Anne Arundel	
70	United States Naval Academy	United States Naval Academy	July 4, 1961 (#66000386)	Annapolis; 38°59′04″N 76°29′20″W	Anne Arundel	
71	Washington Aqueduct	Washington Aqueduct	November 7, 1973 (#73002123)	Great Falls, MD and Washington, DC; 38°56′15″N 77°06′51″W	Montgomery, MD and District of Columbia	Also in District of Columbia
72	William Henry Welch House	William Henry Welch House	January 7, 1976 (#76002186)	Baltimore; 39°18′00″N 76°36′51″W	City of Baltimore	
73	West St. Mary's Manor	West St. Mary's Manor	April 15, 1970 (#70000854)	Drayden; 38°11′10″N 76°26′54″W	St. Mary's	
74	Whitehall	Whitehall	October 9, 1960 (#66000387)	Annapolis; 39°00′15″N 76°25′37″W	Anne Arundel	
75	WILLIAM. B. TENNISON (Buy-Boat)	WILLIAM. B. TENNISON (Buy-Boat)	April 19, 1994 (#80001799)	Solomons; 38°19′23″N 76°27′39″W	Calvert	
76	Wye House	Wye House	April 15, 1970 (#70000264)	Easton; 38°51′12″N 76°10′06″W	Talbot	

== Historic areas of the NPS in Maryland ==
National Historical Parks, some National Monuments, and certain other areas listed in the National Park system are historic landmarks of national importance that are highly protected already, often before the inauguration of the NHL program in 1960, and are then often not also named NHLs per se. The National Park Service lists these together with the NHLs in the state.

The Clara Barton National Historic Site, Monocacy National Battlefield and Thomas Stone National Historic Site are also NHLs and are listed above (with the latter under its alternative name, Habre de Venture).

	Landmark name	Image	Date established	Location	County	Description
1	Antietam National Battlefield	Burnside's Bridge	August 30, 1890	Sharpsburg	Washington	
2	Chesapeake and Ohio Canal National Historical Park		January 8, 1971	Maryland	multiple counties	Also included in District of Columbia and West Virginia
3	Fort McHenry National Monument and Historic Shrine	Fort McHenry	March 3, 1925 (National Park); August 11, 1939 (National Monument)	Baltimore	City of Baltimore	
4	Fort Washington Park		May 29, 1930	Fort Washington	Prince George's County	
5	Hampton National Historic Site		June 22, 1948	Hampton, Maryland	Baltimore County	
6	Harpers Ferry National Historical Park		June 30, 1944 (National Monument); May 29, 1963 (National Historical Park)	Maryland	Washington County	Also included in Virginia and West Virginia
7	Piscataway Park		October 4, 1961	Accokeek	Prince George's County	

== Former National Historic Landmarks ==
There is one former NHL, Resurrection Manor, which was demolished in 2002 and subsequently delisted.

#	Landmark name	Image	Date designated	Date withdrawn	Locality	County	Description
1	Resurrection Manor		April 15, 1970	February 17, 2006	Hollywood vicinity 38.338056°N 76.509444°W	St. Mary's	Demolished in 2002 and replaced by a modern home.

== See also ==
- National Register of Historic Places listings in Maryland
- List of National Historic Landmarks by state
- List of National Natural Landmarks in Maryland
