= Peabody Bookshop and Beer Stube =

Bookstore in Baltimore, Maryland, US

Coordinates: 39°18′01″N 76°36′56″W

The Peabody Bookshop and Beer Stube was a bookshop with a bar in the Mount Vernon section of Baltimore, Maryland, for over 50 years.

== History ==
Brothers Hugo and Siegfried Weisberger, Austrian immigrants, started the bookshop in 1922, during Prohibition. Siegfried became sole owner in 1931, when Hugo died. The bookshop was located at 913 N. Charles Street, within walking distance of the Walters Art Gallery, the George Peabody Library, the Joseph Meyerhoff Symphony Hall, Baltimore's Washington Monument, and the Brexton Hotel. It occupied the front of the building with a room at the back where customers could buy beer and sandwiches. This was an early example of a bookshop with its own beer bar, and possibly the very first such in the US. The bar had a piano on one wall, mounted animal heads, and wooden tables carved with the names of patrons. A regular feature was a 15 minute magic show at 10:00 PM performed by "Dantini the Magnificent". The bookshop also served as an art gallery for local artists.

Weisberger abandoned the Peabody in 1954, convinced by long time patron H. L. Mencken, that the "Age of the Boob" had arrived, and people were no longer interested in "books and ideals and culture. They only want dollars." When Siegfried walked away from "100,000 volumes nobody wants to read", the news was covered widely including in Detroit, Wilmington, Delaware and Santa Cruz.

Later in 1954 the Peabody reopened under the ownership of Paul P. Adler and Irving Mindess and remained popular with students from the University of Maryland. Rose Boyajian Smith Pettus Hayes took ownership of the shop in 1957 and ran it until she died in 1986. Under her ownership a second bar was added upstairs. She was also active in preserving other Baltimore properties, including revitalizing the Brexton Hotel.

In the 1970s the Peabody hosted Saturday film festivals. In 1979, the Peabody suffered the loss of two long-time performers: singer–violinist Max Rathje who knew every regular's favorite song, and Vincent Cierkes, popularly known as “Dantini the Magnificent."

The shop closed shortly after the death of Hayes. The building at 913 North Charles Street was demolished in 1997, to make way for a parking lot.

== Patrons of note ==
- H. L. Mencken
- Gerald Johnson
- Patrick Skene Catling
- Roger Zelazny from 1965-1975.

== In fiction ==
Natalie Standiford based Carmichael's Bookshop, in "How to Say Goodbye in Robot" on the Peabody Bookshop.
