= Faust Brothers Building =

Historic building in Maryland, USA

- U.S. National Register of Historic Places
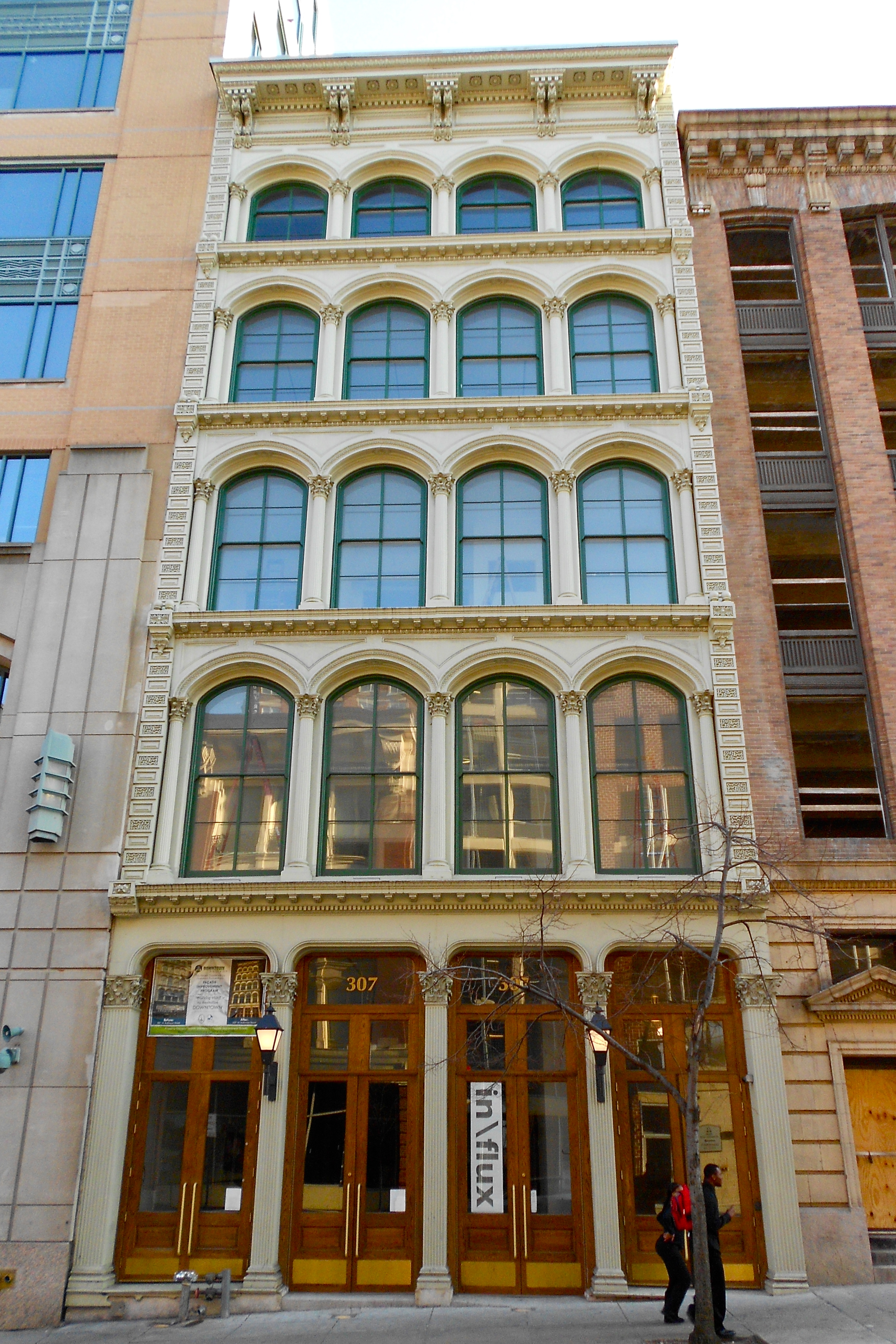
- Faust Brothers Building, March 2012

- Location within Baltimore Location within Maryland Location within the United States
- Location: 307-309 W. Baltimore St., Baltimore, Maryland
- Coordinates: 39°17′21″N 76°37′12″W
- Area: less than one acre
- Built: 1875
- Architect: Bennett, Benjamin F.
- Architectural style: Italianate
- MPS: Cast Iron Architecture of Baltimore MPS
- NRHP reference No.: 94001383
- Added to NRHP: December 7, 1994

Faust Brothers Building, also known as the Trading Post, is a historic retail building located at Baltimore, Maryland, United States. It is a five-story brick commercial building with a cast-iron façade above an altered storefront, erected about 1875. It is the only known example of cast-iron fronts on the front and back sides.

The Faust Brothers Building was listed on the National Register of Historic Places in 1994. It is included within the Baltimore National Heritage Area.
