= Old Baltimore College of Dental Surgery =

Historic building in Maryland, USA

- Baltimore College of Dental Surgery
- U.S. National Register of Historic Places
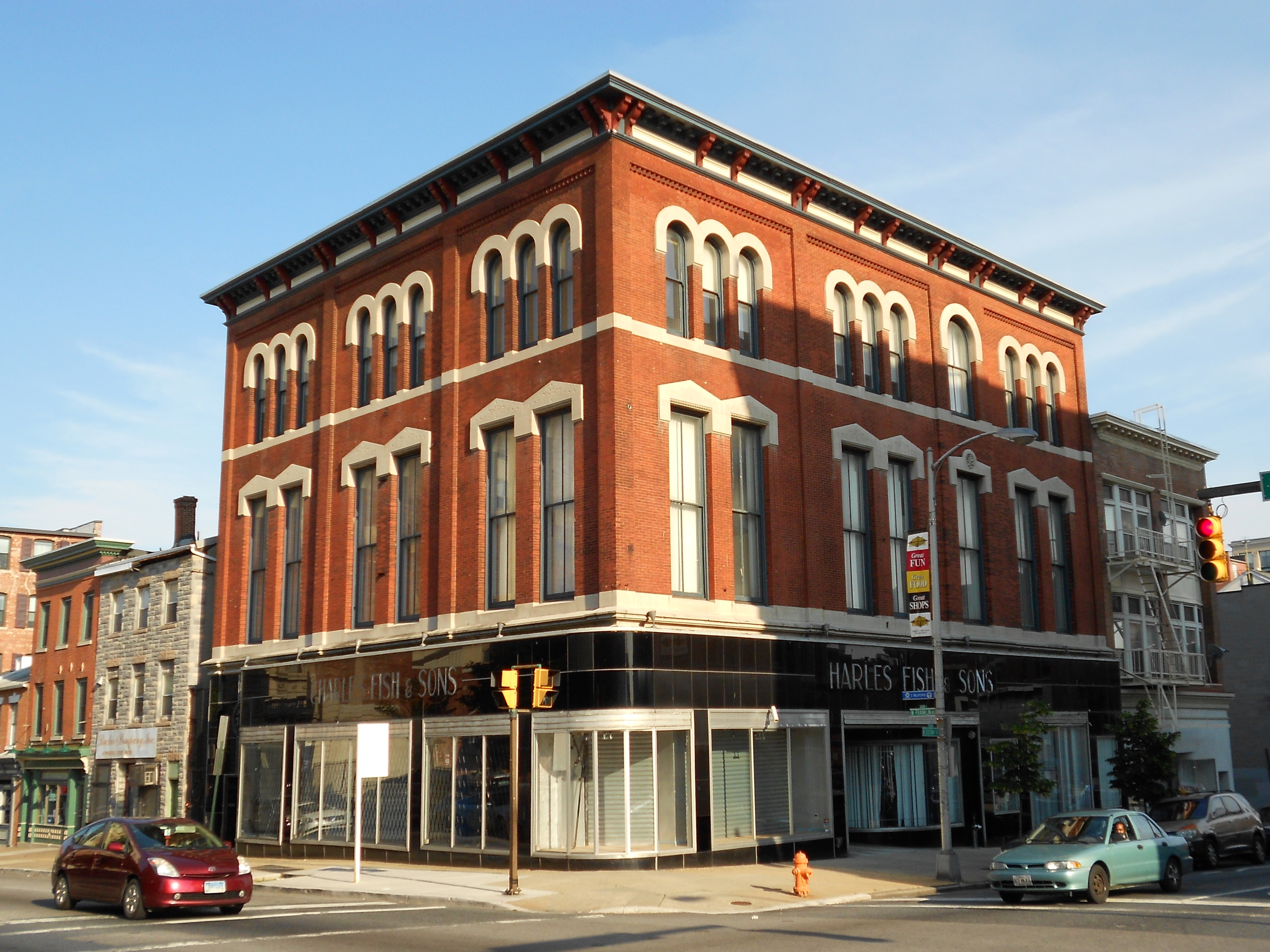

- Location within Baltimore Location within Maryland Location within the United States
- Location: 429-433 N. Eutaw St., Baltimore, Maryland
- Coordinates: 39°17′41″N 76°37′16″W
- Area: less than one acre
- Built: c. 1870
- Architectural style: Late Victorian, Italianate
- NRHP reference No.: 87000697
- Added to NRHP: May 8, 1987

The Old Baltimore College of Dental Surgery is a historic commercial building on North Eutaw Street in Baltimore, Maryland. The three-story brick building was built in 1881, and served as the fifth location of the Baltimore College of Dental Surgery, the nation's first dental school. It is one of two surviving 19th century addresses of the school, which was founded in 1839. The building's first floor, which was always used for commercial and retail purposes, has seen some remodeling, but the upper floors, used by the school, have retained a great deal of historic integrity.

The building was listed on the National Register of Historic Places in 1987.

== See also ==
- National Register of Historic Places listings in Central Baltimore
