= Woman's Industrial Exchange =

Historic building in Maryland, USA

- U.S. National Register of Historic Places
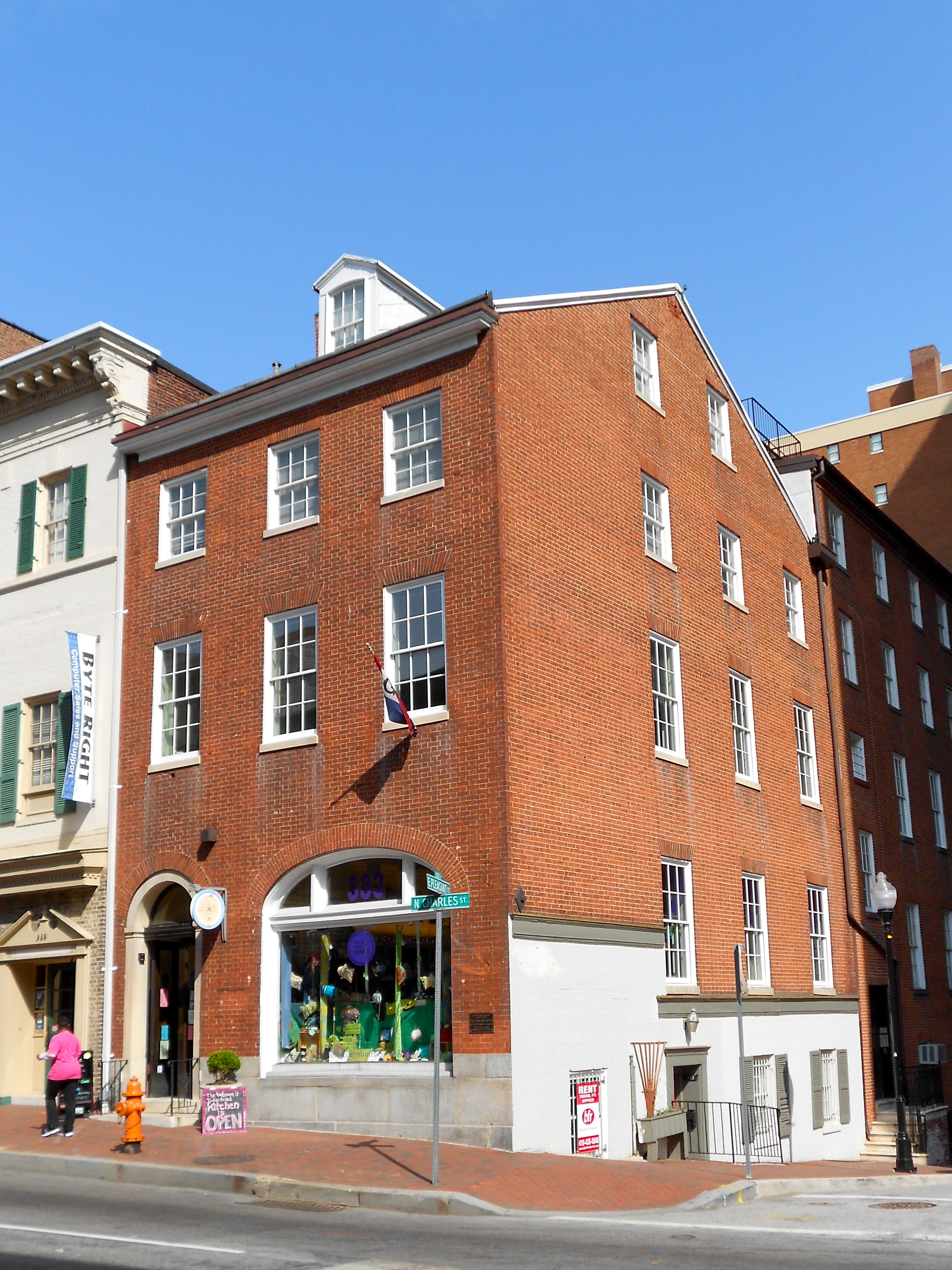
- Woman's Industrial Exchange, March 2012

- Location within Baltimore Location within Maryland Location within the United States
- Location: 333 N. Charles St., Baltimore, Maryland
- Coordinates: 39°17′37.1″N 76°36′55″W
- Area: 0.1 acres (0.040 ha)
- Built: 1815
- NRHP reference No.: 78003145
- Added to NRHP: December 19, 1978

Woman's Industrial Exchange is a historic building located at 333 North Charles Street, Baltimore, Maryland, United States. It consists of a townhouse erected in 1815, with a large, five-story structure appended to the rear. The building was purchased in 1860 by Mrs. Mary E. Boardley for a boarding house, and she added the rear wing. The Exchange purchased the building in 1889. A shop window was added circa 1900, which enhances the fine Flemish bond brickwork and marble stoop. The mixed-use building houses the shop and offices of The Woman's Industrial Exchange, two restaurants, and seven residential apartments.

== The organization ==
The Woman's Industrial Exchange of Baltimore City was a non-profit organization that was founded in 1880, incorporated in 1882, and continues to serve the same mission of providing local people the opportunity to earn income by selling handmade items to the public.

The Woman's Industrial Exchange began shortly after the Civil War in the home of Mrs. G. Harmon Brown of Baltimore, where women brought their handwork to be sold to local citizens and visitors. Mrs. Harmon's endeavor was part of a nationwide Exchange Movement to help women in need discreetly earn a living.

In 1880 the enterprise was so successful that a shop was opened at Saratoga and Holiday Streets. In 1882 the State Legislature incorporated the organization "for the purpose of endeavoring by sympathy and practical aid to encourage and help needy women to help themselves by procurring for them and establishing a sales room for the sale of Women's Work."

In the late 1800s The Exchange sold women's handwork, operated a Tea Room and gave instructions in needlework and cooking. Consignors provided quality handmade items to be sold in the shop. The Exchange continues to serve its non-profit mission as an outlet of hand-crafted goods made by women and men intent on supporting themselves with dignity.

The Woman's Industrial Exchange building was listed on the National Register of Historic Places in 1978. It is included in the Baltimore National Heritage Area.

The Woman's Industrial Exchange officially ceased operations on June 15, 2020.
