= Erlanger Buildings =

Historic building in Maryland, USA

- U.S. National Register of Historic Places
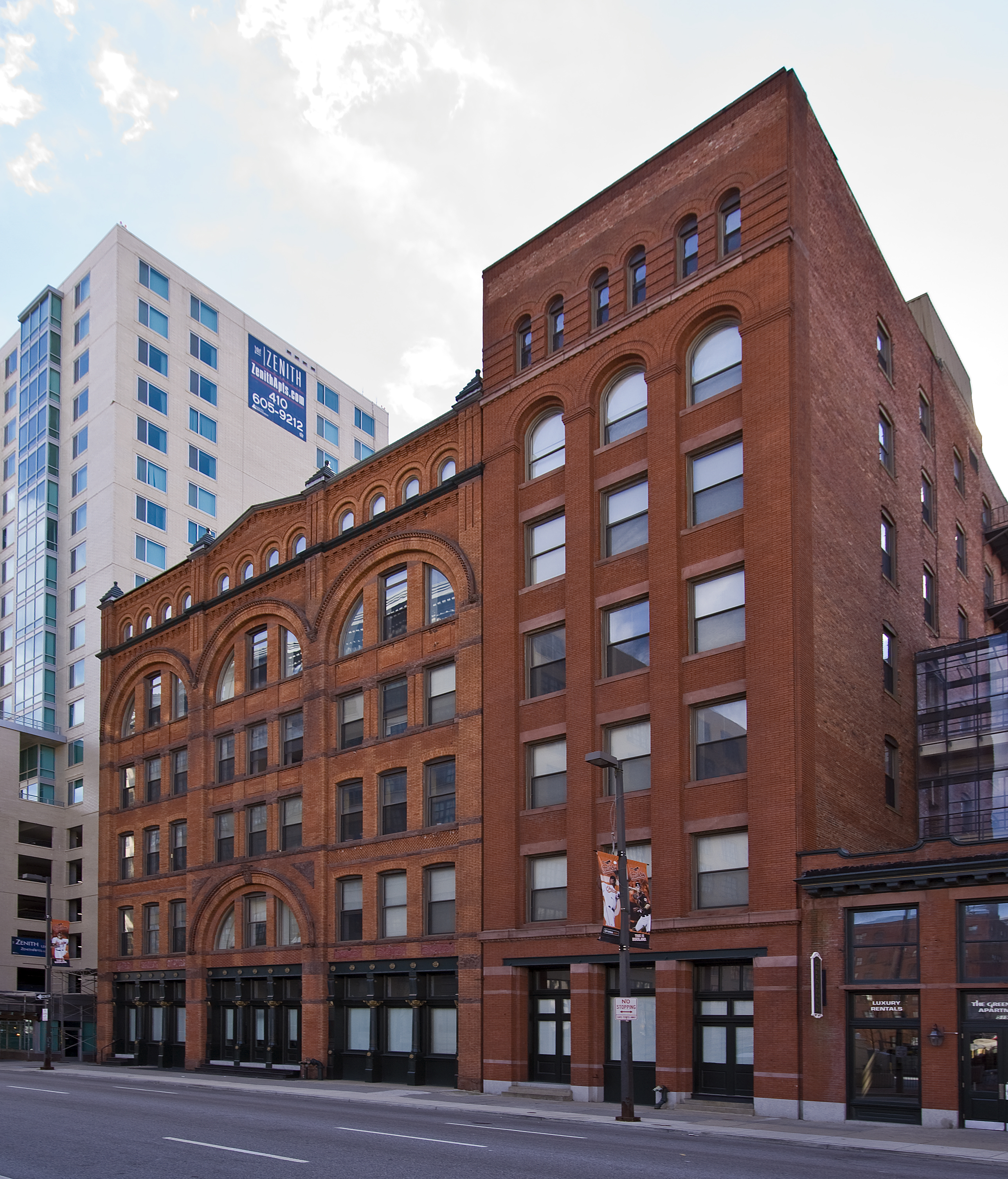
- Erlanger Buildings, February 2012

- Location within Baltimore Location within Maryland Location within the United States
- Location: 519-531 W. Pratt St., Baltimore, Maryland
- Coordinates: 39°17′10″N 76°37′22″W
- Area: 0.7 acres (0.28 ha)
- Built: 1892
- Architect: Lafferty, John E.; Et al.
- Architectural style: Chicago, Late Victorian, The Commercial Style
- NRHP reference No.: 80001785
- Added to NRHP: March 10, 1980

Erlanger Buildings is a historic loft building located at Baltimore, Maryland, United States. It consists of a four-structure, turn-of-the-20th-century loft complex. The buildings range in size from two to six stories high and feature iron storefronts and stone detailing. They were built between 1892 and 1910. The buildings served as the home of the Erlanger Manufacturing Company, which produced BVD brand underwear. Charles Erlanger, co-founder of the company, is credited with making major advances in the design of underwear which revolutionized the industry.

The Erlanger Buildings were listed on the National Register of Historic Places in 1980. They are included in the Baltimore National Heritage Area.
