= Peggy Stewart House =

Historic house in Maryland, United States

- U.S. National Register of Historic Places
- U.S. National Historic Landmark
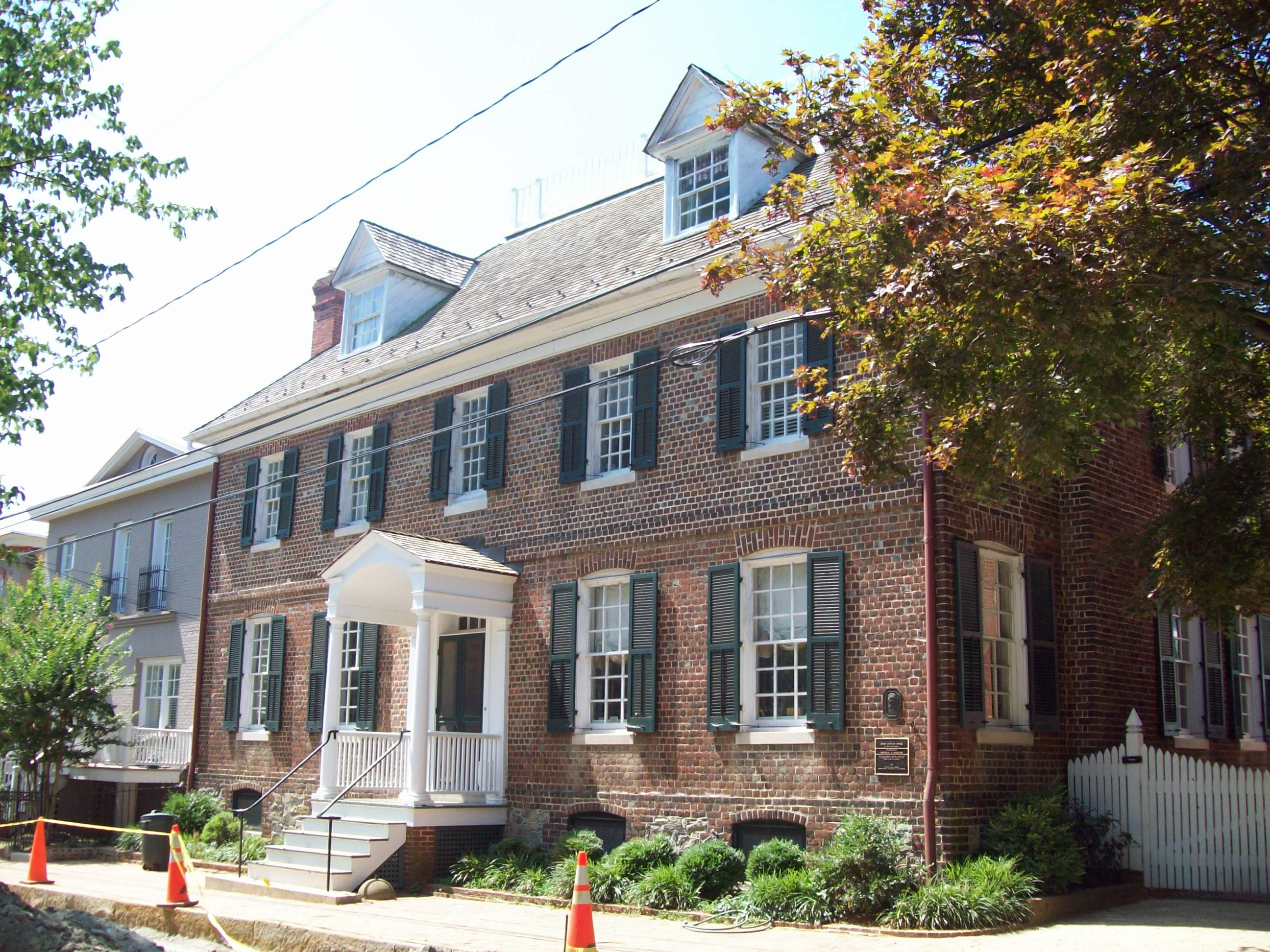
- Peggy Stewart House, July 2009

- Location within Maryland Location within the United States
- Location: Annapolis, Maryland
- Coordinates: 38°58′53.4″N 76°29′13.4″W
- Built: 1764
- Architect: Rutland, Thomas
- Architectural style: Georgian
- NRHP reference No.: 73000887

Significant dates
- Added to NRHP: November 7, 1973
- Designated NHL: November 7, 1973

The Peggy Stewart House, also known as the Rutland-Jenifer-Stone House, is a Georgian-style house in Annapolis, Maryland. Built between 1761 and 1764 by Thomas Rutland as a rental property, it was owned at various times by Thomas Stone and U.S. Founding Father Daniel of St. Thomas Jenifer. In October 1774 it was owned by Anthony Stewart, owner of the ship Peggy Stewart. It was listed in the National Register of Historic Places in 1973 for its associations with the burning of Anthony Stewart's ship, Peggy Stewart, as well as for its architectural significance as a mid- to late 18th century Georgian mansion. Furthermore, the dwelling was recognized as a National Historic Landmark for its associations with Jenifer and Stone, and for the thematic representation of politics and diplomacy (1763 - 1783) during the American Revolution

== Description ==
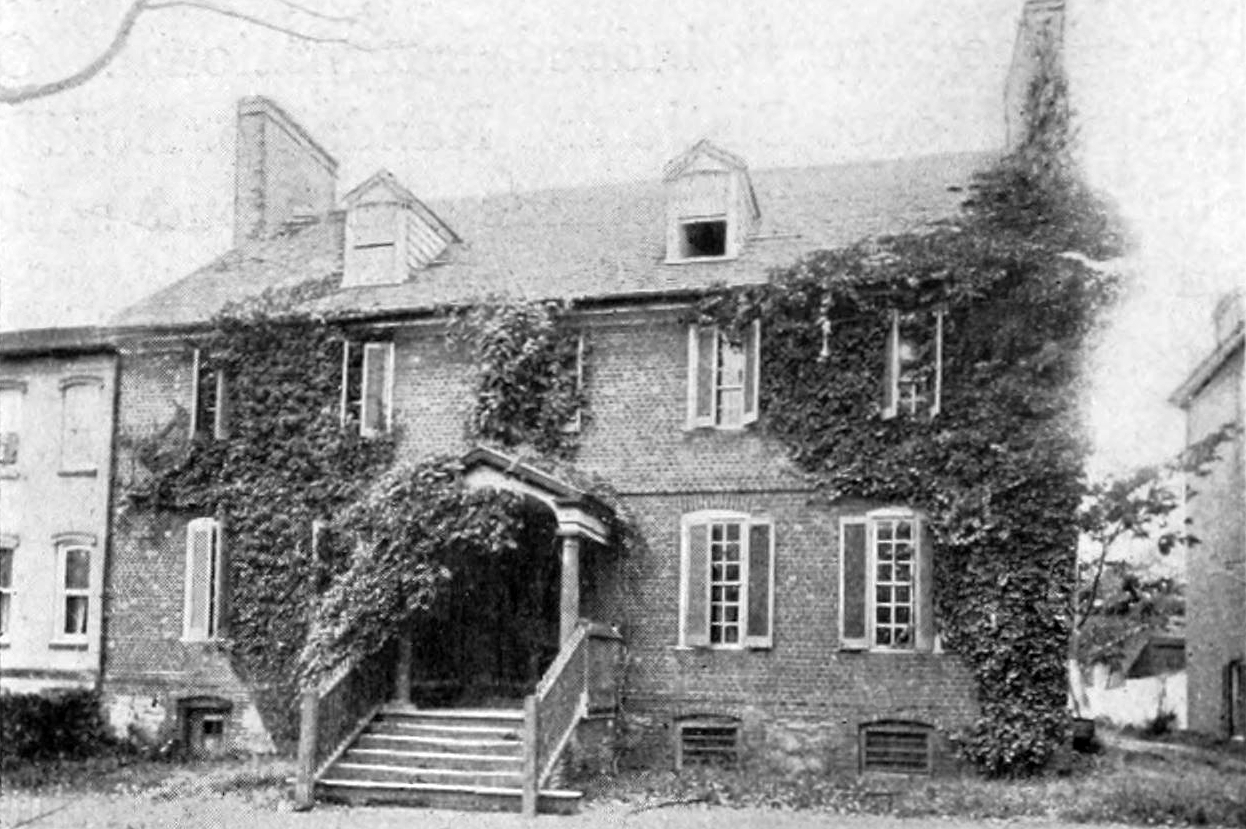
Peggy Stewart House, circa 1890

The Peggy Stewart House is a 2 1/2-story Georgian style brick house on an elevated basement. The original rectangular house is about 50 feet (15 m) wide and 30 feet (9.1 m) deep, or five bays by three. The side elevations feature single-bay projecting pavilions, crowned with pediments projecting from the hipped main roof. The basement and first floor windows have segmental arches, while the second floor windows have flat arches, all with stone sills. Both the front and rear facades are all-header bond, while the remaining sides are English bond. The present roof form was built in 1894 during a significant remodeling. The large brick wing to the rear was an addition that replaced a wooden structure during the 1894 remodelling, as was the addition of the roof-top balustrade.

The interior features a central hall plan. A living room or large parlor occupies the entire space to the left of the hall. A dining room and a parlor are on the right side of the hall. There are six bedrooms upstairs. The interior has been extensively altered, with original woodwork remaining only in one bedroom. The home is located near Gate 3 of the United States Naval Academy and remains a private residence.

== History ==
The Peggy Stewart House was built between 1761 and 1764 for Thomas Rutland, who sold the house in January 1772 to Daniel of St. Thomas Jenifer, agent and receiver-general for the last two Lord Proprietors of Maryland. He was president of the Maryland Council of Safety in 1775 and became president of the Maryland Senate when it was formed in 1777. Jenifer served in the Continental Congress from 1778 until 1782 and was a delegate to the Federal Convention in Philadelphia. In July 1772 Jenifer sold the house to Anthony Stewart, an Annapolis merchant who owned the cargo ship Peggy Stewart, which Stewart was forced to burn by Annapolis citizens outraged that he had paid the unpopular tea tax. Stewart fled to Canada in 1774, and his wife, Jean Dick Stewart, sold the house back to Jenifer in 1779. Jenifer sold the house to Thomas Stone in 1783, then re-acquired it in 1787 upon Stone's death, holding it until his own death in 1790.

== See also ==
- List of National Historic Landmarks in Maryland
- National Register of Historic Places listings in Anne Arundel County, Maryland
