= First Unitarian Church (Baltimore) =

Historic church in Maryland, US

- First Unitarian Church of Baltimore
- U.S. National Register of Historic Places
- U.S. National Historic Landmark
- Baltimore City Landmark
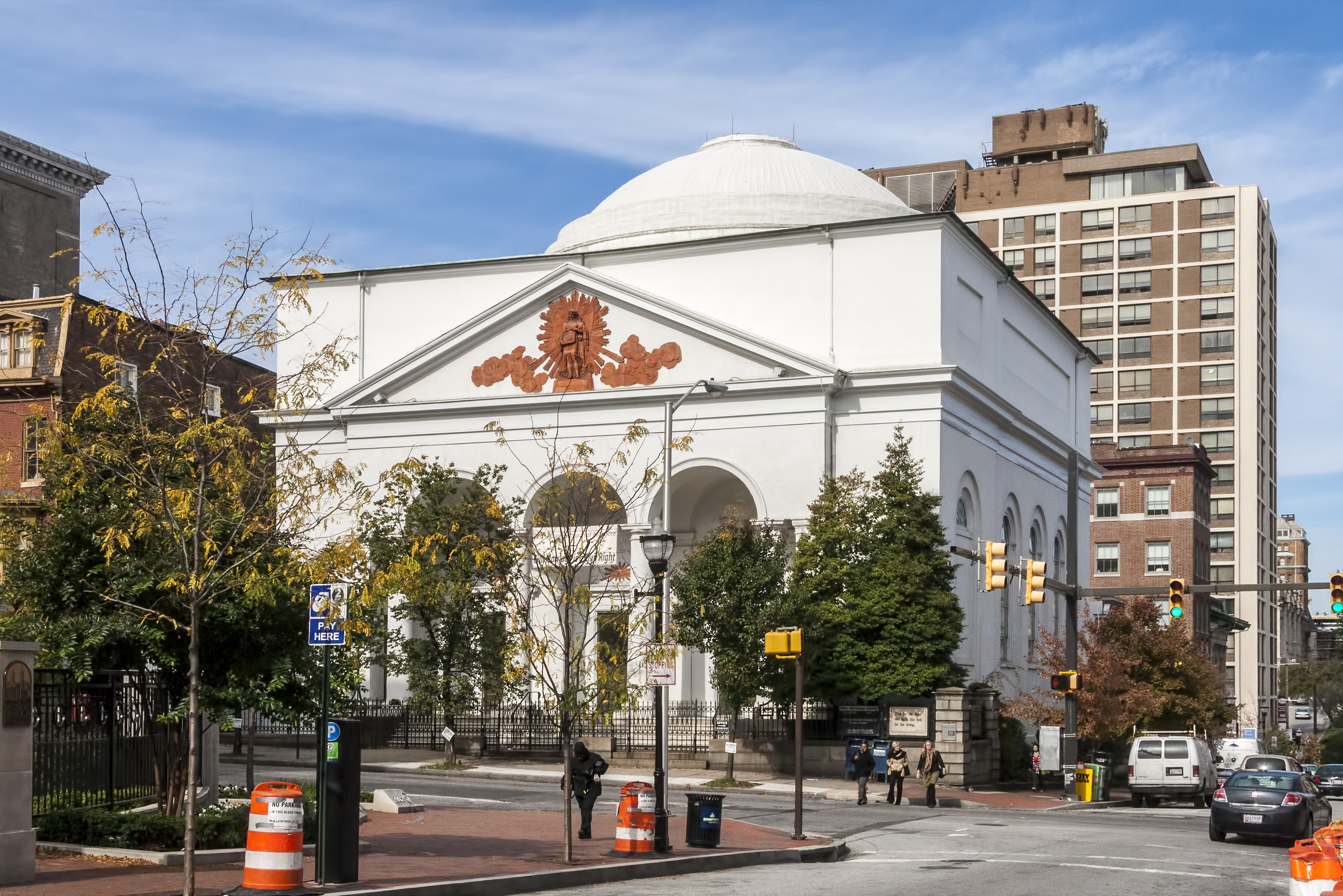
- First Unitarian Church, 2011

- Location within Baltimore Location within Maryland Location within the United States
- Location: 10 W. Franklin St, Mount Vernon, Baltimore, Maryland
- Coordinates: 39°17′43.4″N 76°36′57″W
- Area: 0.4 acres (0.16 ha)
- Built: 1817
- Architect: J. Maximilian M. Godefroy
- Architectural style: Neoclassical
- NRHP reference No.: 72001495

Significant dates
- Added to NRHP: February 11, 1972
- Designated NHL: February 20, 1972
- Designated BCL: 1971

The First Unitarian Church is a historic church and congregation at 12 West Franklin Street in the Mount Vernon neighborhood of Baltimore, Maryland, United States. Dedicated in 1818, it was the first building erected for Unitarians in the US. The church is a domed cube with a stucco exterior. The church, originally called the "First Independent Church of Baltimore", is the oldest building continuously used by a Unitarian congregation. The name was changed in 1935 to "The First Unitarian Church of Baltimore (Unitarian and Univeralist)" following the merger with the former Second Universalist Church at East Lanvale Street and Guilford Avenue in midtown Baltimore. The American Unitarian Association (founded 1825) and the Universalist Church of America (established 1793) representing the two strains of Unitarian Universalism beliefs and philosophies merged as a national denomination named the Unitarian Universalist Association in May 1961.

The church building was designated a National Historic Landmark in 1972.

== Description and history ==
The building was completed in 1817 on a plot of land in Howards Woods purchased for $20,000. It was designed by J. Maximilian M. Godefroy, a French émigré who also designed the St. Mary's Seminary Chapel on North Paca Street on the northwest edge of the City and the Battle Monument in the former Courthouse Square on North Calvert Street between East Lexington and Fayette Streets commemorating the Battle of Baltimore of September 1814 at North Point and the bombardment of Fort McHenry in the War of 1812, and assisted the famed British-American architect Benjamin Henry Latrobe in designing the Merchants' Exchange Building at South Gay Street, between Second (now Water) and East Lombard Streets, the then-largest building n America, an H-shaped, low domed on a drum Greco-Roman structure with a large rotunda beneath and a second-story interior catwalk balcony around the atrium. In its several wings were several Federal offices: the U.S. Courthouse, Post Office, Customs House, a branch of the Bank of the United States and early City Hall offices for Baltimore, and various offices for lawyers/attorneys, brokers, insurance agents, candlers, and shipping companies, steamship lines, and various other maritime businesses.

Poor acoustics under the central dome led to an 1893 interior renovation, in which architect Joseph Evans Sperry added a barrel vault under the dome. The church features stained glass from the studio of Louis Comfort Tiffany. The pipe organ was donated by Enoch Pratt and is an 1893 Niemann instrument. This organ was played in recital during the Organ Historical Society Convention in July 2024. In the rear, on the north side along the West Hamilton Street alley is the Enoch Pratt Parish Hall, also housing church offices, constructed in 1879 of bricks salvaged from the townhouses torn down at West Mulberry at Cathedral Street for the first Central Building of parishioner Enoch Pratt's gift to the City of Baltimore, of a central library and four regional branches in 1882, constructed and opened 1886 (current building replaced it in 1931–33). The Parish Hall was renamed to commemorate his influence and guidance in the early years in 2008 and its interior is being restored to its Victorian appearance.

A relief in the building's pediment was executed by Antonio Cappellano, who had also executed the carvings on the Battle Monument. Deterioration caused it to be replaced with a replica in 1954.

The building is significant in the history of Unitarianism as the site of William Ellery Channing's Baltimore Sermon of May 5, 1819, which laid the foundation for the Unitarian denomination.

One block north of Benjamin Latrobe's Baltimore Cathedral, (now the Basilica of the Assumption of Mary and the first cathedral constructed for Roman Catholics in America), The First Unitarian Church is located in the Mount Vernon-Belvedere neighborhood north of downtown and was formerly part of "Howard's Woods" on the estate north of old Baltimore Town of Col. John Eager Howard, commander of the "Maryland Line" regiment of the Continental Army in the American Revolution where the Washington Monument and its four square parks were laid out in 1821, two blocks north. His mansion "Belvidere" located at the current intersection of North Calvert and East Chase Streets which was torn down in 1874 as the street was extended further north towards the city limits at Boundary Avenue (today's North Avenue and the community developed during the 1830s 40's and 50's by the sons of the colonel. The First Unitarian Church is listed on the "National Register of Historic Places" on February 11, 1972 and designated a "National Historic Landmark" a week later on February 20, 1972, which is maintained by the U.S. Department of the Interior and its National Park Service. It is included in the "Cathedral Hill Historic District" and the newly designated "Baltimore National Heritage Area".

== See also ==
- List of National Historic Landmarks in Maryland
- National Register of Historic Places listings in Central Baltimore
