= Building at 419 West Baltimore Street =

- U.S. National Register of Historic Places
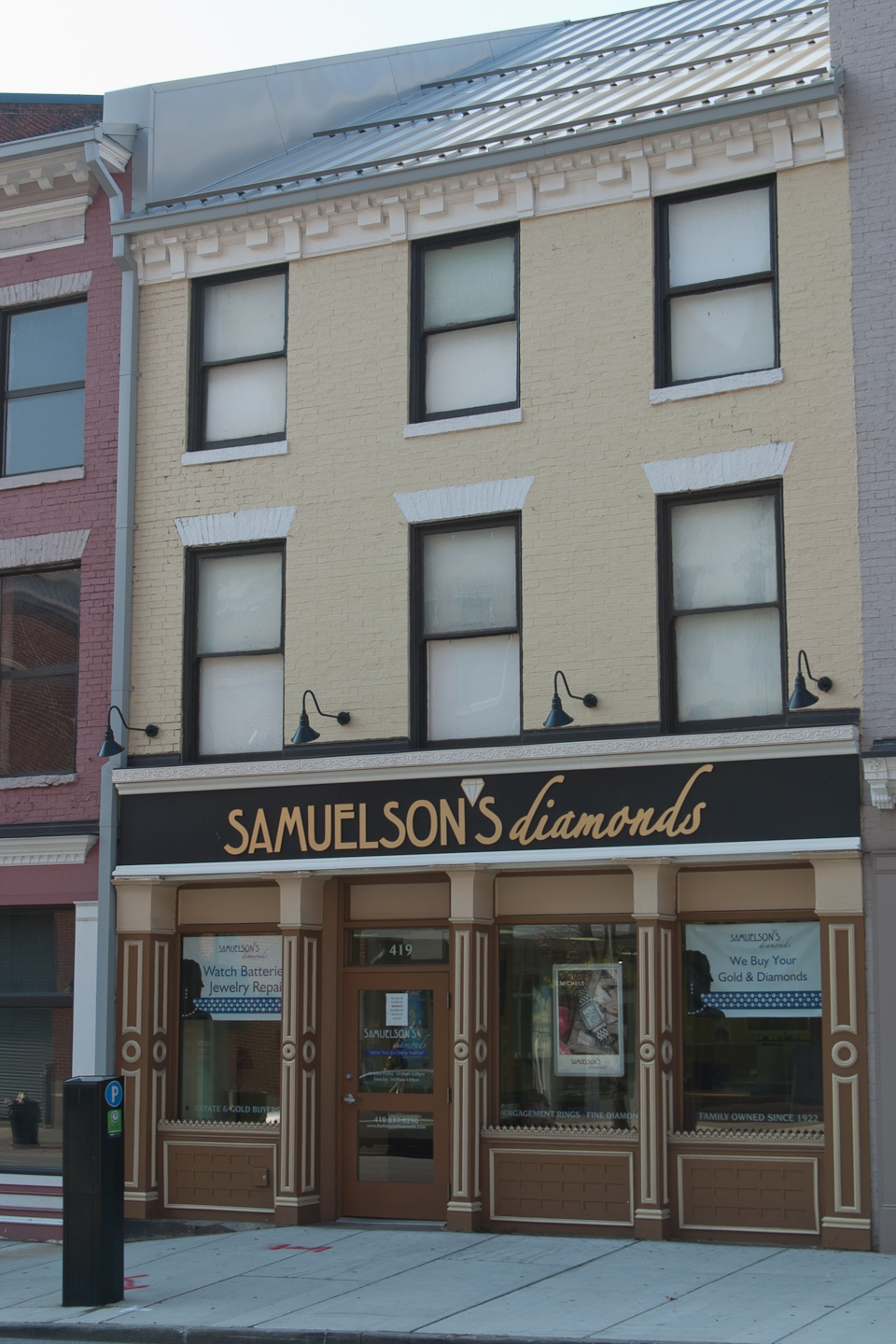
- 419 West Baltimore Street, August 2011

- Location within Baltimore Location within Maryland Location within the United States
- Location: 419 W. Baltimore St., Baltimore, Maryland
- Coordinates: 39°17′21″N 76°37′18.6″W
- Area: less than one acre
- Architectural style: Federal, Italianate
- MPS: Cast Iron Architecture of Baltimore MPS
- NRHP reference No.: 94001171
- Added to NRHP: September 30, 1994

Building at 419 West Baltimore Street, also known as Harry Guss Inc., is a historic retail and wholesale building located at Baltimore, Maryland, United States. It is a three-story gable-roofed Flemish bond brick Federal-style building built about 1840. Around 1875, a four-bay cast-iron storefront was added at street level. It was used in the garment manufacturing and sales industries.

Building at 419 West Baltimore Street was listed on the National Register of Historic Places in 1994.
