= Rieman Block =

Historic building in Maryland, USA

- U.S. National Register of Historic Places
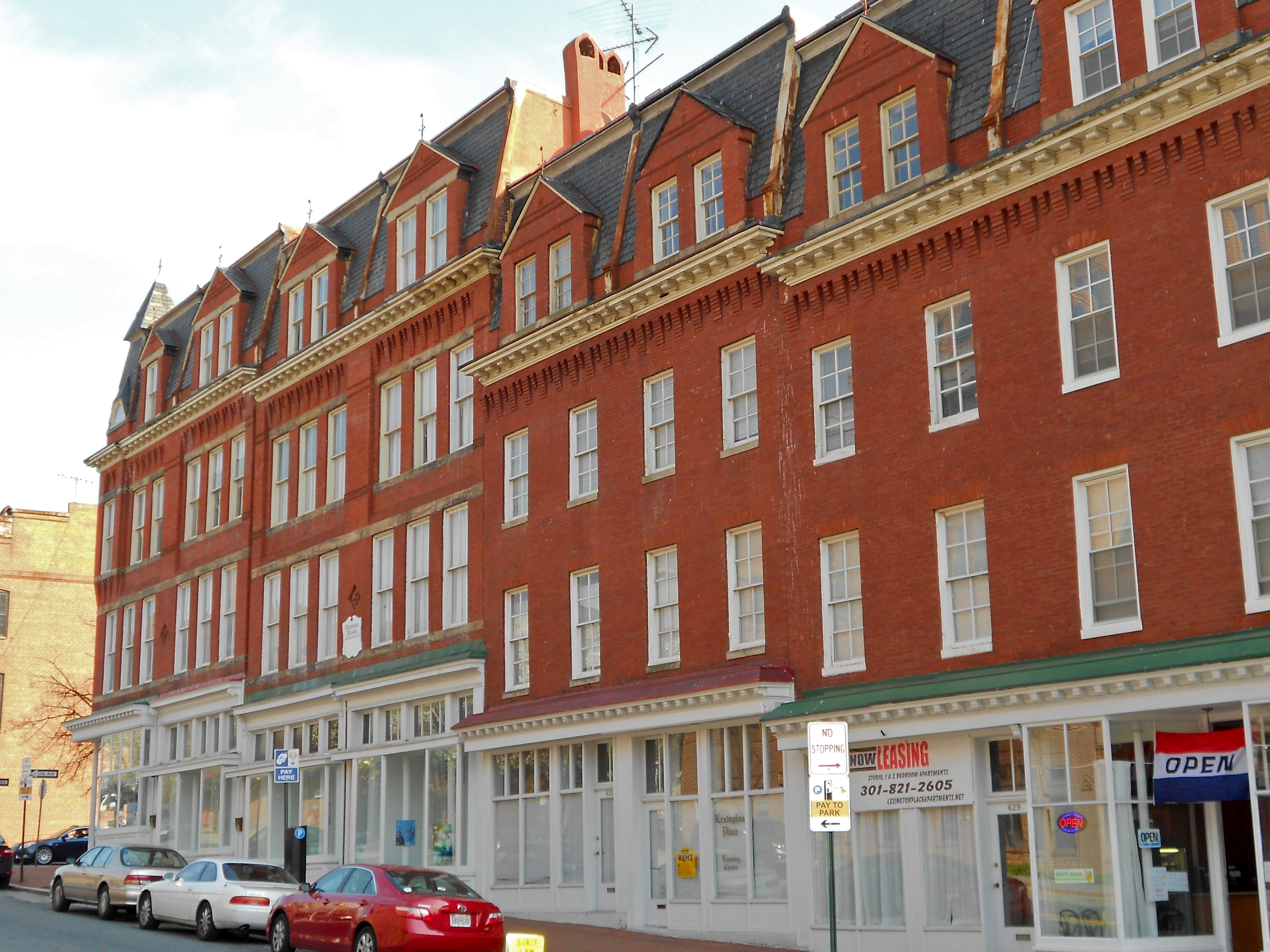
- Reiman Block, March 2012

- Location within Baltimore Location within Maryland Location within the United States
- Location: 617-631 W. Lexington St., Baltimore, Maryland
- Coordinates: 39°17′28″N 76°37′31″W
- Area: 0.2 acres (0.081 ha)
- Built: 1880
- Architectural style: Queen Anne
- NRHP reference No.: 84001350
- Added to NRHP: June 7, 1984

Rieman Block is a historic commercial building located at Baltimore, Maryland, United States. It is a Queen Anne-style terraced brick commercial and residential block of three stories plus a mansard roof in height, built about 1880. The shop fronts date from the late 19th and early 20th centuries. It is named for Joseph Rieman (1822-1898), a real estate developer and member of the boards of several corporations.

Rieman Block was listed on the National Register of Historic Places in 1984.
