= Gandy Belting Company Building =

Historic building in Maryland, USA

- U.S. National Register of Historic Places
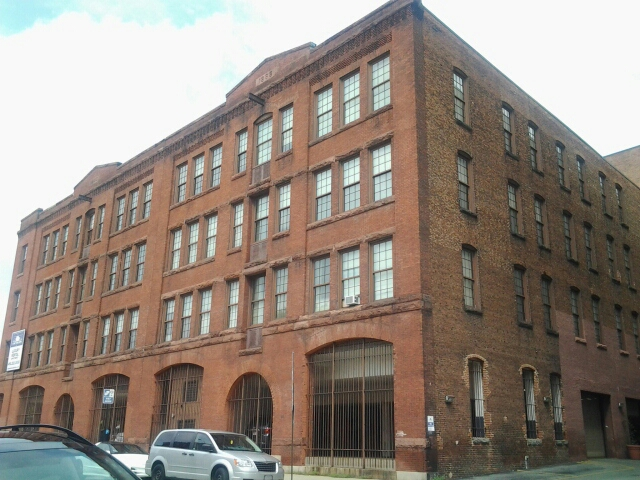
- Gandy Belting Company Building 2012

- Location within Baltimore Location within Maryland Location within the United States
- Location: 726-734 W. Pratt St., Baltimore, Maryland
- Coordinates: 39°17′11″N 76°37′39″W
- Area: less than one acre
- Built: 1888
- NRHP reference No.: 84000085
- Added to NRHP: October 25, 1984

Gandy Belting Company Building is a historic loft building located at Baltimore, Maryland, United States. It is a brick masonry bearing-wall structure built in five sections. The sections built in 1888, 1890, and 1908 are four stories in height. The remaining two sections, built in 1908-1911 and 1911 respectively, are five stories in height. The Gandy Belting Company, (1888-1931) manufacturer of machinery belting.

Gandy Belting Company Building was listed on the National Register of Historic Places in 1984.
