= George Knipp & Brother Building =

Historic building in Maryland, USA

- U.S. National Register of Historic Places
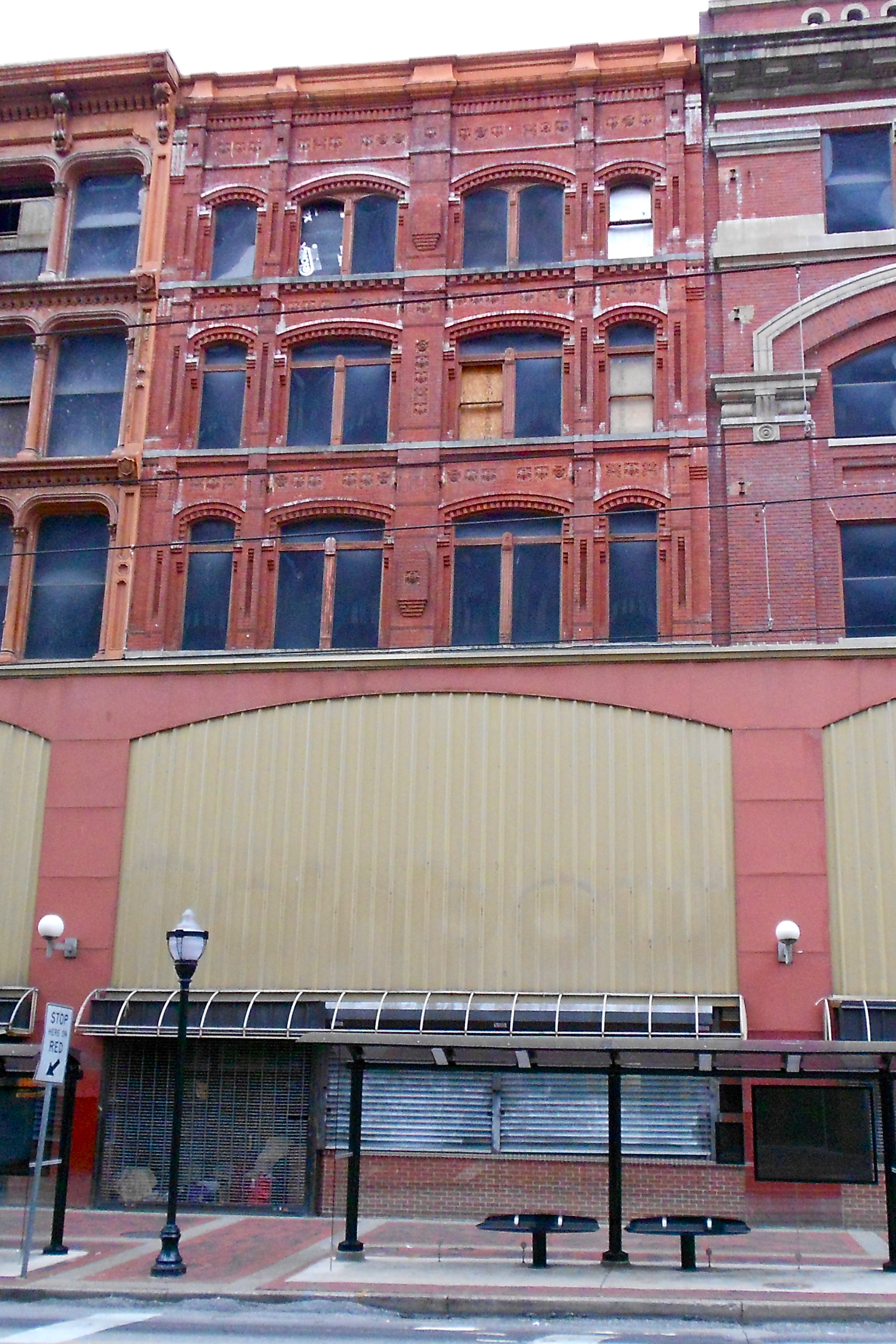
- George Knipp & Brother Building, March 2012

- Location within Baltimore Location within Maryland Location within the United States
- Location: 121 N. Howard St., Baltimore, Maryland
- Coordinates: 39°17′28.3″N 76°37′9.6″W
- Area: less than one acre
- Built: 1875
- Architectural style: Italianate
- MPS: Cast Iron Architecture of Baltimore MPS
- NRHP reference No.: 94001394
- Added to NRHP: December 1, 1994

George Knipp & Brother Building was a historic retail building located at Baltimore, Maryland, United States. It is a five-story brick commercial structure with a four-bay cast-iron façade, constructed about 1875. It features large window openings flanked by Corinthian columns. It was originally the location of John Knipps’ furniture business and his brother George Knipp's enterprise in gas fixtures and plumbing supplies. It was later occupied by a furniture and carpet firm and later a J.G. McCrory Co. store.

George Knipp & Brother Building was listed on the National Register of Historic Places in 1994.

In 2025, the building, along with both its neighbors, was severely damaged by a fire and subsequently demolished.
