= Baltimore Federal Savings & Loan Association =

- U.S. National Register of Historic Places
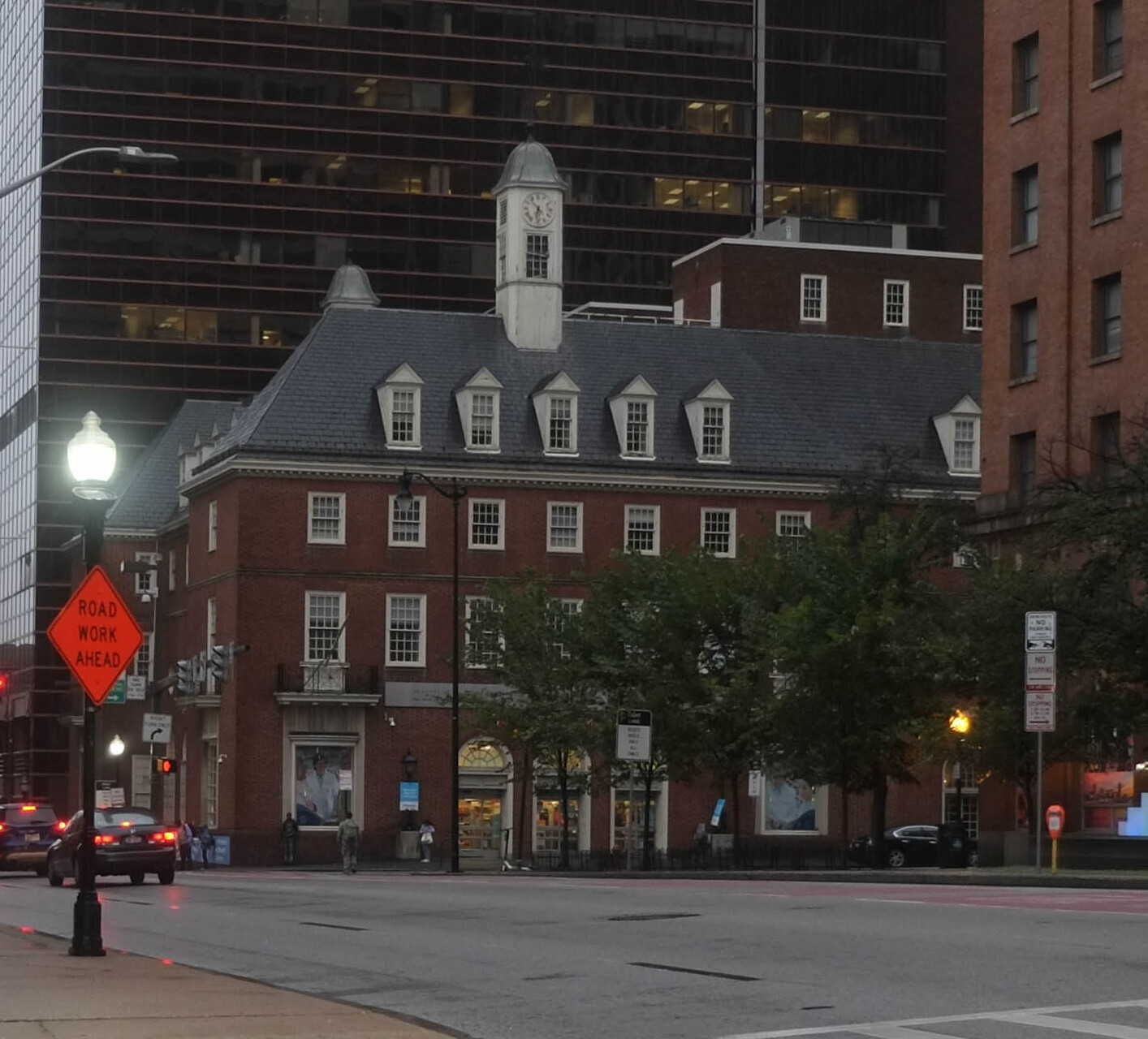
- The former Baltimore Federal Savings & Loan Association at Fayette and St. Paul streets in downtown Baltimore

- Location within Baltimore Location within Maryland Location within the United States
- Location: 19-25 East Fayette St. Baltimore, Maryland
- Coordinates: 39°17′25″N 76°36′51″W
- Area: less than one acre
- Built: 1950-1958
- Built by: John McShaine, Inc.
- Architect: Hall, Border, and Donaldson
- Architectural style: Colonial Revival
- NRHP reference No.: 100003084
- Added to NRHP: November 22, 2022

Baltimore Federal Savings & Loan Association is a historic bank building located at Baltimore, Maryland, United States. It was built in 1950, and is a five-story, Colonial Revival-style steel frame building sheathed in brick. A five-story addition, with a sixth floor penthouse was constructed in 1958. After the bank closed, the first floor was renovated to house a drug store.

It was listed on the National Register of Historic Places in 2022.
