= Building at 423 West Baltimore Street =

Historic building in Maryland, USA

- U.S. National Register of Historic Places
- Location within Baltimore Location within Maryland Location within the United States
- Location: 423 W. Baltimore St., Baltimore, Maryland
- Coordinates: 39°17′21″N 76°37′19.2″W
- Area: less than one acre
- Built: 1893
- Built by: Thomas L. Jones
- Architect: Louis J Ginter
- Architectural style: Queen Anne
- Demolished: c. 2000
- MPS: Cast Iron Architecture of Baltimore MPS
- NRHP reference No.: 94001607
- Added to NRHP: February 10, 1995

Building at 423 West Baltimore Street was a historic retail and wholesale building located in Baltimore, Maryland, United States. It was a five-story loft structure of the Queen Anne style. It was built in 1893, as the result of extensive alteration of an existing three-story brick warehouse. The storefront retained its important cast-iron elements, and the upper floors were essentially unchanged.

Building at 423 West Baltimore Street was listed on the National Register of Historic Places in 1995.

The building was severely damaged in a fire in January 2000.
