= Swiss Steam Laundry Building =

Historic building in Maryland, USA

- U.S. National Register of Historic Places
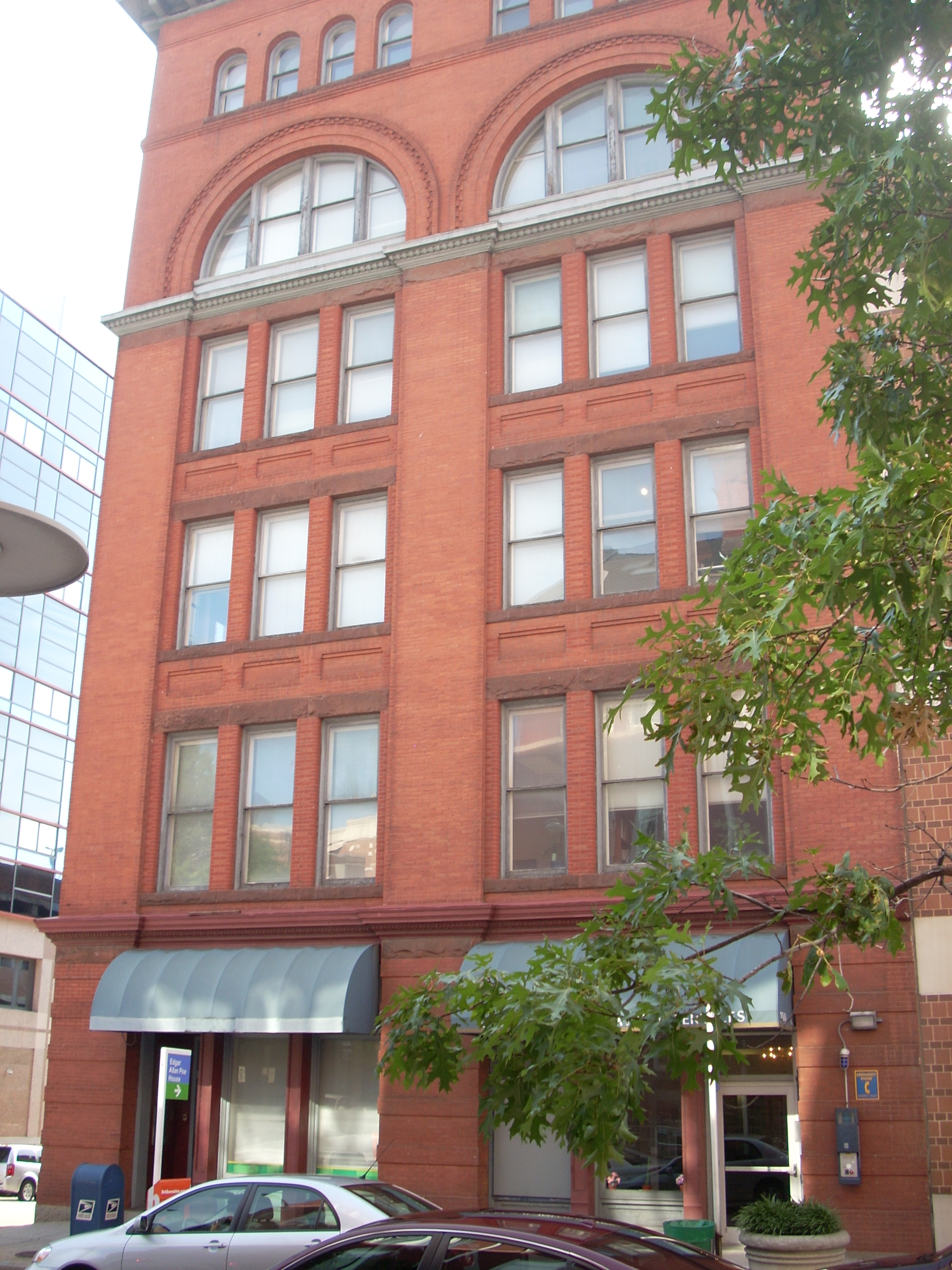
- Swiss Steam Laundry Building in 2011

- Location within Baltimore Location within Maryland Location within the United States
- Location: 100--102 N. Greene St., Baltimore, Maryland
- Coordinates: 39°17′25.6″N 76°37′26.3″W
- Area: less than one acre
- Architectural style: Romanesque
- NRHP reference No.: 85001271
- Added to NRHP: June 20, 1985

Swiss Steam Laundry Building, also known as the Swiss Building, is a historic loft building located in Baltimore, Maryland, United States. It is a Romanesque Revival-style six-story structure. The façade is dominated by two five-story arched bays each consisting of tripartite fenestration at the corners and a cast iron storefront with an ornamental scroll and egg-and-dart molding at the cornice. The interior of the building features iron columns and wood flooring. The first two floors are 20 feet high. The third and fourth floors are 16 feet high, while the uppermost floors are 10 feet high. It was built in 1895 as a manufacturers’ laundry.

Swiss Steam Laundry Building was listed on the National Register of Historic Places in 1985.
