= Mount Vernon, Baltimore =

Mount Vernon Midtown
- Neighborhood
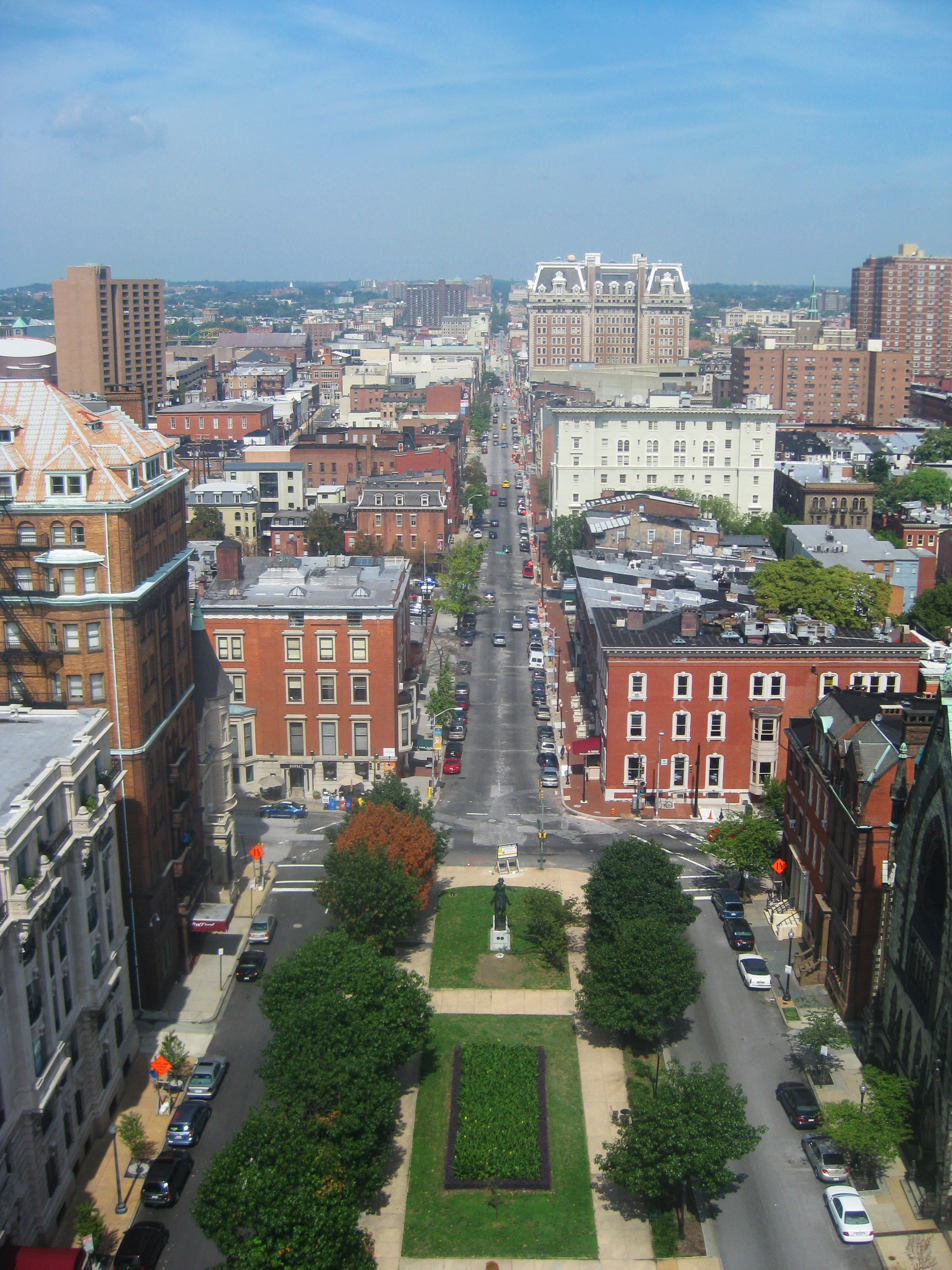
- Northward view from the Washington Monument
- Interactive map of Mount Vernon
- Coordinates: 39°17.9′N 76°37′W
- Country: United States
- State: Maryland
- City: Baltimore
- Founder: John Eager Howard
- Named for: Mount Vernon Estate
- Time zone: UTC-5 (Eastern)
  - Summer (DST): EDT
- ZIP code: 21201, 21202
- Area code: 410, 443, and 667
- Website: www.mvba.org
- Mount Vernon Place Historic District
- U.S. National Register of Historic Places
- U.S. National Historic Landmark District
- Baltimore City Landmark
- Architect: Robert Mills and others
- NRHP reference No.: 71001037

Significant dates
- Added to NRHP: November 11, 1971
- Designated NHLD: November 11, 1971
- Designated BCL: 1975

Mount Vernon is a neighborhood of Baltimore, Maryland, located immediately north of the city's downtown. It is named for George Washington's Mount Vernon estate in Virginia, as the site of the city's Washington Monument.

== Overview ==
The Baltimore City Planning Commission defines the neighborhood as being bound by Eager Street to the north, the Jones Falls Expressway to the east, Franklin Street to the south, and Eutaw Street to the west. The Mid-Town Belvedere neighborhood, named for the Belvedere estate of John Eager Howard, lies immediately to the north, and the two are sometimes considered to be one neighborhood.

The Light RailLink line runs along Howard Street on the western side of Mount Vernon, and the Metro Subway runs beneath Eutaw Street. Penn Station, served by Amtrak and MARC commuter rail, is located north of Mid-Town Belvedere.

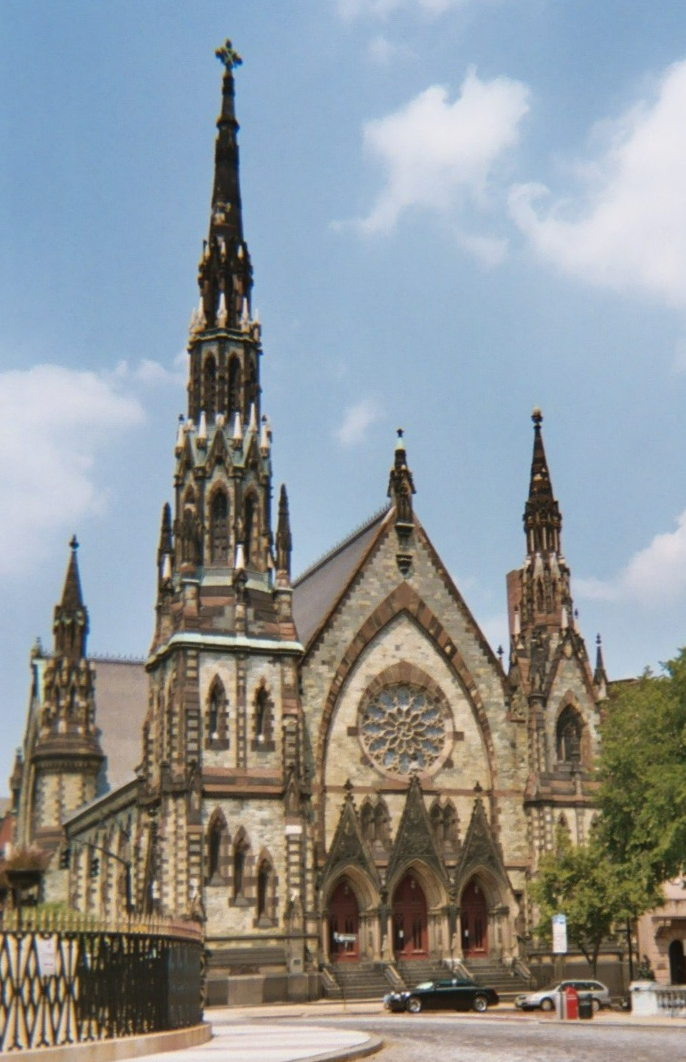
Mt Vernon Place UMC

Although mainly residential, Mount Vernon-Belvedere is home to a mix of institutions, including the Peabody Conservatory of the Johns Hopkins University, Walters Art Museum, University of Baltimore, Maryland Center for History and Culture, Maryland Institute College of Art, Joseph Meyerhoff Symphony Hall, Baltimore School for the Arts, Lyric Opera House, Center Stage, the Central Branch of the Enoch Pratt Free Library, Spotlighters Theatre, the Eubie Blake National Jazz Institute, and formerly the Peabody Bookshop and Beer Stube.

During the 1970s, Mount Vernon became Baltimore's main gay village. The Gay and Lesbian Community Center of Baltimore, now known as the Pride Center of Maryland, was established in Mount Vernon in 1977 but has since moved out of the neighborhood. After the permanent closure of Club Hippo in 2015 and Grand Central in 2020, only a couple of gay-focused bars remain in the neighborhood.

== Architectural history ==
The centerpiece of the Mount Vernon neighborhood, the cruciform arrangement of parks surrounding the Washington Monument, represents one of the nation's first examples of city planning for the express purpose of highlighting a monument. The Washington Monument was completed in 1829 to a design by Robert Mills, and in 1831 the Howard family was granted permission to lay out the surrounding parks which eventually were lined by stately homes. The parks, which have survived almost intact, are considered to be the finest existing urban landscapes by the Beaux-Arts architectural firm of Carrère and Hastings, who also designed the New York Public Library, portions of the U.S. Capitol in Washington, D.C., and the residence that houses the Frick Collection.

Elsewhere in the neighborhood are many older apartment buildings and three and four-story rowhouses. The Belvedere Hotel, opened in 1903, was converted to condominiums in 1991.

The Mount Vernon Place United Methodist Church lies northeast of the Washington Monument. Conceived as a cathedral of Methodism, it was built on the site of the Charles Howard mansion, the house in which Francis Scott Key died. In 2021, the church's owners sought planning permission to subdivide the building, separating the church from the adjacent Asbury House. The southeast corner from the monument is occupied entirely by the Peabody Institute, and the southwest corner includes three buildings forming part of the Walters Art Museum.

The former Stafford Hotel on Washington Place, built in 1894, now serves as an apartment building primarily housing Peabody Institute students.

The old Mount Vernon Hotel at 702 Cathedral Street, built in 1847, was the mansion home of U.S. Congressman William Julian Albert where he entertained Abraham Lincoln. It was converted into a hotel in 1967, and was where Oscar Wilde stayed as part of his 1882 lecture tour of the United States.

The Marburg Mansion at 14 West Mount Vernon Place was the home of diplomat and peace advocate Theodore Marburg, who entertained Presidents William Howard Taft and Woodrow Wilson there; it is said that Wilson, working with Marburg, drafted the first covenant of the League of Nations at the house.

The Mount Vernon Place Historic District, surrounding the Washington Monument, was listed on the National Register of Historic Places and further designated as a National Historic Landmark District on November 11, 1971.

Selected parcels with the National Historic Landmark District have been designated Baltimore City Landmarks, including:

- Washington Monument and Mount Vernon Place (defined as the city square of the monument and the cruciform-shaped area of parks radiating north, south, east and west)
- Peabody Institute, 1-21 E. Mount Vernon Place
- Thomas-Jencks-Gladding House, 1 W. Mount Vernon Place
- George Howard House, 8 E. Madison Street

The National Historic Landmark District also includes:

- Mount Vernon Place United Methodist Church and Asbury House, individually NRHP-listed
- The Stafford Apartments

The Mount Vernon neighborhood also includes:

- First Unitarian Church, NRHP-listed, NHL, BCL

The entire Mount Vernon neighborhood is included within the Baltimore National Heritage Area, which was established in 2009.

== Demographics ==
As of the census of 2000, there were 4,520 people living in the neighborhood. The racial makeup of Mount Vernon was 55.3% White, 33.4% African American, 0.2% Native American, 7.4% Asian, 1.2% from other races, and 2.3% from two or more races. Hispanic or Latino of any race were 3.1% of the population.

60.4% of the population were employed, 3.5% were unemployed, and 36.0% were not in the labor force, largely due to the large student population. The median household income was $21,225. About 15.2% of families and 26.9% of the population were below the poverty line.

5.6% of occupied housing units were owner-occupied. 10.2% of housing units were vacant.

== Education ==
The Baltimore School for the Arts is located on Cathedral Street in Mount Vernon.

In 2010, the Baltimore Leadership School for Young Women (BLSYW), a charter secondary school for girls, moved into the former headquarters of the Young Women's Christian Association (YWCA) in Mount Vernon, becoming its first new public school in three decades.

== See also ==
- Culture of Baltimore
- List of National Historic Landmarks in Maryland
- National Register of Historic Places listings in Central Baltimore
- Washington Monument (Baltimore)
