= Baltimore National Heritage Area =

Federally designated area of Baltimore, Maryland, US

- Location within Baltimore Location within Maryland Location within the United States
- Location: Baltimore, Maryland, United States
- Coordinates: 39.29°N 76.63°W
- Established: March 30, 2009
- Governing body: Baltimore Heritage Area Association

Baltimore National Heritage Area is a federally designated National Heritage Area encompassing portions of Baltimore, Maryland, in the United States. It is one of the thirteen Maryland heritage area sites administered by the Maryland Historical Trust through the Maryland Heritage Areas Program.

The designated area includes the central portion of the city, waterfront, inner neighborhoods and portions of the city's park system. The district includes Fort McHenry and the Inner Harbor, as well as portions of the Charles Street, Falls Road, National Historic Seaport and Star Spangled Banner Maryland Scenic Byways. The Baltimore National Heritage Area was established on March 30, 2009, by the Omnibus Public Land Management Act of 2009 (Pub. L. 111–11 (text) (PDF)§7002). The designation recognizes the area's unique historic and cultural character, and is intended to stimulate economic development, tourism and historic preservation.

Neighborhoods in the NHA include Little Italy, Fell's Point, Canton, Bolton Hill, Seton Hill, Mount Vernon, Charles Village, Union Square, Locust Point and Federal Hill. City parks within the NHA include Druid Hill Park, Gwynns Falls Leakin Park, Carroll Park and Patterson Park.
