= St. Peter the Apostle Church =

Historic church in Maryland, United States

- St. Peter the Apostle Church and Buildings
- U.S. National Register of Historic Places
- Baltimore City Landmark
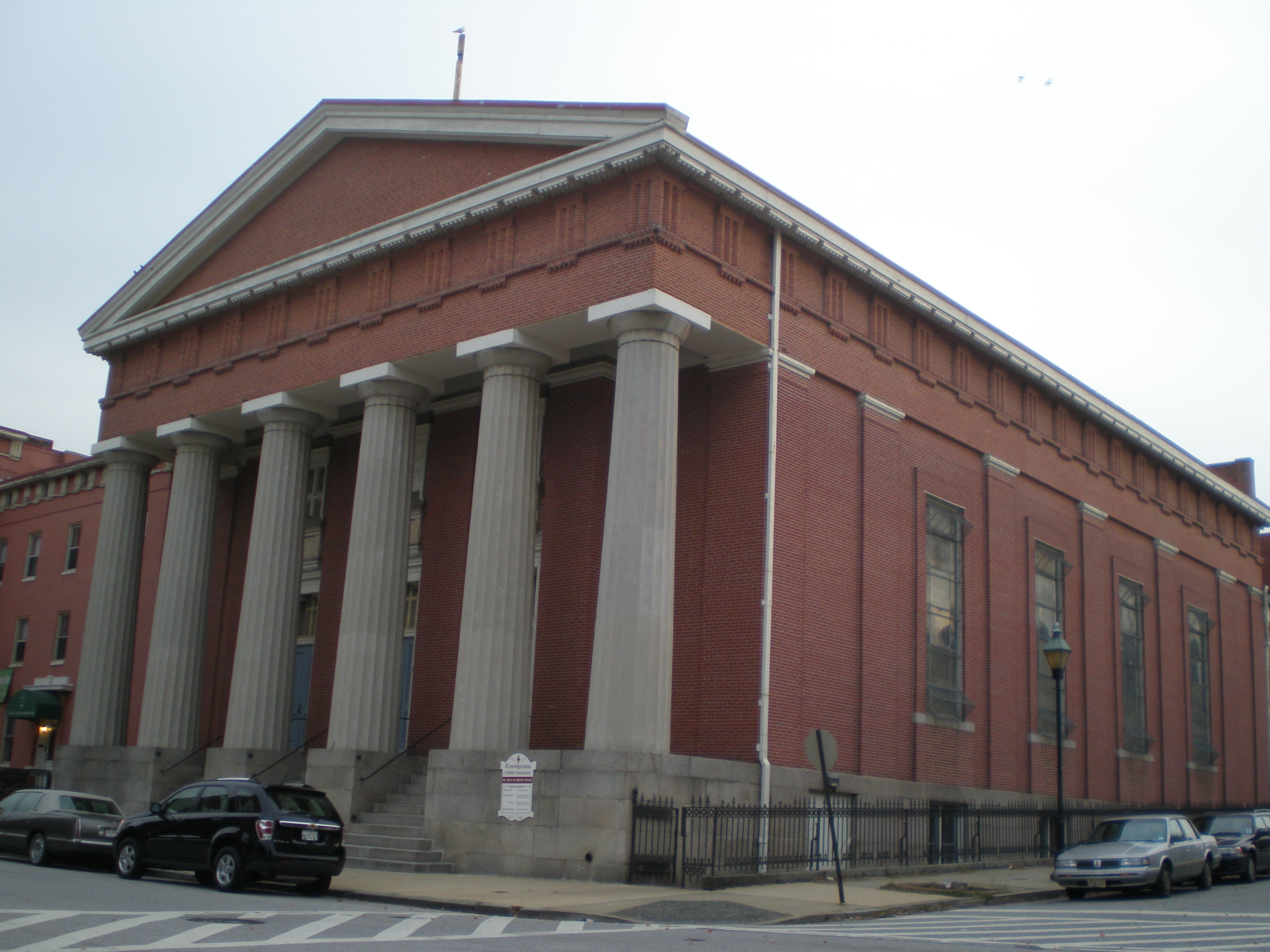
- St. Peter the Apostle Church, Baltimore, MD
- Interactive map of St. Peter the Apostle Church and Buildings
- Location: 11 and 13 S. Poppleton St. and 848 Hollins St., Baltimore, Maryland
- Coordinates: 39°17′17″N 76°37′56″W
- Area: 0.5 acres (0.20 ha)
- Built: 1843
- Architect: Long, Robert Cary, Jr.; Et al.
- Architectural style: Greek Revival
- NRHP reference No.: 76002184

Significant dates
- Added to NRHP: October 14, 1976
- Designated BCL: 2011

St. Peter the Apostle Church was a Roman Catholic church located within the Archdiocese of Baltimore in Baltimore, Maryland. Constructed at the northwest corner of Hollins and South Poppleton Streets (848 Hollins) and (11-13 South Poppleton), it was often referred to as "The Mother Church of West Baltimore."

== Description ==
The church was built in 1842 to minister to the growing Irish population of old West Baltimore, who had immigrated to the city in vast numbers to work for the B&O Railroad.

Robert Cary Long, Jr., a prominent local "ecumenical architect," (both secular and religious) and son of a similarly famous accomplished father of the same name designed the church in the Greek revival style with imposing granite pillars gracing the facade of the building. Its appearance is similar to the now landmark Lloyd Street Synagogue off East Baltimore Street, also designed by Long, a year later for the Baltimore Hebrew Congregation in the Jonestown/Old Town neighborhood of East Baltimore, across the Jones Falls. Among others, Long also designed the third church for Old St. Paul's (1814–1817) which burned in 1854. and the Franklin Street Presbyterian Church (1847) at Cathedral and West Franklin Streets The design was based on Athens' Temple of Hephaestus. The interior of the church features a large, open nave furnished with wooden pews. Behind the altar stood in an apse adorned with white columns, and punctuated with an imposing white marble tabernacle. It contained statues of angels and the Holy Family, and was topped with a large statue of Saint Peter. The inscription above the tabernacle read, "Tu Es Petrus," a reference to the biblical passage, "You are Peter, and on this rock I will build my Church" (Matt. 16:18). The church also had a historic tracker organ designed by Henry Niemann. The organ was removed to storage when the building was sold to Carter Memorial Church of God in Christ in 2012.

The name of the church was transferred to here upon the closing of the colonial red-brick church, rectory, school and small surrounding cemetery and its subsequent razing in 1841 of the original St. Peter's Roman Catholic Church. The older parish had been founded in 1770 as the first "Roman Catholic Congregation of Baltimore Town" with new immigrants of Acadians, who were French Canadians expelled recently from their colony of Acadia, now the British-occupied province of Nova Scotia after the losses by France in North America from the French and Indian War (known in Europe as the Seven Years' War, 1756–1763) and settled along the southwestern shores of "The Basin" (now Inner Harbor) of the Patapsco River which became known as "Frenchtown," beyond the intersection of Forest (South Charles) and King George (now West Lombard) Streets. With the joining of some additional Irish settlers, the Roman Catholic population of the new Baltimore Town was growing with the first Mass being said by the Rev. John Ashton from Doughoregan Manor from the Carroll's country estate in the late 1760s to 1770 and came to the town about once a month. The congregation seldom exceeded twenty worshippers and seldom exceeded forty.

The original St. Peter's building was the "Pro-Cathedral" of the Diocese from 1791 to 1821 and the first church used as Roman Catholic Cathedral in the United States. Father John Carroll was named the first bishop for the United States in 1789, installed the following year as Ordinary of the new Diocese of Baltimore, "The Premier See." His seat was at old St. Peter's.

The older church was located at the northwestern corner of Forest Street (later North Charles) and XXX Lane (later West Saratoga Street), opposite the Old St. Paul's Anglican Parish on the southeastern corner situated above the rugged cliffs to the east overlooking the Jones Falls loop to the northeast around "Steiger's Meadow", below the new Baltimore County and Town Courthouse (just constructed in the new Courthouse Square at the north edge of the town at Calvert Street between New Church Street (now East Lexington Street) and Fish Lane (now East Fayette Street) a year after when the county seat was re-located here from Old Joppa in 1767. The new path of St. Paul's Lane (later Street/Place) ran north and south just below the heights where the two churches were located.

Founded in 1692 as one of the Original Thirty parishes in the Province/Colony of Maryland for the Church of England (Anglican), the Parish Church for the County had been moved shortly after the founding of the new larger town in 1729 on The Basin's headwaters. Its first location was near Colgate Creek on the Patapsco Neck peninsula in southeastern Baltimore County between the Patapsco and the Back River. St. Paul's built the first brick building in town for its worship and took many years to complete until 1739. So it seems an unusual situation of having Catholics and Anglicans facing across from each other for weekly services only forty years after the beginnings of Baltimore and this continued for the next seventy years of its history.

In 1821 the bishop's chair was transferred to the new Cathedral. The new cathedral was designed by Benjamin Latrobe and located a block further north on the newly named Cathedral Street and intersecting West Franklin and Mulberry Streets. No longer a pro-cathedral, Old St. Peter's continued as the downtown community's parish for another twenty years. Gradually, the members of the parish began moving northwestward and to the west for other residential areas being constructed, as the center became increasingly filled with stores, shops and manufactories. By the early 1840s, the Archdiocese was ready to make a move with a new church building for an old name.

The new neighborhood in inner West Baltimore later acquired the name of ""Union Square" for the prominent small landscaped park in its center. That joined a series of other parks and squares such as Arlington and Franklin which dotted the residential landscape of the western side of the burgeoning city as grids of rowhouses were extended north and south as it grew westward. The New Church itself along South Poppleton and Hollins Streets was part of a complex of several buildings, including a church rectory, a convent, and a school.

Founded by Edward McColgan, who served for over thirty years. The new church had its cornerstone laid on May 23, 1843 by the Bishop of New York City, the Right Rev. John Hughes assisted by the Right Rev. Kendrick, Bishop of Philadelphia and was dedicated later by Archbishop Samuel Eccleston of Baltimore, and Bishops J. J. Chance, John Hughes and several others on September 22, 1844. Father McColgan was instrumental in having the Sisters of Mercy come to the church later in 1855 to teach at St. Peter School, a female academy adjoining the church and established a handsome residence at neighboring 12 South Poppleton Street. In addition to their educational duties, the Sisters also assisted the poor and sick of the community by opening the "House of Mercy for distressed women". Father McColgan became the superior of the order in Maryland, was responsible for establishing the first Catholic temperance society in the city in 1849, as he called a mass meeting of meat packers in the western city and encouraged them to "take the pledge" to abstain from intoxicating drinks which became the nucleus of the St. Peter's Society, the largest Catholic temperance society in Baltimore. Later in 1878, he was appointed vicar-general of the Archdiocese replacing the late Rev. Dubreal.

The limits of the parish grew so much in the early years by 1865 that a second church was established (St. Martin's at Fulton Avenue and West Fayette Street) and dedicated in 1867. St. Peter the Apostle was twice enlarged during its first forty years. In the summer of 1868, a thorough renovation was made with several improvements such as the addition of fifty-four pews, the building extended eastwardly, sanctuary rebuilt, gallery reconstructed, stained glass windows installed from Munich, Germany and the ceiling frescoed and ornamented. This phase was rededicated by Archbishop Martin Spalding, April 4, 1869. The dimensions were now 150 feet in length and 73 feet in width, finished in a Corinthian style of architecture although the exterior is with six Doric columns out front. Archbishop James Gibbons consecrated the building on May 1, 1879, assisted by Bishops Thomas A. Becker of Wilmington, Delaware and J. J. Kain of Wheeling, West Virginia.

Up to 1881, those who served as assistants at St. Peter's were the Rev. John Hickey, Rev. William D. Parsons, Rev. O'Tool, Rev. Lawrence McCauley, D.D., Rev. John S. Foley D.D., Rev. P. McCoy, Rev. Edmund Didier, Rev. Henry Reardon, and Rev. Gerard H. Nyssen. Assistant pastors were Rev. Owen Corrigan and again Gerard H. Nyssen.

== St. Peter's Cemetery ==
Father McColgan purchased more than twenty acres from the estate of John McClelland in 1850, and a cemetery was opened in September of 1851. Located at Moreland Avenue and Bentalou Street and consisting of twenty acres, the cemetery was referred to by parishioners as "Parishes Fear", officially known as St. Peter's Cemetery. Comprising mostly Irish-American Catholic immigrants and their children who settled in Baltimore in the 19th century, to work on the B&O, there are also some African-American graves. In total about 15,000 people are buried there. It stopped taking interments in 1969, and by the 1980s there was little money available for upkeep, the land became overgrown and unkempt. In the 1990s, the Jonah House peace-activist commune settled on the property and does some maintenance work in exchange. Leonce Rabillon (1814–1886), a French-born sculptor for wealthy patrons, is the only person still making regular payments for the upkeep of his grave.

== Gallery ==
Stained glass window 1:
Jesus Christ

Stained glass window 2

Stained glass window 3:
St. Paul

Stained glass window 4:
St. Mary

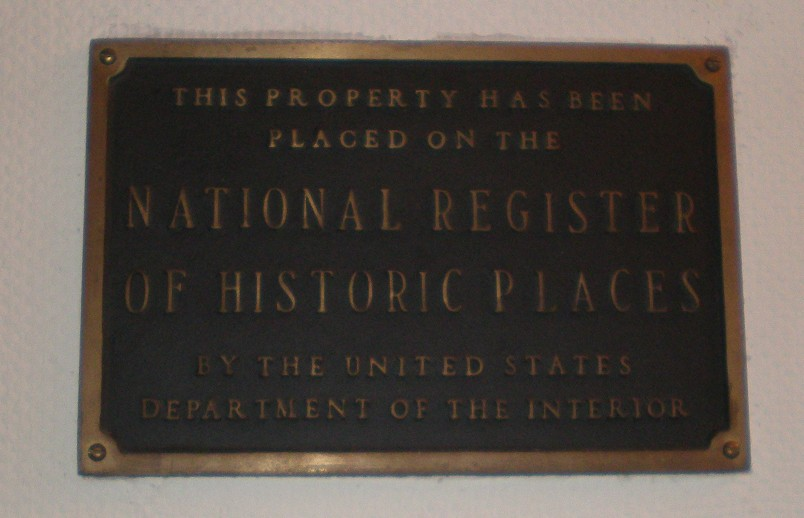
St. Peter the Apostle Church is on the National Register of Historic Places

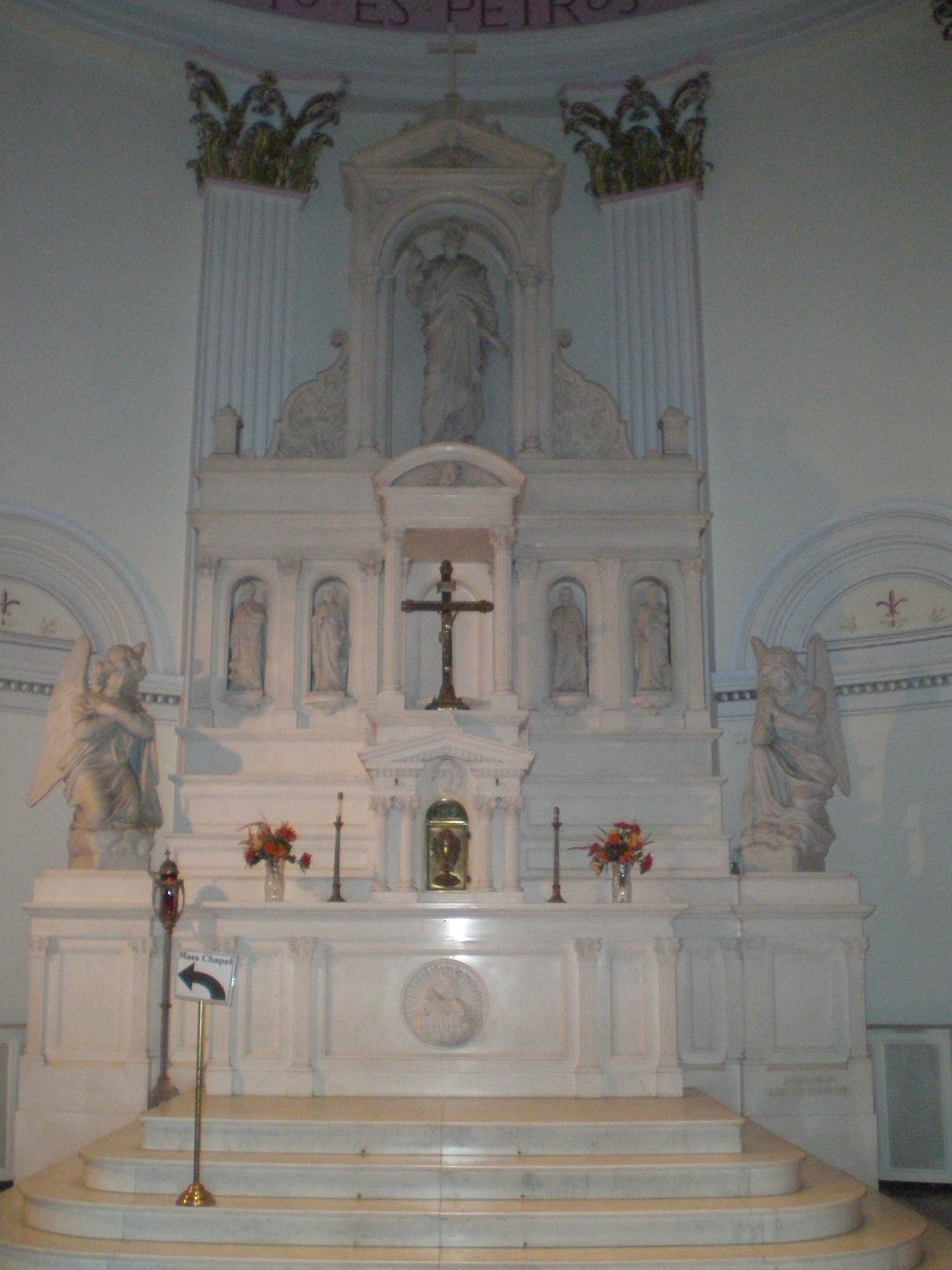
Tabernacle of St. Peter the Apostle Church

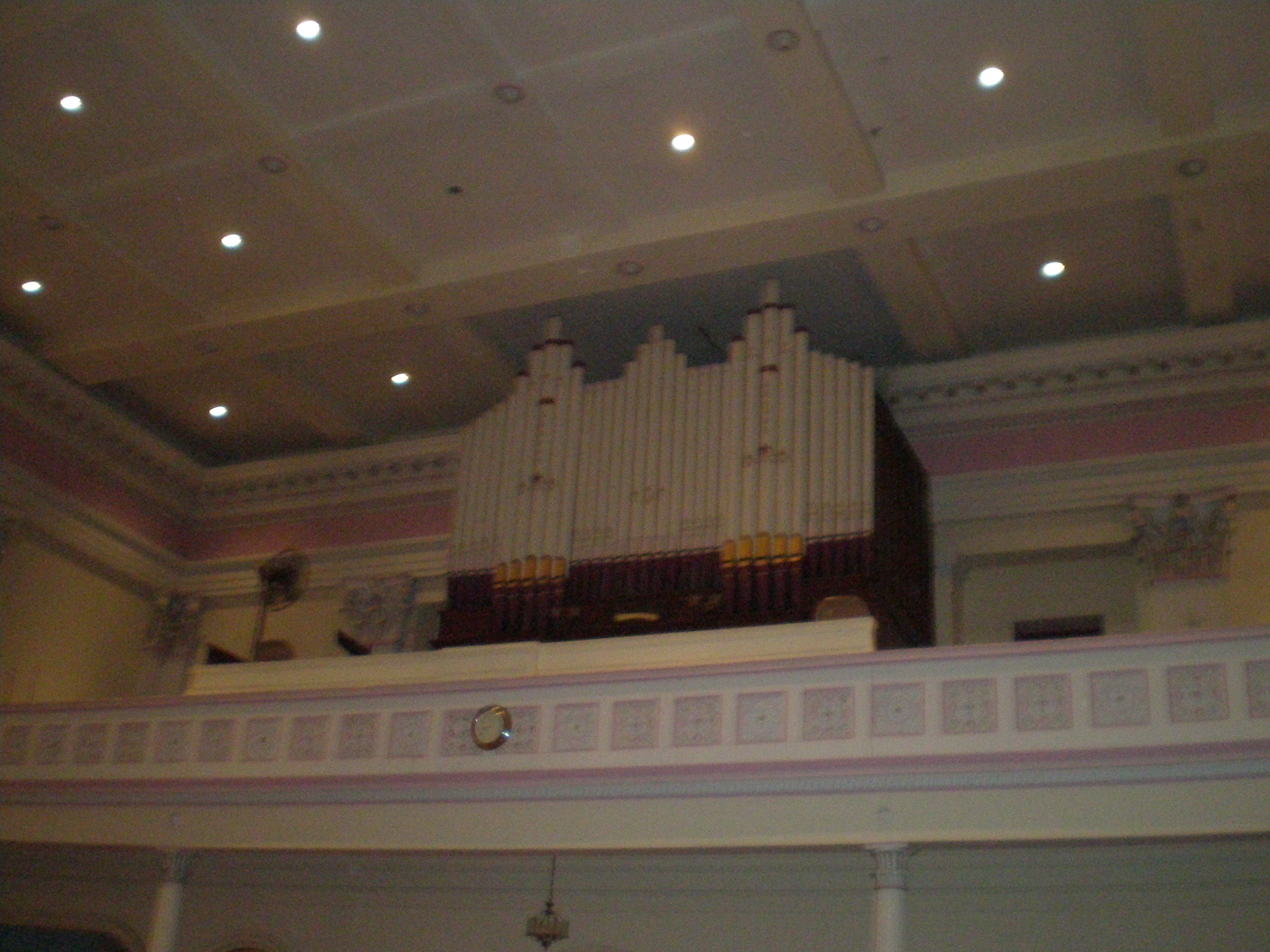
Tracker organ in the balcony of the church

== Renovation in 1967 ==
Another renovation, done in 1967, brought the church to the attention of the newly formed Baltimore City Commission on Historical and Architectural Preservation. This attention led to the church being placed on the National Register of Historic Places on October 14, 1976.

Throughout its history, the congregation of St. Peter the Apostle Church ministered to those in need, and was also active in community organization efforts. In 1965, pastor Thomas J. Donellan formed the Southwest Baltimore Citizens Planning Council, along with four other area churches, to bring identity and renewal to their Hollins Park neighborhood. At one time the former convent housed a Christian Life Center, which provided recreation and development programs.

In later years declining numbers of parishioners and priests limited the number of services that the church held, and the final regularly scheduled Mass was said at St. Peter on Saturday, January 26, 2008. Thereafter the church was only used for weddings, funerals and special occasions. The churches of St. Martin, St. Peter, and St. Jerome merged and formed a new parish known as the Transfiguration Catholic Community.

== Closing ==
St. Peter's Church was closed in 2008, after 165 years of service. The church was stripped of everything Catholic, and sold to the Carter Memorial Church of God in Christ in 2012. The angels on either side of the Tabernacle were removed and given to St. Ambrose Church. Statues and other relics were removed to other churches in the Archdiocese. The pipe organ, built by Baltimore builder Henry Niemann in 1890, has been placed in storage, pending its location to another church.
