= Jewish Museum of Maryland =

Museum in Baltimore, Maryland, US

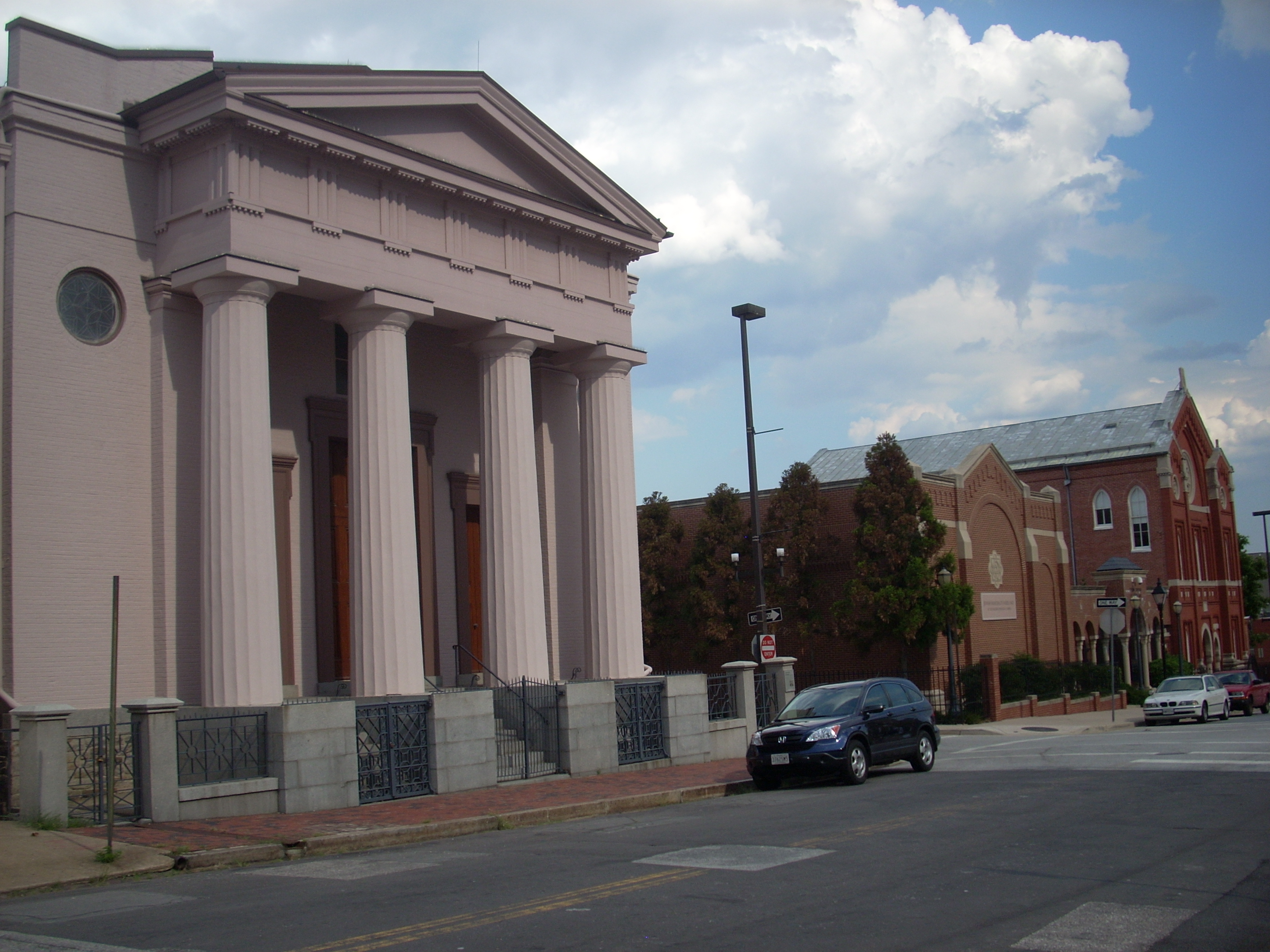
- Lloyd Street Synagogue (left), the museum (center) and B'nai Israel Synagogue (far right)

- Location within Baltimore Jewish Museum of Maryland (Maryland) Jewish Museum of Maryland (the United States)
- Established: 1960
- Location: Baltimore, Maryland, United States
- Coordinates: 39°17′25″N 76°36′04″W
- Public transit access: Shot Tower
- Website: jewishmuseummd.org

The Jewish Museum of Maryland is located in the Jonestown neighborhood of Baltimore, Maryland, United States. The museum tells the story of the American Jewish experience in the city of Baltimore and throughout the US state of Maryland.

== Description ==
The museum is one of the country's leading centers for exhibits on Jewish history and culture. The museum has two galleries that host changing exhibits of local and national interest. The museum's collections include works of art, historical photographs, clothing, Jewish ceremonial art, rare books, everyday objects, documents, oral histories, and memorabilia. The museum was founded in 1960.

The museum is the only museum in America with two historic synagogues, preserved and interpreted for the public. The first is the Lloyd Street Synagogue, a Greek revival design by architect Robert Cary Long Jr. which was finished in 1845. The second is the B'nai Israel Synagogue, which was designed in a modified Moorish revival style by Henry Berge and finished in 1876. Both synagogues are situated in the heart of an historic Jewish neighborhood where they tell the stories of two great waves of Jewish immigrants to Baltimore, the second largest port of immigration in the United States. In these restored synagogues you can explore a matzoh oven, mikvehs (ritual baths), a magnificent hand-carved Torah Ark, women's balconies, and an active archaeology dig. B'nai Israel synagogue is an active Modern Orthodox synagogue of 200 families with services every Shabbat and Jewish Holy Day.

== Location ==
The Jewish Museum of Maryland is located at 15 Lloyd Street in Baltimore and is a 10-minute walk from the National Aquarium in the Inner Harbor. The museum is closed for Jewish festivals and holy days: Rosh Hashana, Yom Kippur, Sukkot, Shemini Atzeret, Simchat Torah, first two and last two days of Passover, and Shavuot.

== History ==
The museum was closed for renovations from June 12, 2023, until February 2, 2025.

In 2024, philanthropist and owner of the Baltimore Orioles baseball team David Rubenstein announced he would donate $1.5 million to the museum.
