= National Shrine of St. Alphonsus Liguori =

Historic church in Maryland, United States

- St. Alphonsus' Church, Rectory, Convent and Halle
- U.S. National Register of Historic Places
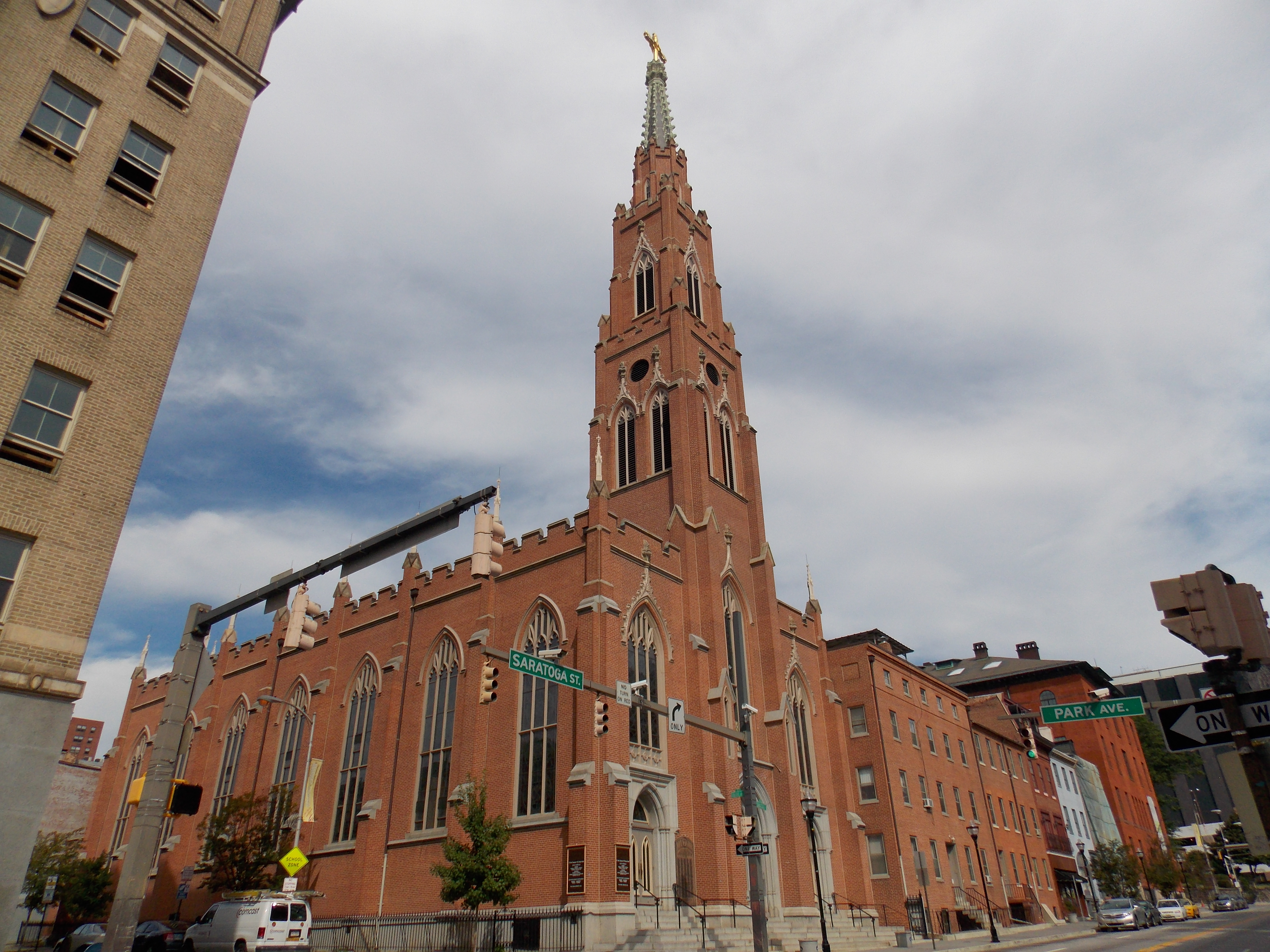
- St. Alphonsus Church and Rectory, September, 2014

- Location within Baltimore Location within Maryland Location within the United States
- Location: 112-116, 125-127 W. Saratoga Street; Baltimore, Maryland
- Coordinates: 39°17′35.4″N 76°37′4.6″W
- Area: 6 acres (2.4 ha)
- Built: 1842
- Architect: Robert Cary Long Jr.
- Architectural style: Gothic Revival
- Website: stalphonsusbalt.org
- NRHP reference No.: 73002195
- Added to NRHP: May 23, 1973

The National Shrine of St. Alphonsus Liguori, also known as St. John Neumann Shrine and "Baltimore's Powerhouse of Prayer," is part of a historic Catholic church complex in Baltimore, Maryland. Founded by the Redemptorists in 1917, the church has extensive affiliations with important figures in Baltimore Catholic history. Since 1992, the parish has held regular Tridentine Masses. It is currently administered by the Priestly Fraternity of Saint Peter. The complex was added to the National Register of Historic Places in 1973 as St. Alphonsus Church, Rectory, Convent and Halle.

== Description ==
The church is based on the design of St. Stephen's Cathedral in Vienna and follows a basilica floor plan. The structure is constructed of red brick with limestone accents in the Gothic Revival style. The nave reaches a height of 50 ft (15 m) and the ornate steeple rises 210 ft (64 m) above the three-level bell tower. A 12 ft (3.7 m) gold cross caps the steeple.

The Halle is a 4 1/2-story brick structure also in the Gothic Revival style opposite the church across Saratoga Street. It features a center entrance housed in projecting square bay topped by a gable. The adjacent three-story convent and the four-story rectory simple Georgian townhouses of brick. The complex was constructed between 1842 and 1845 and was the first major design by Baltimore architect Robert Cary Long Jr. From its founding until 1917, the parish was overseen by the Redemptorist Fathers whose members came to Baltimore to minister to the growing German immigrant community. John Neumann was one of the early pastors of St. Alphonsus prior to becoming Bishop of Philadelphia in 1852. He was canonized on June 19, 1977. Neumann's assistant pastor, Francis Xavier Seelos, served as pastor after his departure and later worked in areas from Connecticut to Illinois and New Orleans. Seelos was beatified on April 9, 2000.

By 1917, many of the German immigrants who lived in the area moved elsewhere and St. Alphonsus became a parish for the Lithuanian immigrant community. St. Alphonsus Church, Rectory, Convent and Halle was listed on the National Register of Historic Places in 1973.

Since 1992, the Tridentine Mass has been offered regularly at St. Alphonsus. Since 2017, the parish has been administered by the Priestly Fraternity of Saint Peter (FSSP), while remaining officially part of the Archdiocese of Baltimore.

== Gallery ==
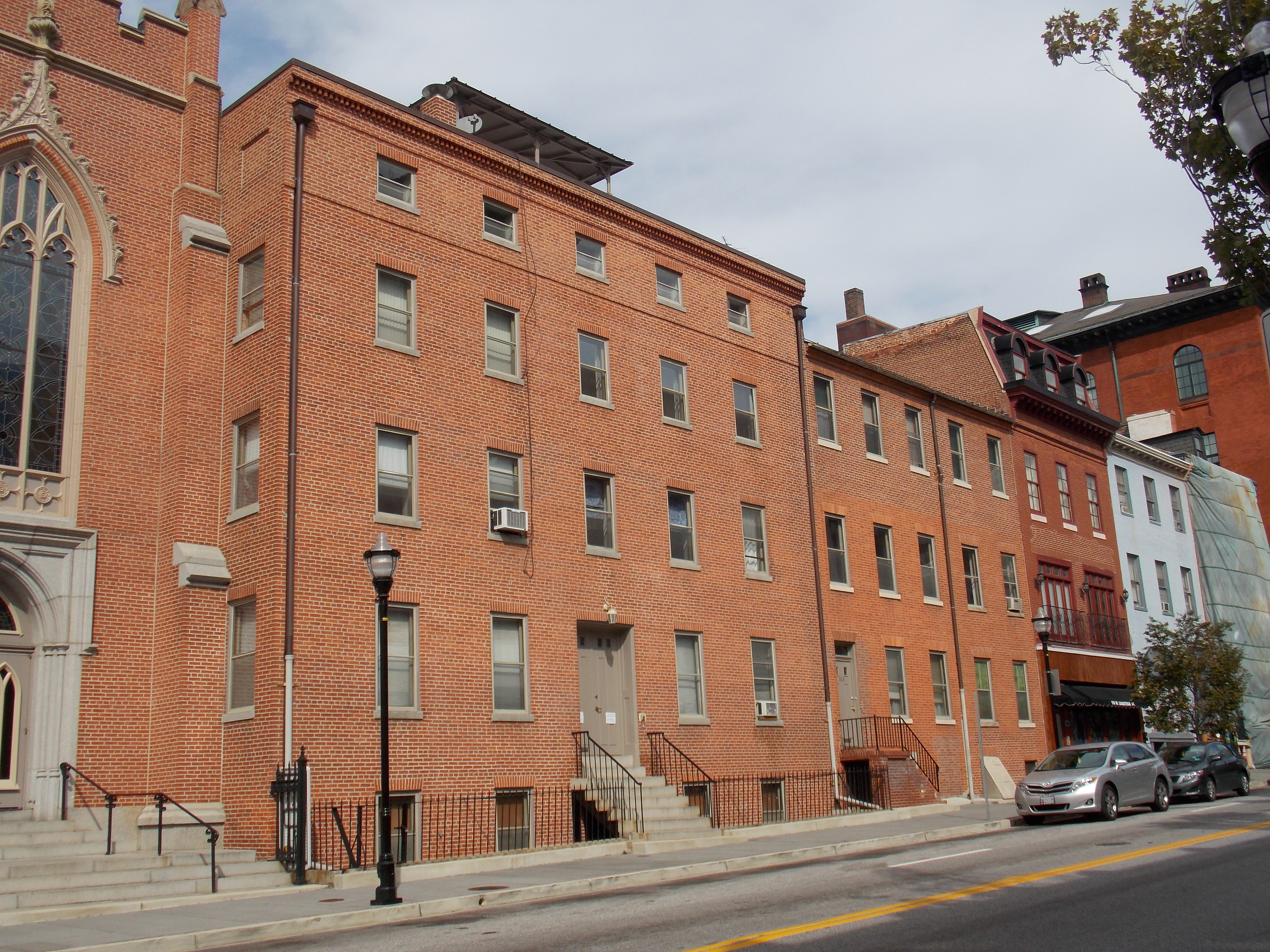
Rectory and Convent

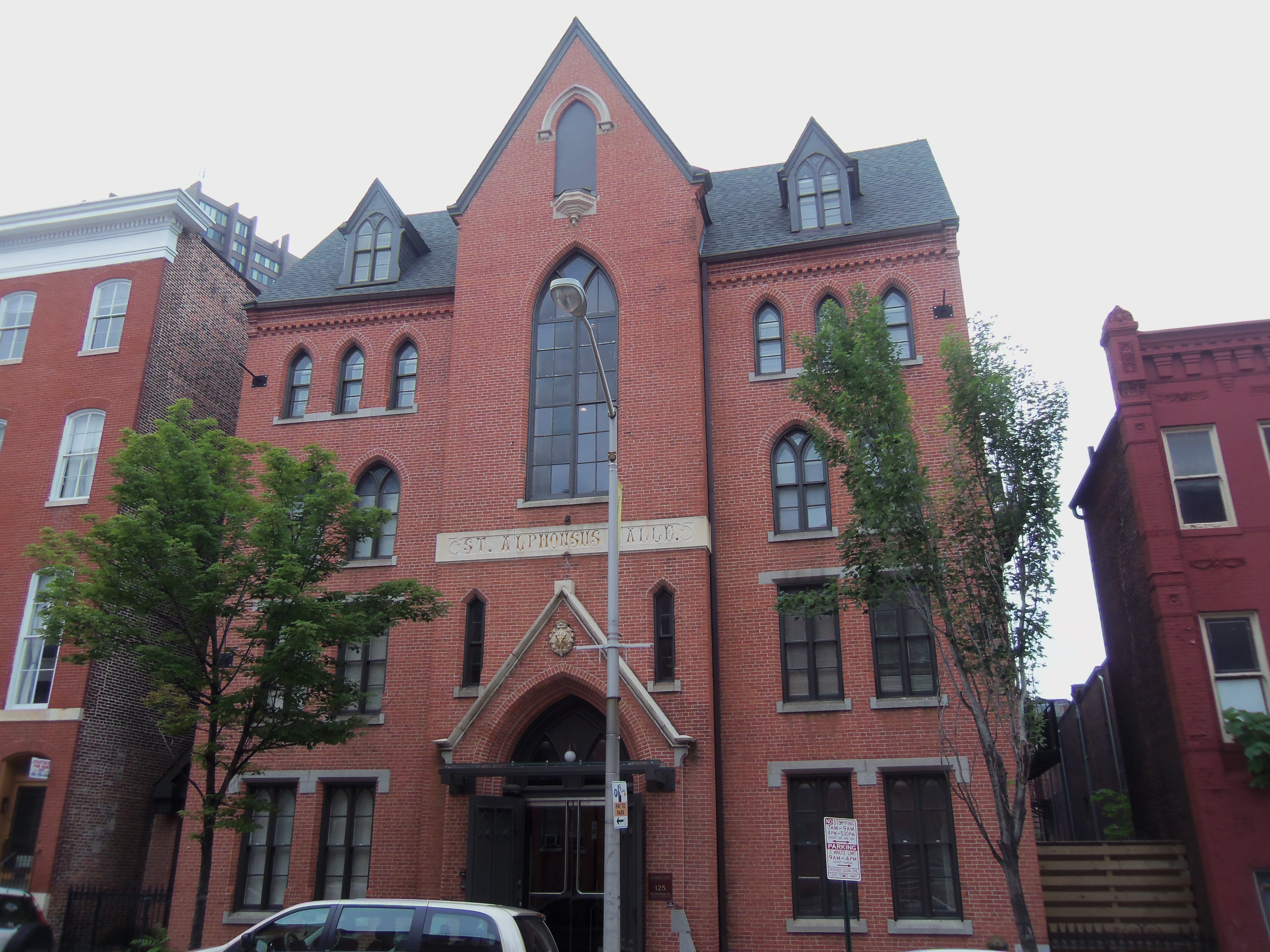
St. Alphonsus Halle

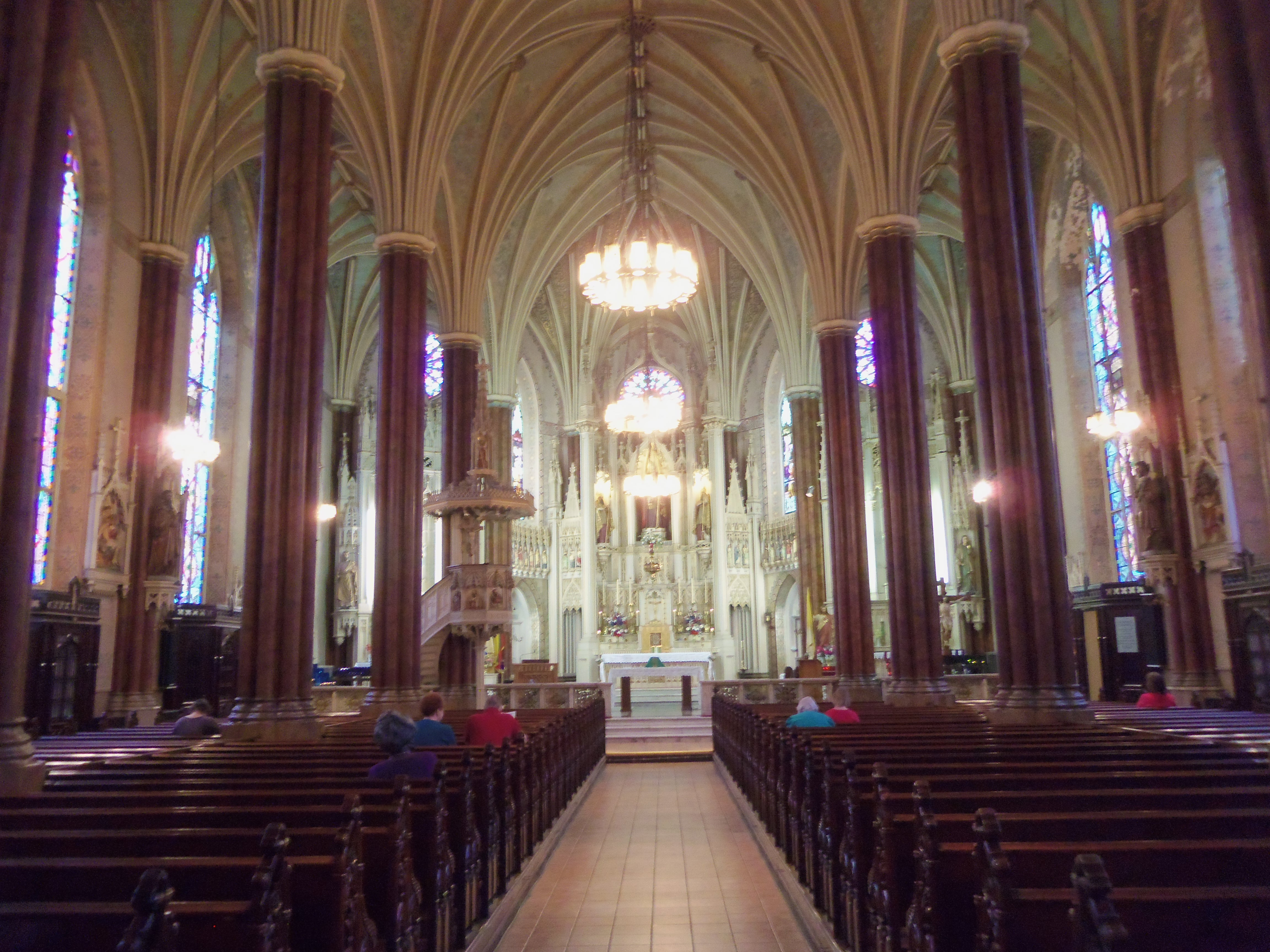
Church interior
