= Robert Cary Long Jr. =

American architect

Robert Cary Long Jr. (1810–1849) was the son of a late 18th Century - early 19th Century famous architect Robert Cary Long Sr. of Baltimore, Maryland and was himself a well-known 19th Century architect. Like his father, Cary was based in Baltimore.

== Life ==
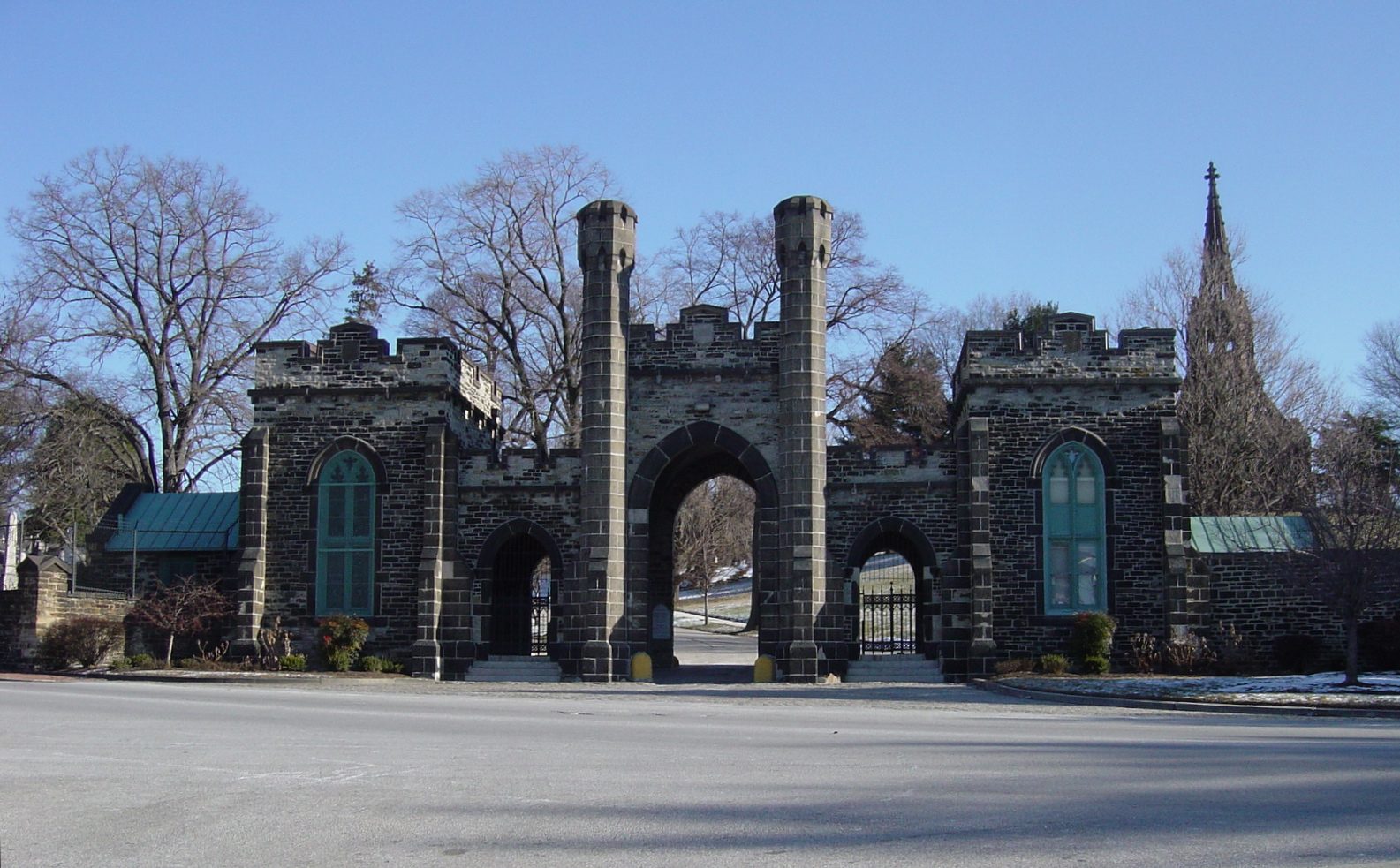
GreenmountCemeteryBaltimore

Robert Cary Long Jr. was educated at St. Mary's College in Baltimore, Maryland. Upon graduating, he trained with Ithiel Town at the office of Martin E. Thompson in New York. A significant portion of Town's work was in the Federal and Greek revival and Gothic Revival styles.

After the death of his father in 1833, Long returned to Baltimore and continued the practice. One of his early commissions was a finishing school, the Patapsco Female Institute, designed in 1834. He and William Reasin designed the Lloyd Street Synagogue in Greek Revival style. Long was the preferred architect of Episcopal Bishop William Rollinson Whittingham, for whom he designed Mount Calvary Church. The Gothic Revival gateway at Green Mount Cemetery dates to 1839.

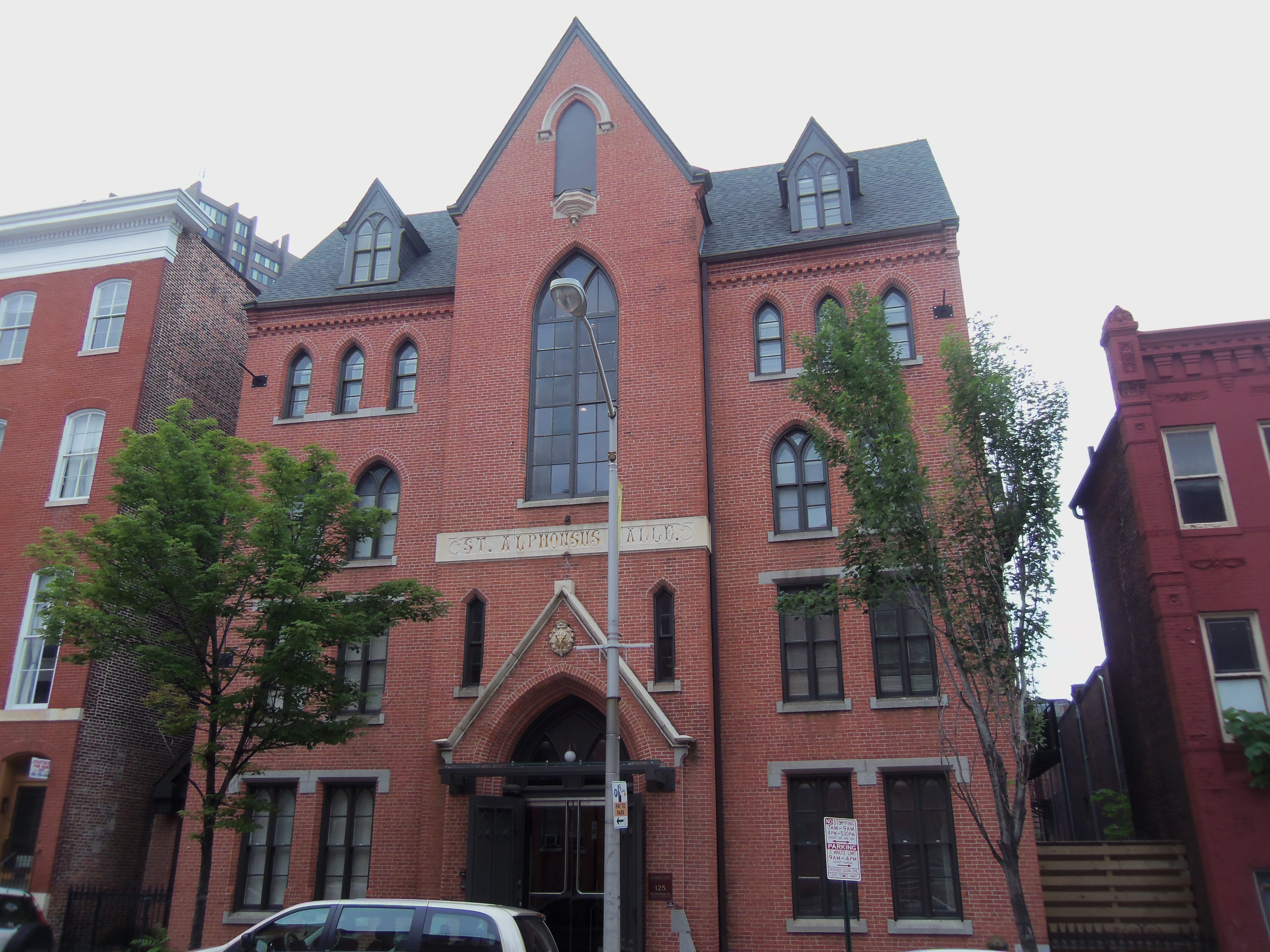
St. Alphonsus Halle, Baltimore

The Cathedral of Our Lady of Sorrows in Natchez, Mississippi was designed around 1842. The on-site supervising architect was James Hardie. The bishop of Natchez was John J. Chanche, former president of St. Mary's College. Two years before, Long had designed for Chanche a steeple for the 1806 seminary chapel which had been designed by Maximilian Godefroy. The church in Natchez is similar to Long's contemporary Church of St. Alphonsus in Baltimore. The diocesan see was later translated to Jackson; the building was designated St. Mary Basilica in 1998.

The Church of St. Alphonsus was commissioned by the Redemptorists who had come to Baltimore to tend the German-speaking Catholics. The work entailed not only the Gothic Revival church, but a convent and rectory, both brick Georgian townhouses, and St. Alphonsus Halle. Construction took place between 1842 and 1845, and was Long's first major project. The church is designed in Southern German neo-Gothic style. The attached rectory served as the provincial headquarters for the Redemptorist Fathers and Brothers.

== Baltimore ==
- Old St. Paul's Episcopal Church (Third Building, 1812, destroyed by fire)
- National Shrine of St. Alphonsus Liguori listed on the National Register of Historic Places (NRHP)
- St. Peter the Apostle Church, listed on the National Register of Historic Places (NRHP)
- Mount Calvary Church (Episcopal/Anglican/now Roman Catholic)
- Lloyd Street Synagogue, NRHP listed
- Green Mount Cemetery, NRHP listed
- Franklin Street Presbyterian Church and Parsonage, NRHP listed
- Govans Presbyterian Church, 1844. Addition of belltower and other in 1906 by Bayard Turnbull

== Elsewhere ==
- Cathedral of Our Lady of Sorrows, Natchez, Mississippi
- Baker Mansion in Altoona, Pennsylvania, NRHP listed
- Virginia School for the Deaf and Blind in Staunton, Virginia, NRHP listed
- St. George's Episcopal Church in Fredericksburg, Virginia

Also known as a well-known local architect, Robert Cary Long Sr., younger Long's father, also assisted in the construction of the famous iconic old "Assembly Rooms" building which was designed by local landowner Col. Lloyd Nicholas Rogers of "Druid Hill" mansion in 1797. Sited on the northeast corner of Holliday and East Fayette Streets, of Georgian/Federal styled architecture, used for the Baltimore Dancing Assembly with their frequent receptions, dances, social events and soirees along with various intellectuctual and cultural events.

Robert Cary Long Sr. also designed "Mount Ida" within the NRHP-listed Ellicott City Historic District in Ellicott City, Maryland.

== See also ==
- List of architects
