= St. Paul's Episcopal Church (Baltimore) =

Historic church in Maryland, US

- St. Paul's Protestant Episcopal Church
- U.S. National Register of Historic Places
- Baltimore City Landmark
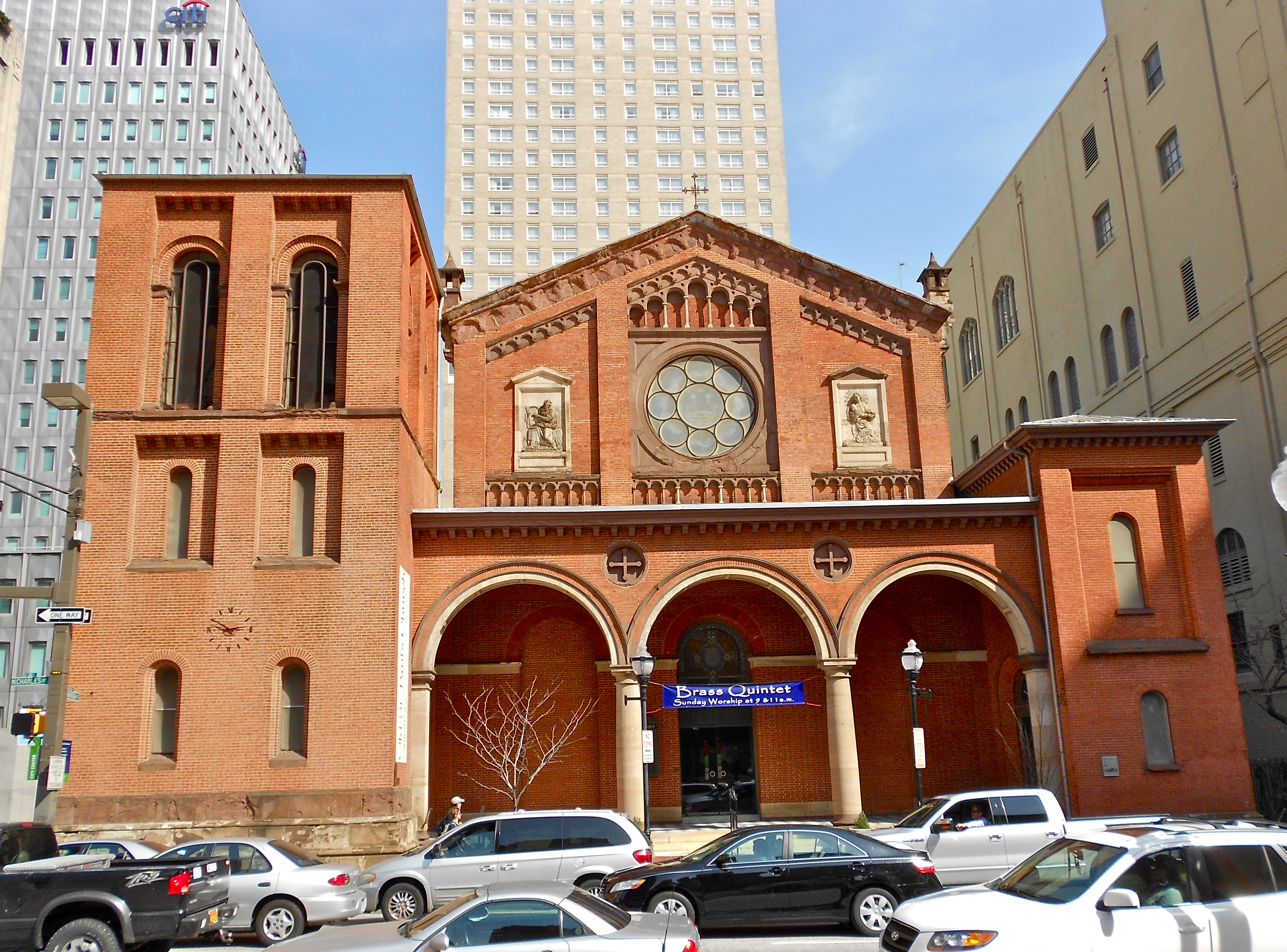
- Old St. Paul's Church, March 2012

- Location within Baltimore Location within Maryland Location within the United States
- Location: 233 N. Charles St., Baltimore, Maryland
- Coordinates: 39°17′31.7″N 76°36′54.1″W
- Area: 0.4 acres (0.16 ha)
- Built: 1854
- Architect: Upjohn, Richard
- Architectural style: Basilica style
- NRHP reference No.: 73002198

Significant dates
- Added to NRHP: March 30, 1973
- Designated BCL: 1975

St. Paul's Protestant Episcopal Church, more commonly called Old St. Paul's Church today, is a historic Episcopal church located at 233 North Charles Street at the southeast corner with East Saratoga Street, in Baltimore, Maryland, (United States) near "Cathedral Hill" on the northern edge of the downtown central business district to the south and the Mount Vernon-Belevedere cultural/historic neighborhood to the north. It was founded in 1692 as the parish church for the "Patapsco Parish", one of the "original 30 parishes" of the old Church of England in colonial Maryland (now part of the Episcopal Church, U.S.A. and the Anglican Communion).

The church reported 418 members in 2021 and 506 members in 2023; no membership statistics were reported in 2024 parochial reports. Plate and pledge income reported for the congregation in 2024 was $207,132 with average Sunday attendance (ASA) of 88 persons.

== History ==
=== 17th-18th centuries ===
St. Paul's was founded in 1692 under the Establishment Act, by the General Assembly of Maryland under Lionel Copley, then the colonial/provincial Governor of Maryland, in the Province of Maryland under the Lord Proprietorship of the Lords Baltimore, which created 30 "Protestant" (Anglican) parishes in the colony of Maryland. The first church as "Patapsco Parish" was located somewhere along near the head of Colgate Creek, on the north shore of the Patapsco River and "Patapsco Neck" peninsula which juts into the Chesapeake Bay at North Point and Sparrows Point between the Patapsco River to the south and Back River (Maryland) to the north. Modern-day Highlandtown and Canton in southeastern Baltimore City and Dundalk, Edgemere, and Fort Howard are in suburban communities in southeastern Baltimore County there now. When Baltimore Town was founded in its present location in 1729/1730, the parish moved to "Lot 19," in the Original Survey" of 1730 at the highest point just inside the original town boundaries on the north end which were purchased from Charles Carroll of Annapolis, (1702-1782), (father of nationally famous Charles Carroll of Carrollton, (1732-1832), later longest living signer of the Declaration of Independence, only Roman Catholic to do so, and wealthiest man in America). Here a small brick church, (facing south towards the harbor), a rectory and some cemetery plots were placed in 1739 on a cliff overlooking the Jones Falls stream (which divided the town from adjacent Jonestown to the east and Fells Point to the southeast waterfront) and northwest of the original Courthouse Square (later became Battle Monument Square after its construction, 1815-1822) at North Calvert between East Lexington and Fayette Streets. The present "Old Saint Paul's Church (as it is generally known throughout the state) is located now on a portion of that property, in the northwest corner of the original platted lot of 1730.

A second brick church, also built facing south towards "The Basin" (Inner Harbor), was completed in 1784 and consecrated by Bishop Thomas John Claggett, first Episcopal Bishop of Maryland (consecrated/ordained 1792) in 1797 (also the year of Baltimore Town's incorporation into a City) and endured on the site until 1812 when replaced by the Long-designed edifice. The second church continued to use the former steeple of the first church building as a private prayer chapel where it was relocated in the middle of the surrounding cemetery to the north and west along the sloping hill along future East Saratoga Street and Saint Paul Lane/Street.

=== 19th century and later ===
Gravestones, bodies and coffins, along with other cemetery material were relocated in 1800 to the western side of town at a new plot and cemetery at West Lombard and Fremont Streets, near the present Martin Luther King Jr. Boulevard, (which curves around the west-side of downtown) and southwest of the multi-blocks campus of the downtown University of Maryland at Baltimore. Construction of King Boulevard in the late 1970s required that a portion of the historic cemetery on its western side was taken for road and sidewalk use and the ancient plots and stone wall were moved slightly eastward and reconstructed. Numerous American Revolutionary War, War of 1812 officers and soldiers are buried here, along with an unusually large number of Baltimore and Maryland civic, business and commercial leaders from the region’s early history.

All Episcopal parishes in Baltimore City and many in Baltimore County (along with Harford, Cecil, Kent, and Carroll Counties, which were formerly part of old original Baltimore County in the 17th and early 18th Centuries) are in some way traced to Old St. Paul's Church. The first "daughter" congregation, Christ Church (closed 1986), was created in 1796 near the present day War Memorial/City Hall Plaza at the southwest corner of South Gay and East Fayette Streets. This building was later transferred to another Episcopal parish named Messiah which remained here until it was burned in the Great Baltimore Fire of 1904. Christ Episcopal congregation then moved to the northwest corner of St. Paul and East Chase Streets, where the building is now used by an evangelical Protestant congregation. Another congregation, St. Peter's, was created in an evangelical controversy resulting in a split from Old St. Paul's in 1801 during the rectorate of the Rev. Dr. Joseph Bend; that congregation is known today known as Grace and St. Peter's Church, located at Park Avenue and West Monument Street, two blocks west of the Washington Monument, across the street from the former brownstone mansion which served as Diocesan House (bishop's and administrative staff offices) in the Mount Vernon-Belvedere neighborhood, further northwest. Grace and St. Peter's Parish has now evolved into a high church "Anglo-Catholic" parish, with a very well-regarded co-educational private day school.

The third building in Baltimore City (and fourth of the parish in its history) erected for St. Paul's was designed by noted Baltimore architect Robert Cary Long Jr., (1810-1849), and constructed in 1812 (some sources say 1814-1817). This neo-classical structure faced towards the west on Charles Street, seated 1,600 people in the main level and galleries and was graced with a 126 foot high spire. The three orders of Greek columns adorned the building. It was destroyed by fire in 1854; the cross that fell from that tower now adorns the old Church Home Hospital on Broadway in Baltimore. The fourth church was completed two years later.

The 1856 building reflected the growing influence of the Oxford Movement in the Episcopal Church. Richard Upjohn's design for the new building invoked not the democratic values of the Federal Period but the Catholicism of Italy, which he had recently toured. He also had just designed the famous Gothic Trinity Church on Wall Street in lower New York City Since the existing walls of St. Paul's did not allow for the pointed-gothic design preferred by the Ecclesiological Society, Upjohn patterned the building after the Basilica of San Giorgio in Rome. The side galleries so important to preaching were not rebuilt, and focus in the building was dramatically pointed to the altar with a spacious (for the time) chancel.

Thus the "high church" position that St. Paul's had occupied since the rectorate of Dr. Bend became more pronounced, especially under the rectorate of Dr. William Wyatt, who oversaw the construction of the new building and the creation of a number of Anglo-Catholic mission parishes around Baltimore City, most notably Mount Calvary Church. His successor, the Rev. Milo Mahan, introduced candles on the altar and seasonal liturgical colors.

Two rectors of Old St. Paul's have gone on to become bishops of the Episcopal Diocese of Maryland: The Right Rev. James Kemp (1764-1827) and the Right Rev. Harry Lee Doll, (1903-1984).

For many years St. Paul's held the distinction of having the finest liturgical music in the city. In 1873, the Rev. John Sebastian Bach Hodges replaced the church's paid quartet with a professional Choir of Men and Boys, which sang continuously for 141 years. In 2002 a Choir of Girls was created during the rectorship of the Rev. David Cobb, as a complementary ensemble. A mixed adult choir (volunteers plus professionals), formed under the leadership of the Rev. Mark Stanley, now sings for the primary Sunday service. Noted former Organist/Choirmasters of Old St. Paul's include Rodney Hansen, Daniel Fortune, Jeremy Filsell, Diane Meredith Belcher, and Douglas Buchanan.

== Architecture and design ==
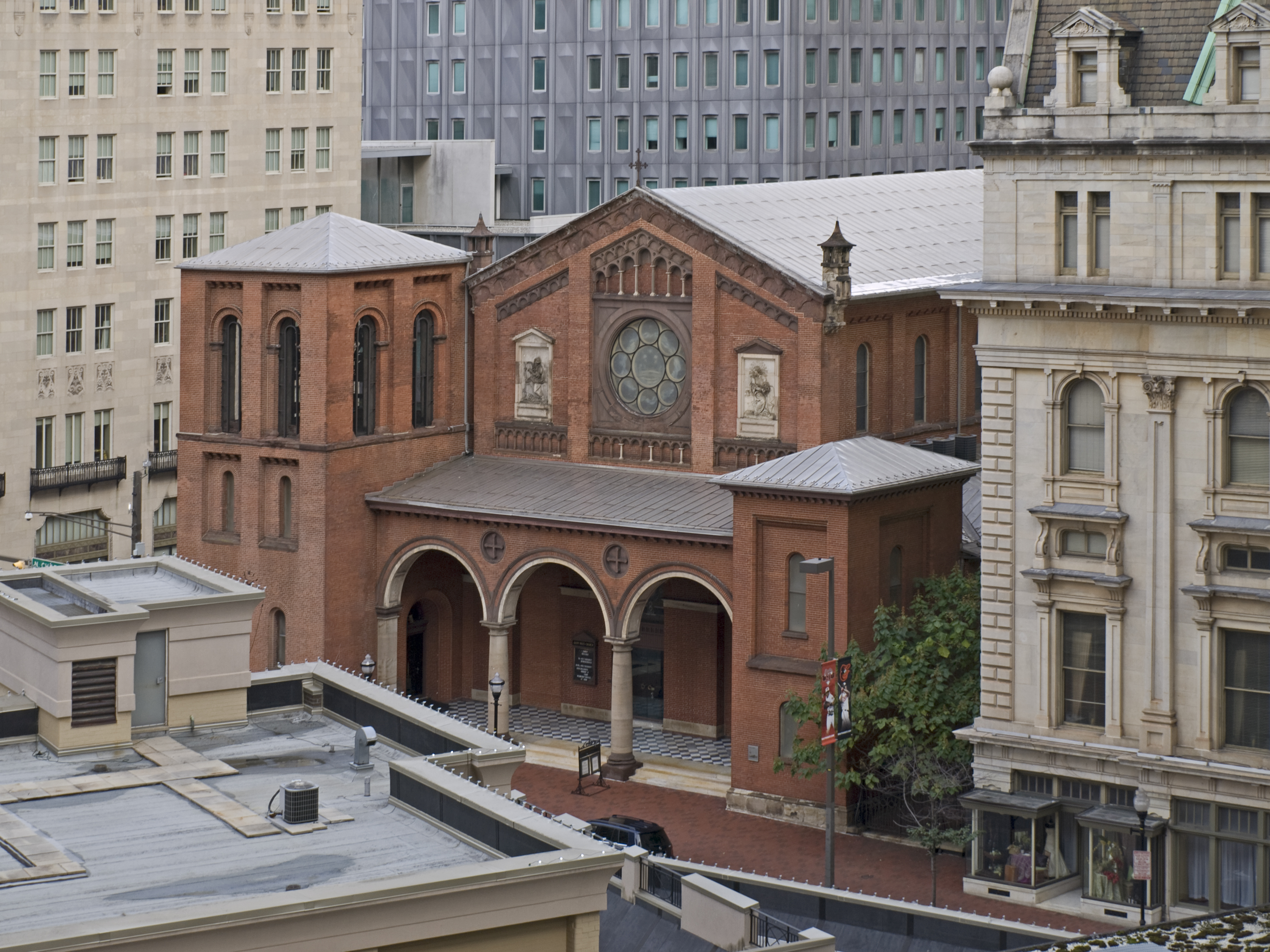
The aerial view

The present church was designed by renowned architect Richard Upjohn, with an eclectic juxtaposition of 12th-century Italian elements on the exterior and Romanesque elements on the interior. The exterior facade features two bas-reliefs of Christ and Moses, executed by the Italian sculptor Antonio Capellano (who also sculpted the statue on the top of the Battle Monument) that were originally part of the façade of the previous Robert Cary Long church. Other elements from the 1817 structure include the walls of the Federal period building, a stained glass window of the risen Christ over the entrance, a marble baptismal font designed by Maximilian Godefroy (who also designed the Battle Monument and the First Unitarian Church), and the Bishop's chair given to St. Paul's in 1815.

The church was given a relatively dark Victorian appearance when opened. The Greek columns were painted a sandstone orange, with an elaborate color scheme of brown, red, and yellow ochres dominating the rest of the nave. The chancel was dominated by a black walnut reredos. A small stained-glass window of St. Paul stood above the high altar. English Minton tiles adorned the aisles and chancel that complemented the color scheme of the church. An anonymous painting of this interior is still in the possession of the parish.

In 1903, the chancel was renovated to a brighter appearance, in accordance with the tastes of the period. The reredos was moved to the back of the church (where it still stands as a memorial wall), and a new Tiffany reredos was installed with a completely new design for the east wall, including a large chancel window by Helen Maitland Armstrong was installed above the altar, with the St. Paul window moved to the south aisle. The ochres of the 1850s gave way to white faux blocks etched into the nave.

The oldest of the aisle windows date to 1890, but most were installed at the same time as the chancel redecoration. The designers include Tiffany Studios of New York City and Clayton & Bell Studios.

In the 1930s, the faux blocking was removed, leaving only tracery around the windows. The chancel was renovated for cleaning and maintenance in the 1990s. In the summer of 2013, the interior of the church underwent a historic restoration that included painting the nave and adding a blue field with gold stars to the ceiling.

== Noted members ==
Prominent members of the parish include Samuel Chase, John Eager Howard, Thomas Johnson, and William Donald Schaefer (mayor of Baltimore and governor, comptroller of Maryland).

== Historic designations ==
St. Paul's Protestant Episcopal Church was listed on the National Register of Historic Places in 1973. It is included within the Cathedral Hill Historic District and the Baltimore National Heritage Area.

== See also ==
- St. Paul's Church Rectory
