= St. Paul's Church Rectory =

- U.S. National Register of Historic Places
- Baltimore City Landmark
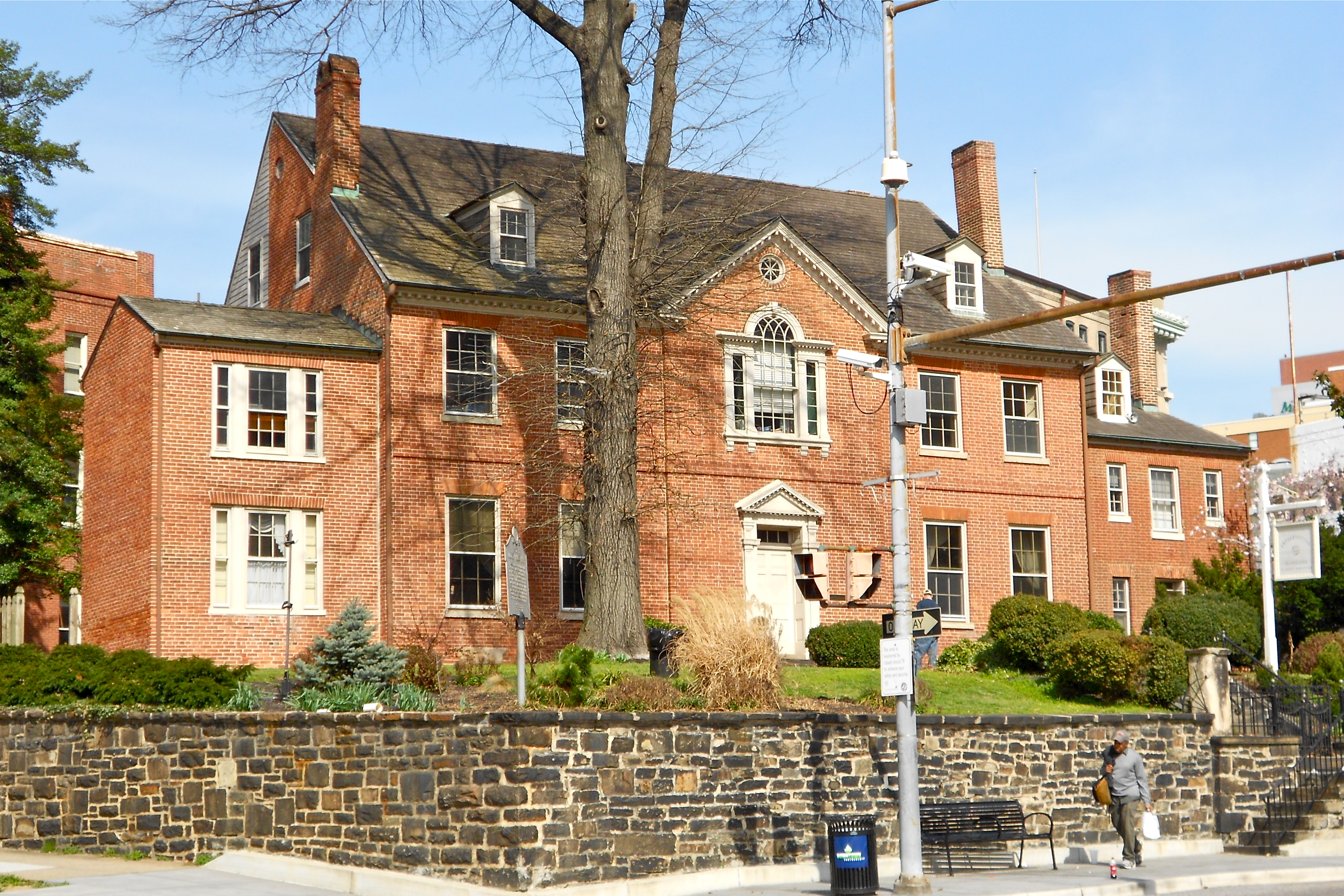
- St. Paul's Church Rectory, March 2012

- Location within Baltimore Location within Maryland Location within the United States
- Location: 24 West Saratoga Street, (between North Charles and Cathedral/North Liberty/Sharp Streets), in Baltimore, Maryland
- Coordinates: 39°17′34″N 76°36′57″W
- Area: 0.3 acres (0.12 ha)
- Built: 1789
- Architectural style: Georgian
- NRHP reference No.: 73002197

Significant dates
- Added to NRHP: March 20, 1973
- Designated BCL: 1975

St. Paul's Church Rectory, located a block west of Old St. Paul's Episcopal Church (formerly "Protestant Episcopal" since 1789, Anglican/Church of England before) is a historic Episcopal rectory located on steep "Cathedral Hill" at the northeast corner of Cathedral Street (which merges with North Liberty Street, which becomes Hopkins Place and South Sharp Street further south) and West Saratoga Streets in downtown Baltimore, Maryland, United States. In the rear of the old rectory is a small alley-like extension of West Pleasant Street and to the east behind the North Charles Street former residences and now commercial structures, is another small alley extension of Little (or North) Sharp Street.

In 2019, the Historic Rectory underwent a major renovation, overseen by The Rev. Mary Luck Stanley, Associate Rector, to restore it for the ministry purposes of the parishioners of Old St. Paul's Church. After thirty years of being leased away to an outside group, the Historic Rectory has been reclaimed by the church and will now be serving as an "Urban Retreat House" on the first floor, and as the "Parish Offices" on the second floor. Lauren Myatt and Peter Schwab, from Murphy & Dittenhafer Architects, provided the designs for the 2019 renovation. A. R. Marani Inc. General Contractors managed the nine month construction. On May 18, 2019, clergy, church leaders, architects, and contractors gathered at the Historic Rectory for a "House Blessing" to mark the beginning of a new season for this building that was once a home for the clergy of St. Paul’s, and is now a gathering place for the church’s members. Clergy and Vestry Members from 2013 to 2019 voted to be good stewards of this historic property by providing the resources to restore the grandeur of this 1791 home, thus contributing to the beautification of downtown Baltimore.

== Location ==
It is located on ground donated by Col. John Eager Howard (1752–1827), commander of the famed "Maryland Line" regiment of the Continental Army in the American Revolutionary War and who was noted at the Battles of Brooklyn (Long Island) in New York, Monmouth in New Jersey, Guilford Courthouse in North Carolina, and the Cowpens in South Carolina. He was also former Governor of Maryland and U. S. Senator along with being an influential Baltimorean. He owned the large estate of "Belvidere" north of the town which was also known as "Howard's Woods", with his Georgian/Federal style mansion located at the modern intersection of East Chase and North Calvert Streets (which was razed around 1875, when Calvert Street was extended further north to the old city limits at Boundary Avenue (now North Avenue). Many land donations of his went to churches, schools and other public institutions such as the Lexington Market as the town grew north and west. Most notably the land on which the City's most important landmark, the Washington Monument now sits (built 1815–1827), with its four surrounding park-like squares (East and West Mount Vernon Place along with North and South Washington Place – laid out early 1830s) which has added so much character to the neighborhood and made Baltimore famous, came from his generousity. Plus after his death, his sons and family descendants further developed the extensive estate and land holdings, constructed or bought many townhouses and mansions on the newly platted grid of streets in the coming Victorian era. The Howards grew richer and more prosperous on the development rights in what became known as the Mount Vernon-Belvedere neighborhood and what became known as the "Western Precincts" of the rapidly expanding city, then the fourth largest in America.

== Description ==
Surrounded by a tall stone retaining wall around the remnants of the hill-top estate in the northwest of the town which dominated the new small settlement first laid out in 1729–1730, as there were no houses originally between it and Long Street, (later Market Street, now West Baltimore Street). It is a three-story Late Georgian / Federal style brick building constructed between 1789 and 1791. The front facade features a bull's-eye window in the peak of a dentiled pediment. A two-story extension was added to the west end of the Rectory in the mid-1830s. Later known as the "Parsonage on the Hill", it is one of the oldest existing houses in the city with a verifiable date of construction.

== History ==
The original first church building had begun construction on Lot #19 of the "Original Survey of 1730" at Forest (now North Charles) Street and newly named Saratoga Street (after the turning-point victory of the Colonials during the American Revolution at the Battle of Saratoga in upper New York State in 1777). The lot extended as far south as New Church Street (modern East Lexington Street) and further east to what was then called St. Paul's Lane (now St. Paul Street and Place/adjoining "Preston Gardens") soon after the town was established in 1729. The parish church was moved then from near Colgate Creek (later the site in the 1920s of the Harbor Field, municipal airport, later the Dundalk Marine Terminal of the Helen Delich Bentley Port of Baltimore) southeast of the present City from on the "Patapsco Neck" peninsula of southeastern surrounding Baltimore County and was completed nine years later (1739) as the first brick building in new Baltimore Town. The new parish structure was situated at the north end of the town surrounded by a cemetery, perched on the cliffs facing what was called Saint Paul's Lane overlooking the southwestward loop of the Jones Falls flowing towards "The Basin" (now the Inner Harbor), which veered towards the new courthouse later built in 1767 (when the growing town became the county seat of Baltimore County) on the Courthouse Square to the southeast (now the location of the current landmark, the Battle Monument of 1815–1822) in the present vicinity of North Calvert Street between modern East Fayette and East Lexington Streets.

After only seven years since the completion of the four-year construction project of the parish's second brick building in front of the older one of 1739 and which had been dedicated by the rector, Dr. William West on Whitsuntide/Pentecost, Sunday, May 30, 1784, surrounded by the cemetery on the slopes above the Falls. The former 1739 structure's wooden bell steeple was erected in the center of the churchyard/cemetery after it was torn down in November 1786. An illustration drawing/painting of the scene in the late 18th Century, is exhibited on the Baltimore City National Heritage Area historical exhibit/tourism pylon (historical marker; also silver aluminium plaque from city Commission for Historical and Architectural Preservation from early 1980s affixed to church brick wall) across the street from the present church (southwest corner of Charles and Saratoga Streets) at Charles Plaza, northernmost extent of the Charles Center downtown redevelopment project of the late 1950s to 1960s.

Situated a block to the west, the House was originally built for the Rev. Dr. William West, rector of the church since June 7, 1779, and a friend and former neighbor of George Washington, at Mount Vernon, Virginia, but was completed after his death, March 30, 1791, and he never occupied it. After a lottery was held beginning in April 1788, "for the purpose of building a parsonage for the minister of the Protestant Episcopal congregation in Baltimore Town", 3,000 tickets were sold at $2.00 each, with prizes of $4,000 total, leaving $2,000 for the construction of the house. The managers of the lottery were: John Moale, John Merryman, Andrew T. Ennals, John Eager Howard, John Weatherburn, John Hammond, George Grundy, Dr. Darling, James Calhoun (first mayor of Baltimore Town since 1794, then City after 1797 to 1804), Englehard Yeider, George P. Keeports, William Gibson, William McCreery, Thomas Hollingsworth, and Andrew Buchanan - all prominent citizens in the early years of the burgeoning town.

Previous to the construction of the Saratoga Street mansion, Dr. West resided in a parsonage located one block south of the church at the northwest corner of Forest (later Charles) and New Church Street (later renamed West Lexington Street after the Revolution; future site of the early "skyscraper" of gray granite, Fidelity and Deposit Trust Company building of 1894, founded 1890 by future Maryland Gov., Edwin Warfield). Rev. Dr. West's home was one-story frame house with a "hip-roof" painted red and had a yard in front ornamented with trees and shrubbery, on the hilly edge of the settlement.

Used as a family residence by all of the rectors of Old St. Paul's since the summer of 1791 starting with West's successor minister, the Rev. Dr. Joseph J. G. Bend (who died November 1812) until the last occupant, The Rev. Fr. William McKeachie of England and his family in the early 1990s, when after some minor renovations and additional commercial re-wiring, it was rented to Preservation Maryland, Inc. for them to use as their offices.

To the northwest of the Rectory, at 309 Cathedral Street which is on the southeast corner with West Pleasant Street alley is "Saint Paul's House" which was built in the 1880s following the connection of Cathedral Street to the north with Liberty/Hopkins Place/South Sharp Streets to the south. This was enabled by the razing in 1883 to the Rectory's west of the Greek Revival 1820s-era townhouse/mansion of A.S. Abell, (Arunah Shepherdson Abell, 1806–1888), founder and beginning of the Abell-Black families dynasty which owned and published the Baltimore Sun since 1837, one of the city's largest newspapers and influential from its early years in the nation.

To the east on Saratoga was the 1830s-era city townhouse of red brick and limestone/marble trim in the Greek Revival style of local merchant and financier Johns Hopkins (1795-1873), who died in the house by Little Sharp Street. It complemented his country estate in the northeast city of "Clifton" (which is still standing and located in middle of today's Clifton Park) in northeast Baltimore which was to be the original site of The Johns Hopkins University that he provided for in his will of 1867, before his death in 1873 on Saratoga Street. But it instead was temporarily located by his appointed trustees board along with their newly recruited first president, Daniel Coit Gilman, along North Howard and West Centre Streets for fifty years. After the Hopkins mansion was razed, it was replaced by a two-level, crumbling concrete parking garage in the 1950s, which is still an eyesore to the neighborhood.

The Hopkins residence also was adjoining the previous site in the late 18th and early 19th Centuries of "the Roman Catholic Congregation of Baltimore Town", founded 1770 and incorporated 1795 as St. Peter's Church and the first organized group of Catholics in the city. After the 1789 appointment of Father John Carroll as the first Roman Catholic bishop in America, and his subsequent return home after his ordination in England, he was installed in August 1790 in the now "St. Peter's Pro-Cathedral" as "the ordinary" (bishop) of what became known as "The Premier See", the Diocese of Baltimore. Later that year, St. Peter's Pro-Cathedral saw the meeting of the first synod of priests of the new national American diocese (along with a western diocese in Bardstown, Kentucky; now the Roman Catholic Archdiocese of Louisville) and opening ceremonies for the newly established St. Mary's Seminary located further to the northwest on the Hookstown Road (later Pennsylvania Avenue) and its movement to and later establishment on North Paca Street of its adjoining secular St. Mary's College. After the construction of Benjamin Henry Latrobe's "Old Baltimore Cathedral" (later the Basilica of the Assumption of Mary), constructed one block further north at Cathedral Street, between West Mulberry and Franklin Streets during 1806–1821; old, but important and historic St. Peter's Pro-Cathedral was razed in 1841 along with its adjoining red-brick rectory, school and cemetery along West Saratoga and North Charles Streets on the northwest corner, on the opposite corner of the third parish structure (1814/17-1854) of the four buildings of Old St. Paul's Parish. It was at old St. Peter's Church and Pro-Cathedral, that notable events during 1790 to 1821 occurred in the history of the Roman Catholic Archdiocese of Baltimore and the Church in America, such as the first ordination of a bishop, the convening of a synod of priests, and the offices and ministry of the first American bishop.

"St. Paul's House" on adjacent Cathedral Street, was used for parish offices of the congregation and as a parish/social hall and after some commercial renovations in the mid-1990s, was additionally rented and sub-let to several religious and charitable organizations.

In the rear of the Rectory, to the north across the Pleasant Street alley is the unassuming backs of the fancy townhouses fronting along West Mulberry Street. In a back parlor, (facing the rear porches and yard of the Church's house) imbibing brandy and fine cigars, a group of three literate men in October 1833 perused several manuscripts and decided on one that showed great mysterious promise. After that evening at civic leader John H. B. Latrobe's house (son of the famed architect Benjamin), joined by John Pendleton Kennedy and another, they agreed on "MS Found In A Bottle" to be published in the journal Baltimore Sunday Visitor launching the career of the mercurial Edgar Allan Poe.

Built in 1891–92, across Cathedral Street to the west from the historic Georgian/Federal House, the Odd Fellows order constructed a large five-story hall of red brick which was lovingly renovated preserving its historic features in the early 1980s and several offices were installed within. To its north, up the street sat the former boys high school in gray granite stone, run by the Christian Brothers as Calvert Hall College, founded 1845 and located here on the southwestern corner of Cathedral and West Mulberry Street from 1890 to 1960, when CHC moved north to suburban Baltimore County, near Towson, when it was replaced by the white starkly modern Archdiocesan Building offices for the Roman Catholic Archdiocese of Baltimore since 1963.

Across the street from the Rectory for over seventy years was the famous "Rennert Hotel" on the southeastern corner of Saratoga with Cethedral-Liberty Streets. A massive triangular pile of bricks with turrets and flourishes, the Rennert was constructed in the 1870s and became the premier "hang-out" spot for local machine politicians. It was the site of a famous joyous celebration and photograph surrounding famed Baltimore writer/reporter/editor/columnist/author/linguist H. L. Mencken, (1880-1956), as he took the first drink in Baltimore of legalized beer after the repeal of Prohibition in 1933. The crusty old warren of a hostellery and brick pile with its Victorian decorative features was torn down in 1941, and despite many re-development attempts, nothing has ever re-surfaced from its site as a small triangular three-level parking garage, later also in turn razed in the 1980s for a parking lot for another seventy years. The Rectory however sits on the northern edge of the Charles Center project now overlooking most of the starkly modernistic skyscrapers of the 1960s and 70s and its three plazas, along with the former Baltimore Civic Center (now the 1st Mariner Arena). Before all the demolition began, West Lexington Street, one block south was the scene of Baltimore's tightly-compacted, earlier 20th Century entertainment district along West Lexington Street with over a dozen elaborate movie theatres and palaces stretched on the several blocks.

== Historic places ==
St. Paul's Church Rectory was listed on the National Register of Historic Places on March 20, 1973, which is maintained by the U.S. Department of the Interior's National Park Service according to the Congressional "Historic Sites Act" of August 21, 1935. It is included within the Cathedral Hill Historic District which is in the southern part of the Mount Vernon-Belvedere neighborhood, north of downtown Baltimore, and the Baltimore National Heritage Area which is maintained by several private and governmental entities: the Baltimore City Heritage Area Association, Inc. (organized 2005), which is a local community-benefits district agency; the Baltimore City Commission for Historical and Architectural Preservation, Baltimore Heritage, Inc., Preservation Maryland, Inc. (which coincidentally has had its offices in the Rectory for the last decade), the Baltimore City Historical Society (founded 1998), and the Maryland Historical Society (founded 1844).
