= First Presbyterian Church and Manse (Baltimore) =

Historic church in Maryland, United States

- U.S. National Register of Historic Places
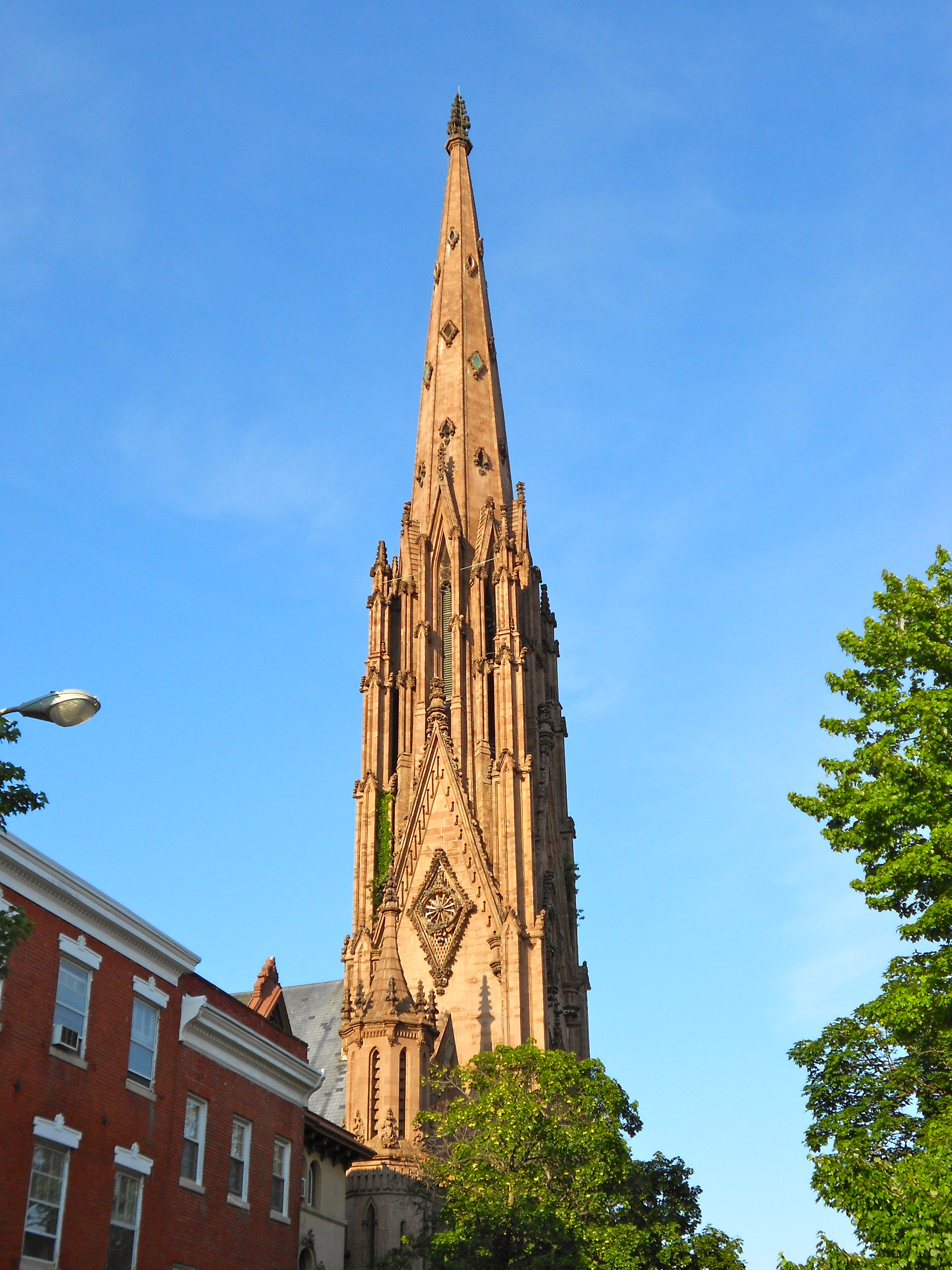

- Location within Baltimore Location within Maryland Location within the United States
- Location: 200--210 W. Madison St., Baltimore, Maryland
- Coordinates: 39°17′55.3″N 76°37′7.4″W
- Area: 1 acre (0.40 ha)
- Built: 1854
- Architect: Lind, E.G.; Starkweather, Norris G.
- Architectural style: Gothic Revival
- NRHP reference No.: 73002186
- Added to NRHP: June 18, 1973

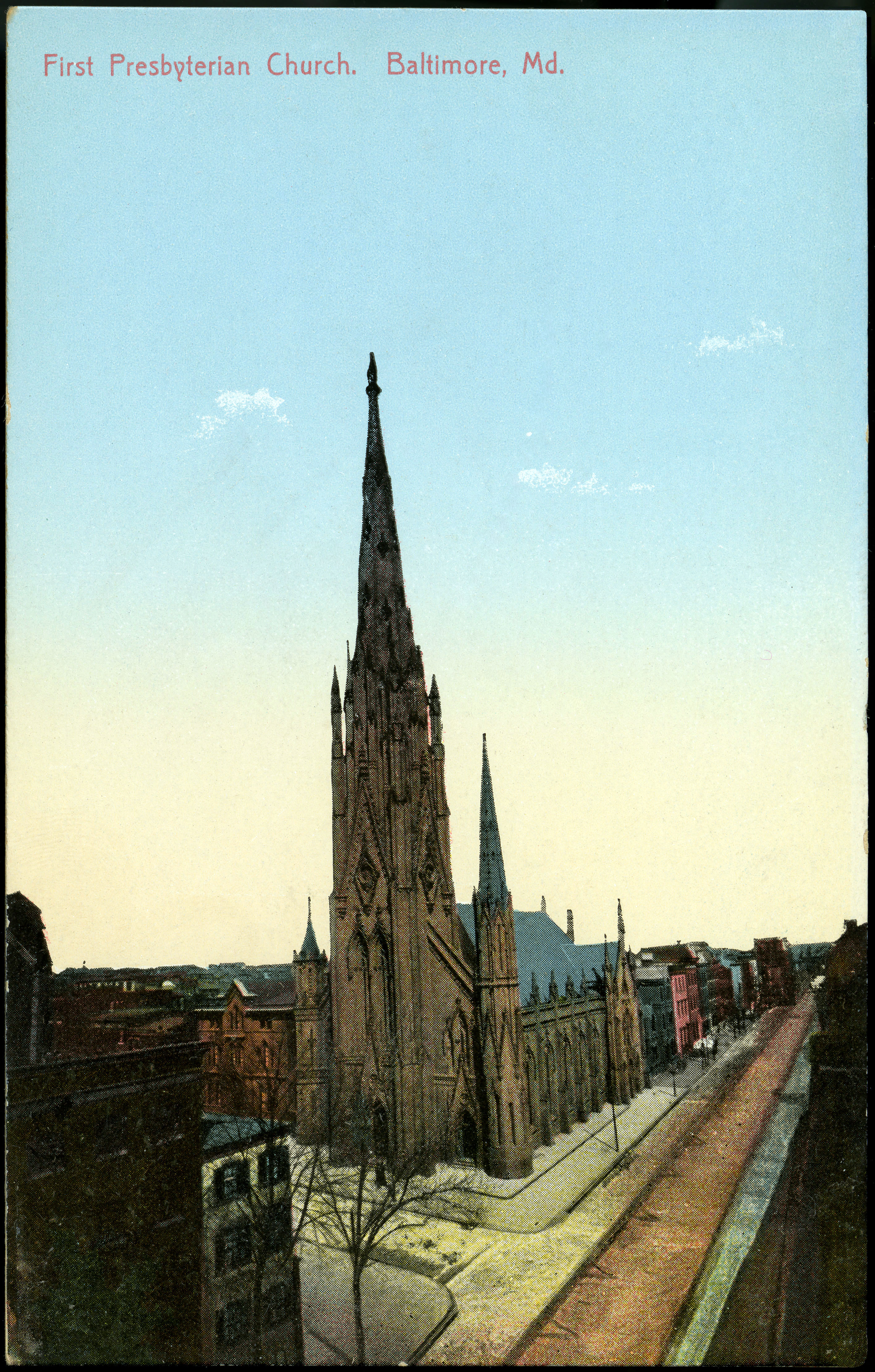
First Presbyterian church in Baltimore, Maryland from a pre-1923 postcard

First Presbyterian Church and Manse is a historic Presbyterian church located at West Madison Street and Park Avenue in the Mount Vernon-Belvedere neighborhood of Baltimore, Maryland, United States. The church is a rectangular brick building with a central tower flanked by protruding octagonal turrets at each corner. At the north end of the church is a two-story building appearing to be a transept and sharing a common roof with the church, but is separated from the auditorium by a bearing wall. The manse is a three-story stone-faced building. The church was begun about 1854 by Norris G. Starkweather and finished by his assistant Edmund G. Lind around 1873. It is a notable example of Gothic Revival architecture and a landmark in the City of Baltimore.

The steeple is the tallest in Baltimore at 273 feet (83 m) and was completed by 1875, supported by clusters of cast iron columns. A subsidiary spire to the right is 125 feet (38 m) high, and the smaller, on the southwest corner, is 78 feet high. Wendel Bollman fabricated much of the ironwork at his Patapsco Bridge and Ironworks. The manse, or rectory, is located to the left, or west of the entrance. The stonework is a red freestone or sandstone from New Brunswick.

First Presbyterian Church and Manse was listed on the National Register of Historic Places in 1973. It is now known as the First and Franklin Presbyterian Church, after merging in 1973 with the former Franklin Street Presbyterian Church several blocks to the south at the northwest corner of West Franklin and Cathedral Streets, across from the central Enoch Pratt Free Library, which was used by the merged congregation for a time and then sold to a fundamentalist Protestant congregation.

First Presbyterian Church is the oldest Presbyterian congregation in Baltimore, founded in 1761, then located after 1763 at East Fayette and North Streets (later Guilford Avenue) on the northwest corner in downtown. The latter was the site for its three succeeding buildings until 1859, when the site was purchased by the Federal Government and a U.S. Courthouse was constructed there. It was instrumental in the establishment of the local Presbytery of Baltimore and many "daughter congregations" such as Second Presbyterian Church and others. It is included in the Baltimore National Heritage Area.

== See also ==
- Franklin Street Presbyterian Church and Parsonage, the reunited sister congregation, also listed on the National Register of Historic Places, no longer occupied by a Presbyterian congregation
