= Cathedral Hill Historic District (Baltimore, Maryland) =

Historic district in Maryland, United States

- U.S. National Register of Historic Places
- U.S. Historic district
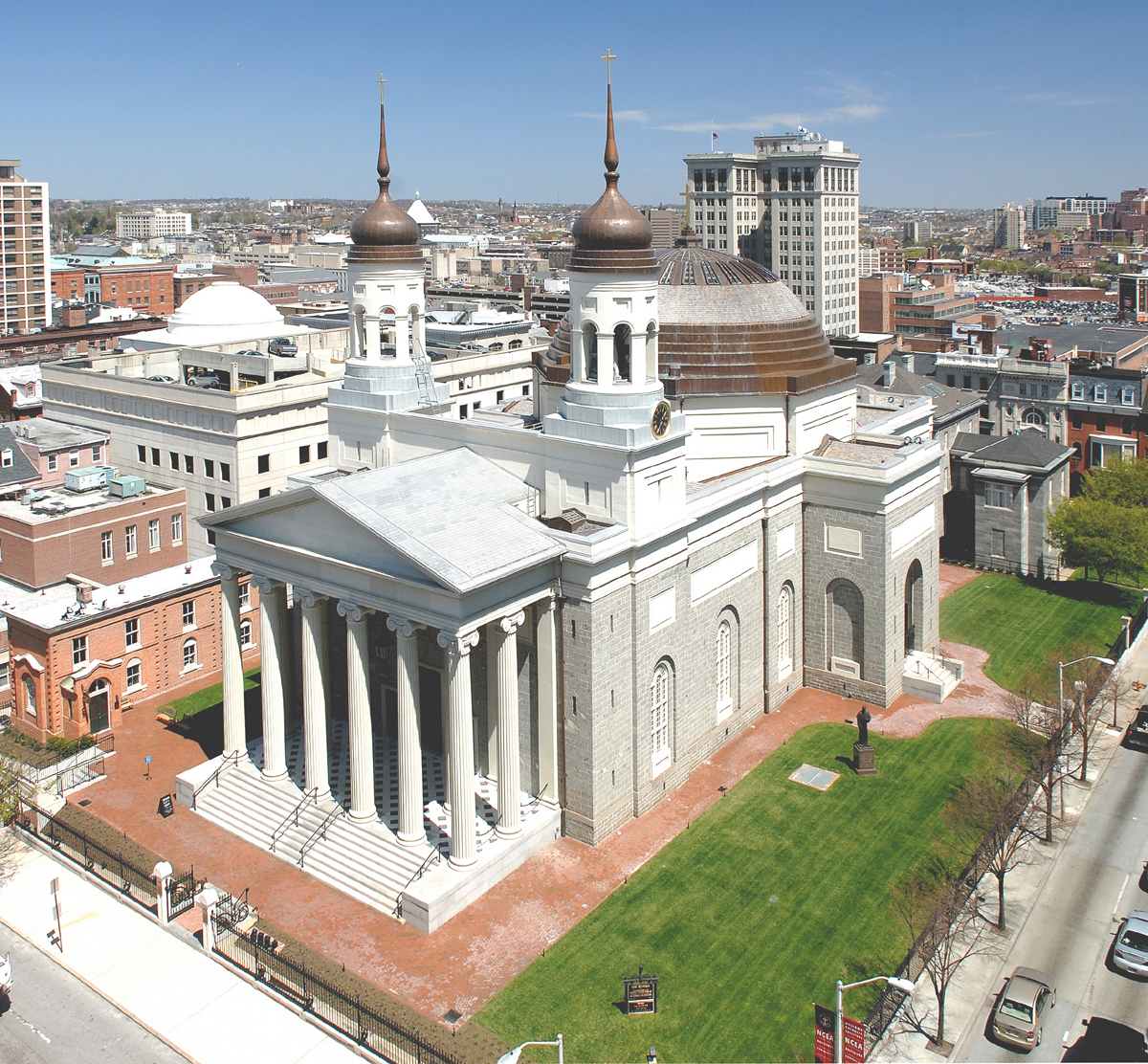
- Basilica of the Assumption

- Location within Baltimore Location within Maryland Location within the United States Location within Maryland
- Location: Baltimore, Maryland
- Coordinates: 39°17′37″N 76°36′58″W
- Area: 23 acres (9.3 ha)
- Architect: Multiple
- Architectural style: Late 19th And 20th Century Revivals, Mid 19th Century Revival, Late Victorian
- NRHP reference No.: 87000622
- Added to NRHP: April 27, 1987

The Cathedral Hill Historic District is an area in Baltimore, Maryland. It lies in the northern part of Downtown just south of Mount Vernon. Roughly bounded by Saratoga Street, Park Avenue, Hamilton Street, and St. Paul Street, these 10 or so blocks contain some of the most significant buildings in Baltimore. The area takes its name from the Basilica of the Assumption which sits in the heart of the district. Despite the number of large religious structures in the area, the district's buildings are primarily commercial in character, with a broad collection of significant commercial structures ranging in date from 1790 to 1940.

Cathedral Hill contains a mix of architectural styles from Georgian of St. Paul's Rectory to Art Deco along Charles Street. The area was added to the National Register of Historic Places in 1987. Cathedral Hill is within Baltimore National Heritage Area.

== Notable buildings ==
- Basilica of the Assumption
- First Unitarian Church
- Franklin Street Presbyterian Church
- Old St. Paul's Episcopal Church
- St. Paul's Rectory

== Images ==
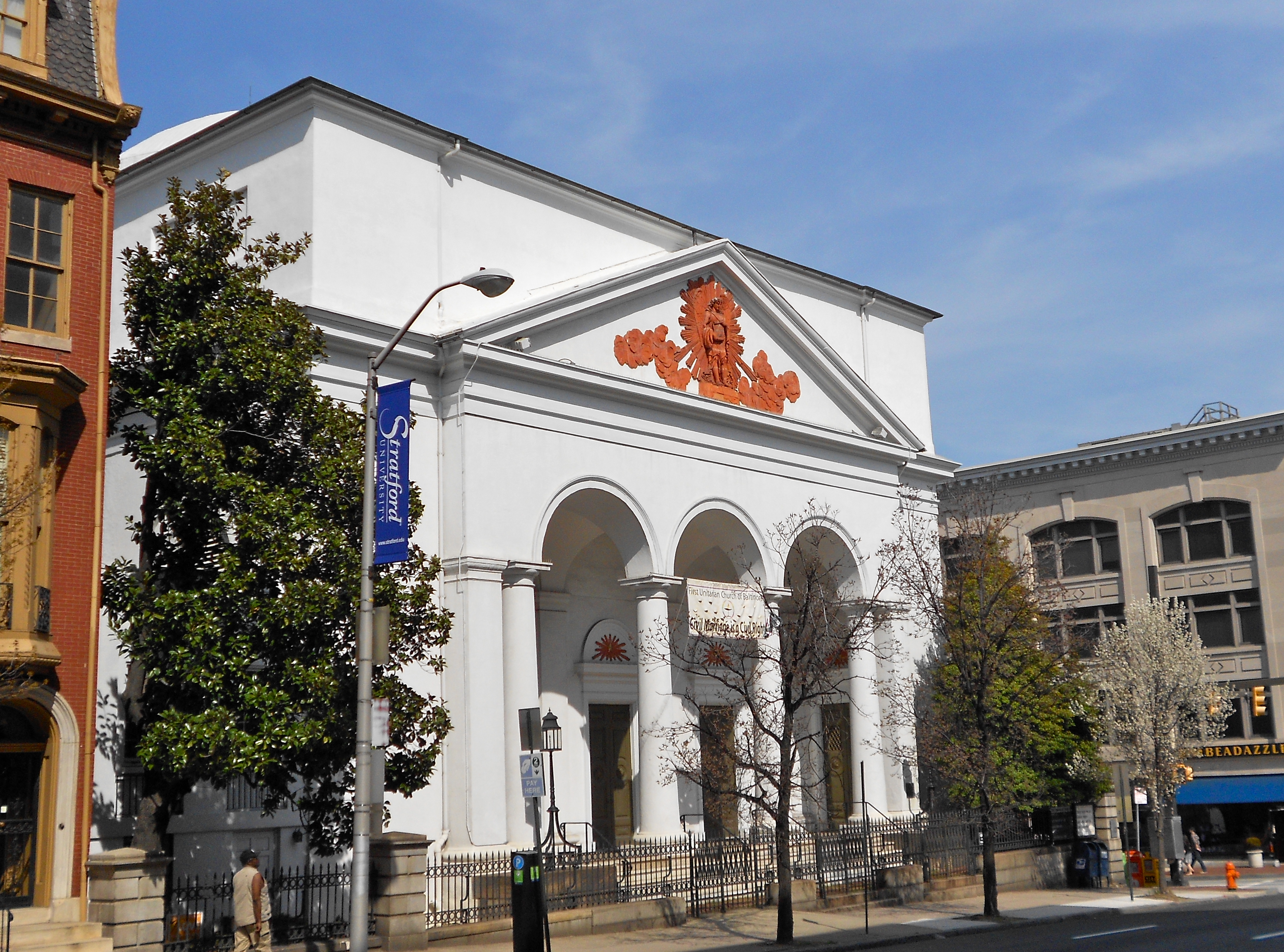
First Unitarian Church

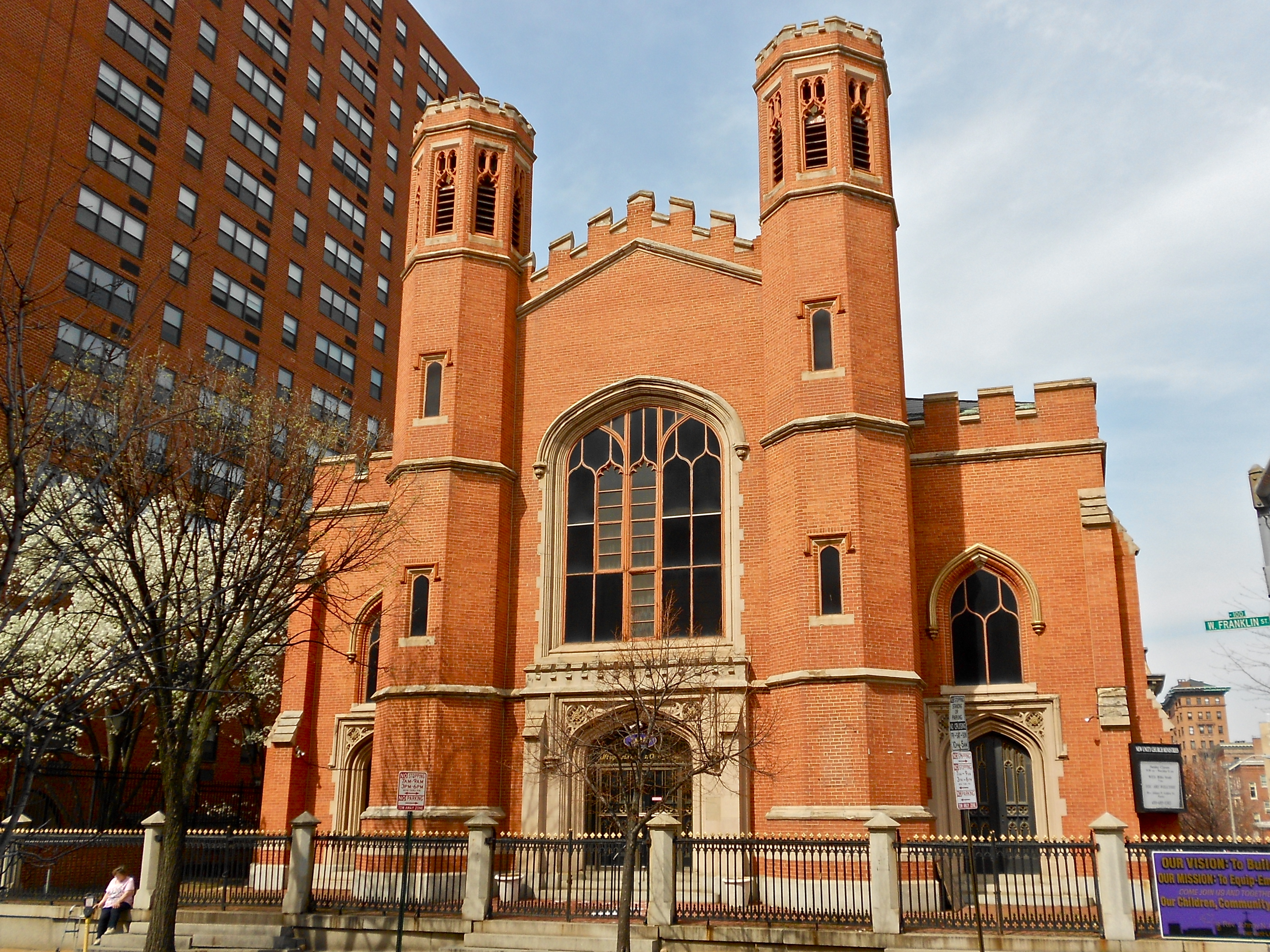
Franklin Street Presbyterian Church

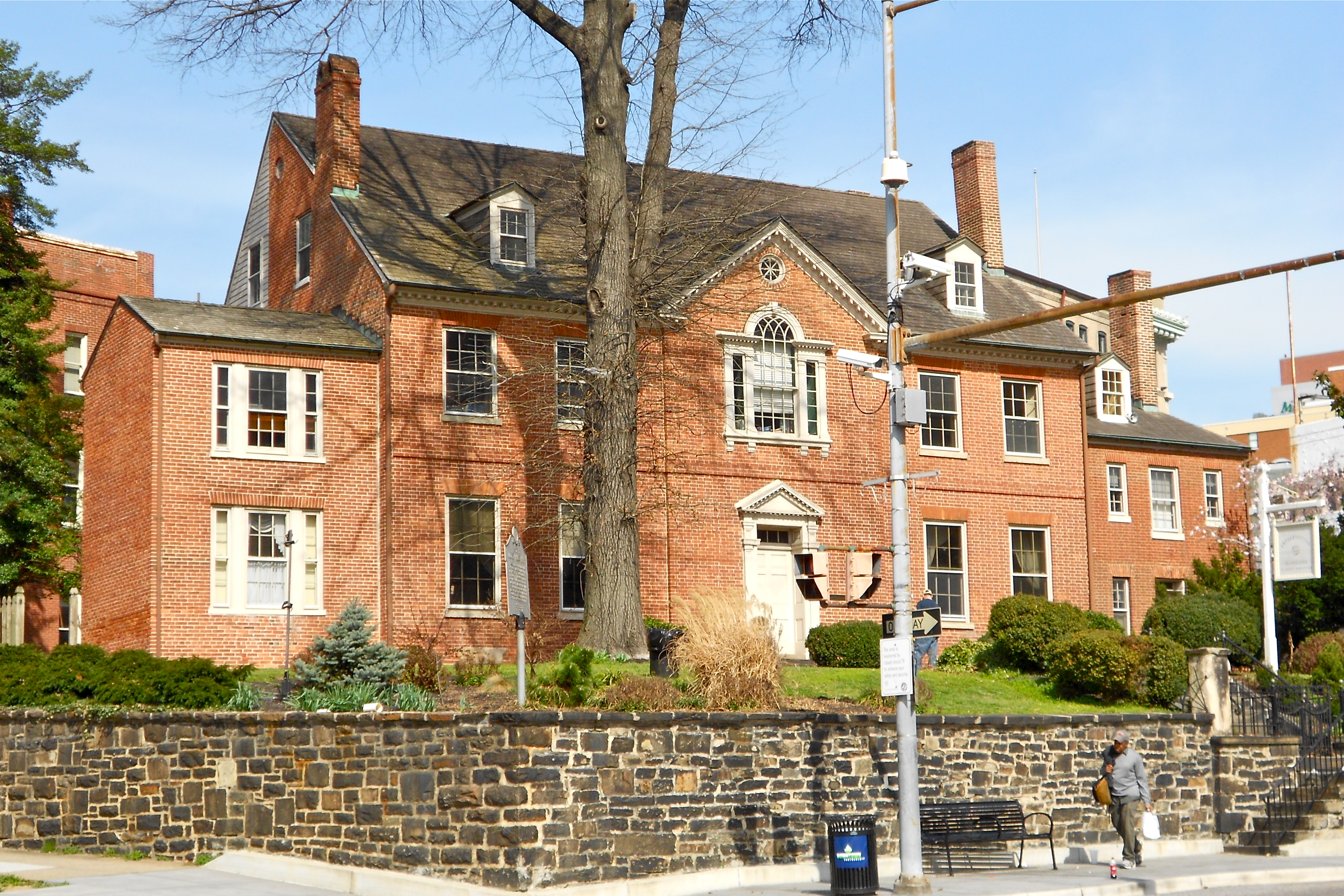
St. Paul's Rectory
