= Jonestown, Baltimore =

Coordinates: 39°17′18″N 76°36′4″W

Jonestown
- Neighborhood of Baltimore
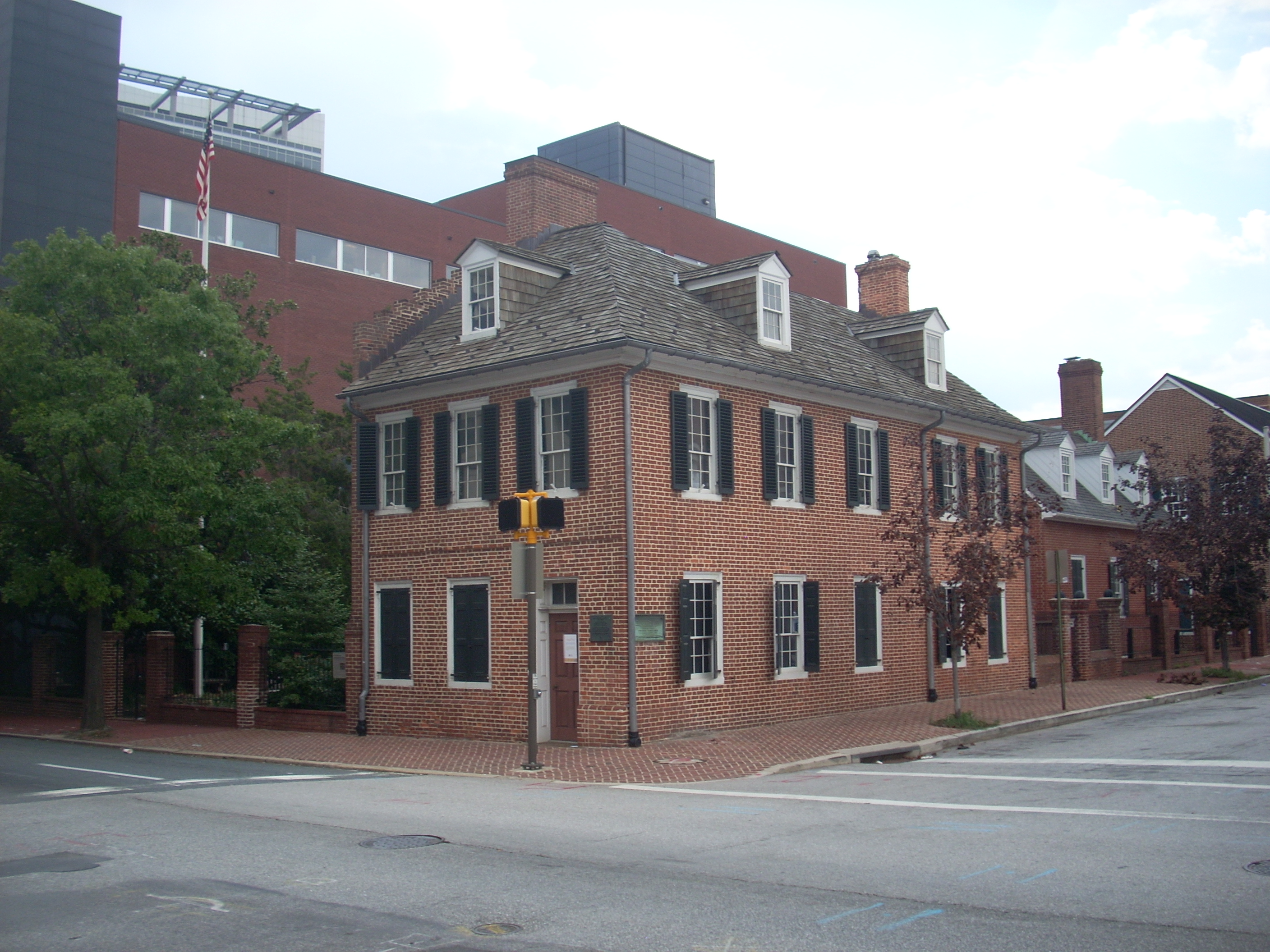
- Flag House on Pratt Street

- Location within Baltimore
- Country: United States
- State: Maryland
- City: Baltimore
- Time zone: UTC-5 (Eastern)
  - Summer (DST): EDT
- ZIP code: 21202
- Area code: 410, 443, and 667

Jonestown is a neighborhood in the southeastern district of Baltimore. Established in 1732, three years after Baltimore was incorporated in 1729, it is one of the oldest places in the city. The boundaries of Jonestown have fluctuated over the years, and currently, they are defined by the north side of Pratt Street, the west side of Central Avenue, the east side of Fallsway, and the south side of Orleans Street. The district is a mix of industrial, commercial, and residential.

Established in the Colonial era as "Jones Town", it was founded by David Jones, a Welsh miller who owned a gristmill and the surrounding land. In 1745, Jones's Town officially merged with the adjacent Baltimore Town, forming the basis for the modern city of Baltimore. The area is often referred to as being part of "Old Town". Throughout the late 18th and 19th centuries, Jonestown was the destination for a large population of German immigrants. They established institutions in the area, including the Zion Lutheran Church. Beginning in the mid-19th century, Jonestown became the heart of Baltimore's Jewish community. This is marked by the construction of the Lloyd Street Synagogue in 1845, the third-oldest synagogue in the United States. The neighborhood was a first home for thousands of Jewish immigrants, initially from Germany and later from Eastern Europe. Today the Jewish Museum of Maryland is located here, representing not only Baltimore but the entire state.

In the last half of the 20th century, Jonestown shifted, like much of East and West Baltimore, into a predominantly African-American neighborhood. In the second half of the 20th century, public housing replaced many former rowhouses and townhouses. During the 21st century, modern housing began replacing older public housing.

Indicative of its age, Jonestown is home to some of Baltimore's oldest religious buildings. These include the Old Town Friends' Meetinghouse, the oldest religious building in Baltimore; St. Vincent de Paul Church, the city's oldest Catholic parish in continuous use; and the Lloyd Street Synagogue, the oldest in the city and the third-oldest synagogue in the country. It is also home to several Baltimore City landmarks, such as the central post office, the Flag House, the Reginald F. Lewis Museum, the Carroll Mansion, the Phoenix Shot Tower, The House at 9 North Front Street, the former Hendler Creamery factory (1892-2024), and McKim's School.

== Government and infrastructure ==
The United States Postal Service operates the Baltimore Main Post Office at 900 East Fayette Street.
