= Lloyd Street Synagogue =

Historical former Reform synagogue in Baltimore, Maryland, United States

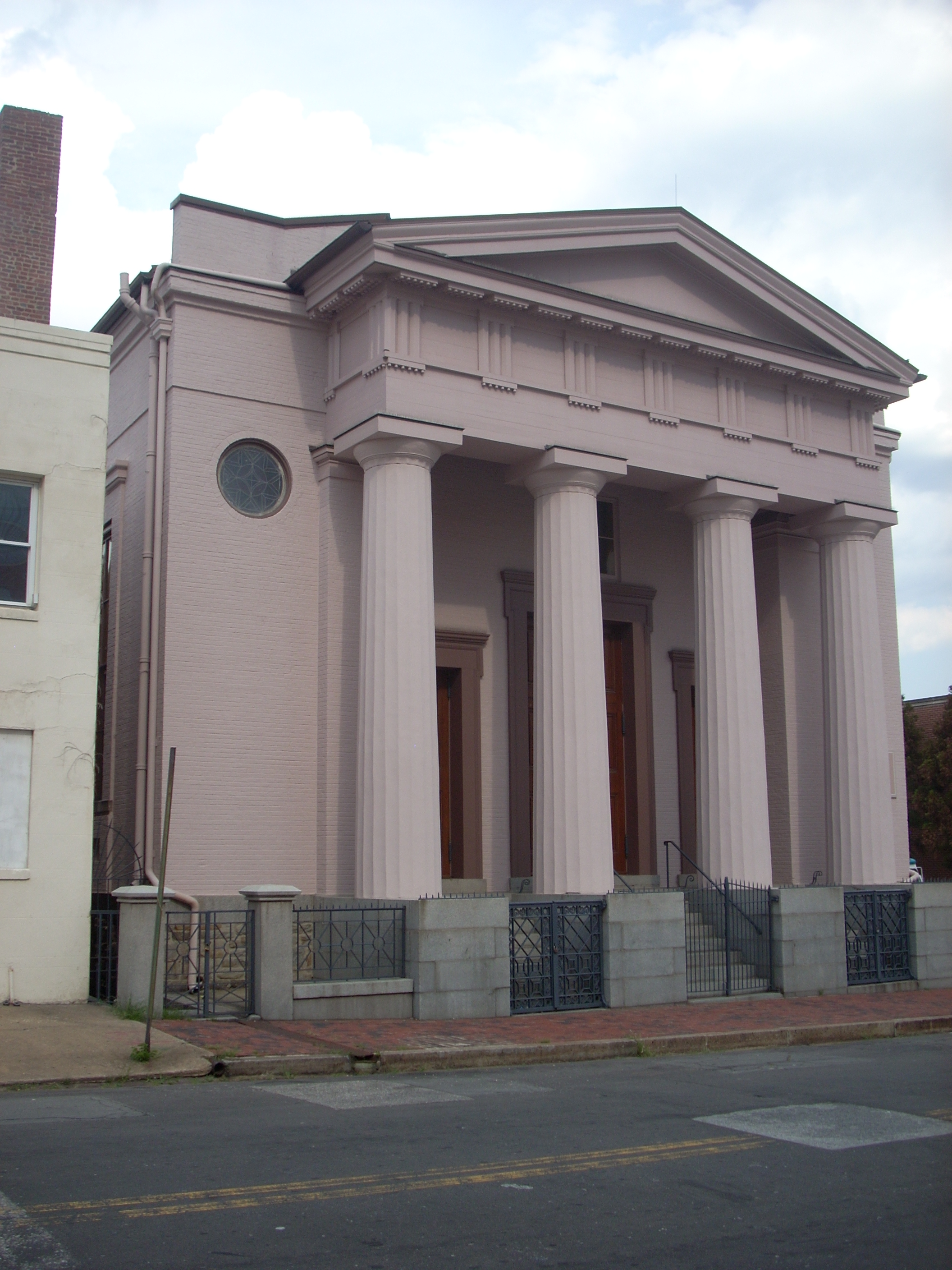
- Former Lloyd Street Synagogue

- Location of the former synagogue, now museum, in Baltimore, Maryland

Religion
- Affiliation: Reform Judaism (former); Orthodox Judaism (former)
- Ecclesiastical or organisational status: Synagogue (1885–1889); Church (1889–1905); Synagogue (1905–1963); Jewish museum (since 1963)
- Ownership: Jewish Museum of Maryland
- Status: Closed (as a synagogue); Repurposed (as a museum)

Location
- Location: 11 Lloyd Street, Baltimore, Maryland
- Country: United States
- Coordinates: 39°17′25.7″N 76°36′4.5″W

Architecture
- Architects: Robert Cary Long, Jr.; William Reasin
- Type: Synagogue
- Style: Greek Revival
- General contractor: Messrs Curly and Sons
- Established: 1830 (as a congregation)
- Completed: 1845
- Construction cost: $20,000
- Materials: Brick
- Lloyd Street Synagogue
- U.S. National Register of Historic Places
- Baltimore City Landmark
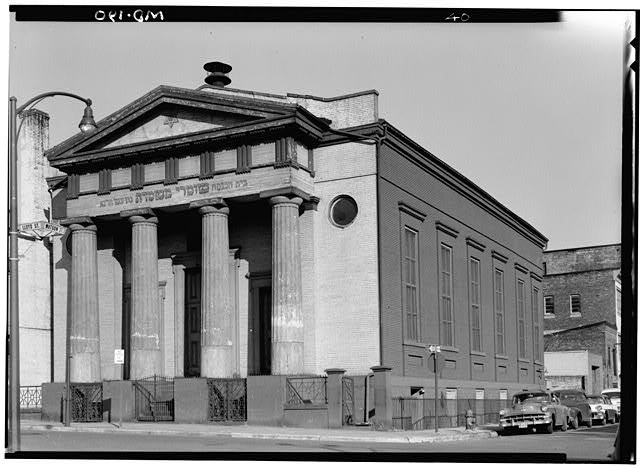
- The former synagogue in 1958
- Area: less than one acre
- NRHP reference No.: 78003142

Significant dates
- Added to NRHP: April 19, 1978
- Designated BCL: 1971

The Lloyd Street Synagogue is a Reform and Orthodox Jewish former synagogue located on Lloyd Street, Baltimore, Maryland, in the United States. The Greek Revival-style building is the fifth oldest synagogue building in the United States and was the first synagogue building erected in Maryland. The building was listed on the National Register of Historic Places in 1978 and designated as a Baltimore City Landmark in 1971.

The Lloyd Street former synagogue building is now owned by the Jewish Museum of Maryland and is open to the public as a museum in the Inner Harbor area of Baltimore.

== History ==
The Lloyd Street Synagogue was built by the Baltimore Hebrew Congregation, incorporated on January 29, 1830, as Nidche Yisroel. For the first fifteen years of its existence, services were held in a small room above a local grocery store. The Lloyd Street synagogue was dedicated by the Rev. S. M. Isaacs of New York and the Rev. Isaac Leeser of Philadelphia, together with the ministers of the congregation, Abraham Rice and A. Ansell (Anshel). The first siddur (prayer book) used by the synagogue was an 1838 siddur written by Wolf Heidenheim in both Old German and Hebrew.

In 1889, the building was sold to The St. John the Baptist Roman Catholic Church, a parish that served mainly immigrants from Lithuania, which used the building until 1905. In 1905, it was sold to congregation Shomrei Mishmeres HaKodesh, an Orthodox Jewish congregation of immigrants from Eastern Europe, which continued to use the building until 1963, when the building was threatened with demolition. The effort to preserve Lloyd Street was the impetus for the founding of the Jewish Historical Society of Maryland, now the Jewish Museum of Maryland.

Baltimore architects Robert Cary Long, Jr. and William Reasin designed the building in the fashionable Greek Revival style. Four doric columns support a classic pediment, all painted light pink. The body of the building is brick. The building is a near-twin of St. Peter the Apostle Church, designed by Long in 1842.

Lloyd Street Synagogue is the third oldest synagogue building in the United States (several earlier buildings are no longer standing). The two oldest synagogue buildings, both in active use, are the Touro Synagogue in Newport, Rhode Island and Kahal Kadosh Beth Elohim Synagogue, in Charleston, South Carolina.

The building was designated as a Baltimore City Landmark in 1971, was listed on the National Register of Historic Places in 1978, and lies within the Baltimore National Heritage Area.

In 2011, archaeologists uncovered a mikveh under the synagogue. It is believed to be the oldest known mikveh in the United States.

== See also ==
- Baltimore Hebrew Congregation Synagogue
- History of the Jews in Baltimore
- Jewish Museum of Maryland
- Oldest synagogues in the United States
