= Franklin Street Presbyterian Church and Parsonage =

Historic church in Maryland, US

- U.S. National Register of Historic Places
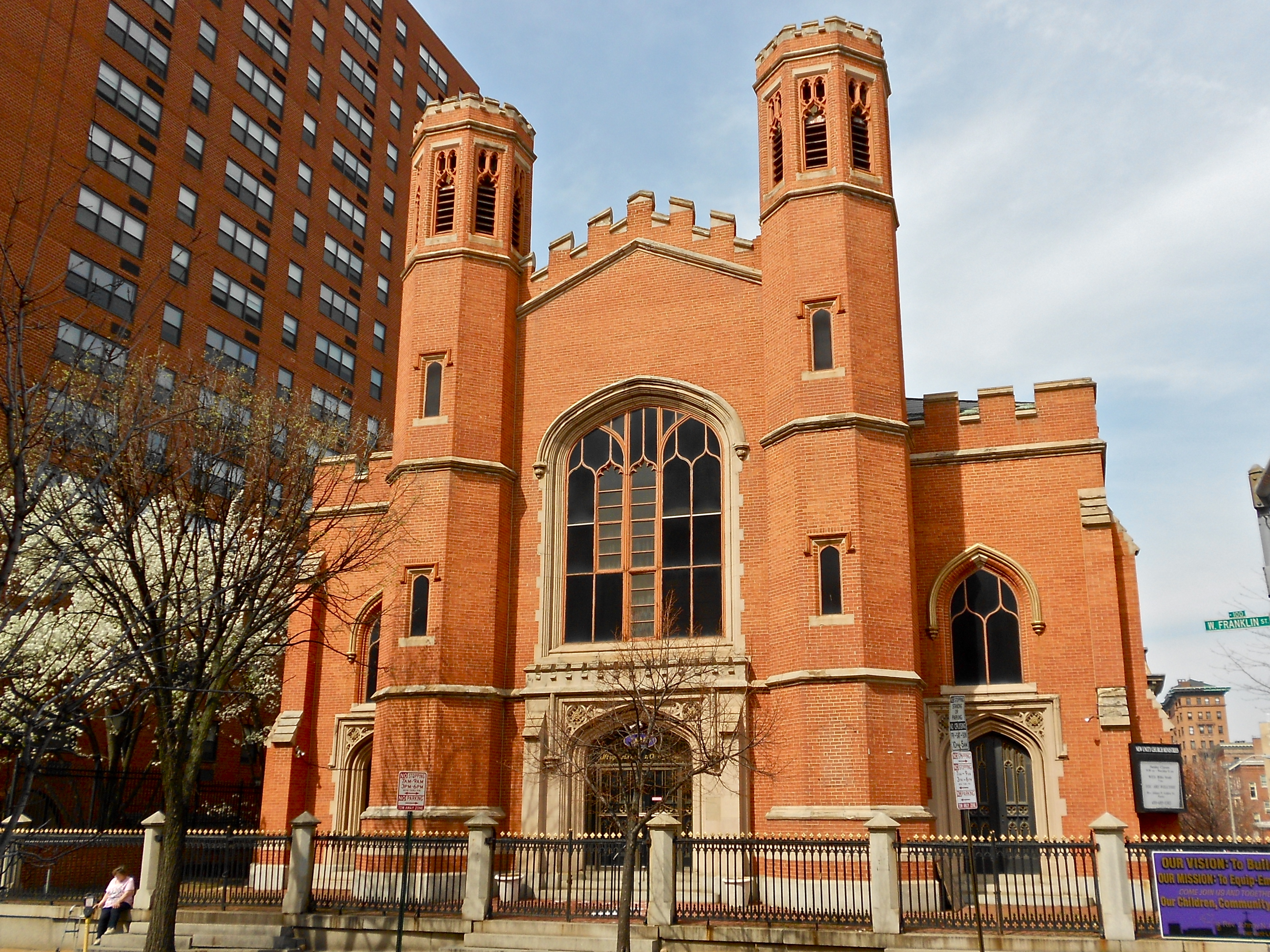
- Franklin Street Presbyterian Church, March 2012

- Location within Baltimore Location within Maryland Location within the United States
- Location: 100 W. Franklin St. (church), 504 Cathedral St. (parsonage), Baltimore, Maryland
- Coordinates: 39°17′43″N 76°37′2″W
- Area: 0.3 acres (0.12 ha)
- Built: 1847
- Architect: Long, Robert Cary, Jr. (church); Col. R. Snowden Andrews (parsonage)
- Architectural style: Gothic Revival, Tudor Gothic Revival
- NRHP reference No.: 71001036
- Added to NRHP: November 5, 1971

Franklin Street Presbyterian Church and Parsonage is a historic Presbyterian church located at 100 West Franklin Street at Cathedral Street, northwest corner in Baltimore, Maryland, United States. The church is a rectangular Tudor Gothic building dedicated in 1847, with an addition in 1865. The front features two 60 foot flanking octagonal towers are also crenelated and have louvered belfry openings and stained glass Gothic-arched windows. The manse / parsonage at the north end has similar matching walls of brick, heavy Tudor-Gothic window hoods, and battlements atop the roof and was built in 1857.

This church was incorporated in 1844 by a group of men from the First Presbyterian Church then located at the northwest corner of East Fayette Street and North Street (now Guilford Avenue) in downtown (later relocated in 1854 to West Madison Street and Park Avenue in Mount Vernon-Belvedere neighborhood after selling their previous third church building of 1790-95 to the Federal Government which built a U.S. Courthouse there [to 1889, replaced again 1932] dedicated in 1860 by 16th President James Buchanan). They felt the need for a new church in that fast-growing northern section of the city formerly "Howard's Woods" of Col. John Eager Howard's (Revolutionary War commander of the famed "Maryland Line" regiment of the Continental Army) country estate "Belvidere" (mansion located at intersection of North Calvert and East Chase Streets, razed 1875) where the Washington Monument was erected with its four surrounding park squares just two blocks from their new building.

Franklin Street Church was also located on "Cathedral Hill" in the southern part of the community bordering downtown Baltimore to the south and across the street from the old Baltimore Cathedral (Basilica of the National Shrine of the Assumption of the Blessed Virgin Mary) of the Roman Catholic Archdiocese of Baltimore, erected 1806-1821 and designed by Benjamin Latrobe - first Catholic cathedral constructed in America. Later in 1882–1886, philanthropist Enoch Pratt founded his central library for the new Enoch Pratt Free Library then facing West Mulberry Street at Cathedral, a block further south which was replaced in 1931-33 by a new central library building facing Cathedral Street and encompassing the entire block and now directly across Franklin Street from the F.S.P.C.

In 1973, the two historic downtown area congregations reunited to form The First and Franklin Street Presbyterian Church and was centered at the First Church site on West Madison and Park. The Franklin Street building was used by the merged congregation for a time and then sold to a fundamentalist independent Protestant congregation and later re-sold to the present "New Unity Church Ministries".

Across Cathedral Street to the northeast was the 1820s era Greek Revival style home with large front columns, designed by Robert Mills (who also did the iconic landmark Washington Monument two blocks away) which later was occupied by the original Maryland Club, an exclusive Southern-leaning dining and leisure society of gentlemen, founded 1857 that was once threatened by Massachusetts State Militia commander, Gen. Benjamin F. Butler, U.S.A. when he occupied Baltimore on May 13, 1861, a month after the infamous "Pratt Street Riots", when mobs of Southern sympathizing Baltimoreans attacked passing state militia from Massachusetts and Pennsylvania at the beginning of the Civil War on Thursday/Friday, April 18-19th. General Butler's troops fortified Federal Hill with a battery redoubt named Fort Federal Hill and with numerous cannons overlooking the harbor basin (later renamed "Inner Harbor" in the 1960s) and surrounding city, "to put a shot into it" if he spied a reputed rebel flag flying or any discontent to the Union Army declared martial law. The Club later moved a few city blocks further north to North Charles and East Eager Streets in 1892 and the Cathedral and Franklin mansion was later replaced in 1907-08 by the former Central Building of the Young Men's Christian Association of Central Maryland (YMCA) which was closed in 1984 and the building renovated as the Mount Vernon Hotel and Café, and again subsequently as the Hotel Indigo in 2017.

The church is no longer used by a Presbyterian congregation and is currently occupied since the 1970s by the New Unity Church Ministries / New Unity Baptist Church, with Pastor Johnny N. Golden, sr. John Gresham Machen, the founder of Westminster Seminary of the Presbyterians, attended the church as a child.

The church and manse / parsonage in the rear (at 502 Cathedral Street, at southwest corner with West Hamilton Street [alley]) were listed on the National Register of Historic Places on November 5, 1971. They are included within the Cathedral Hill Historic District and the Baltimore National Heritage Area and in the Mount_Vernon-Belvedere neighborhood.

== See also ==
- First Presbyterian Church and Manse (Baltimore, Maryland), the reunited sister congregation, is also listed on the National Register of Historic Places
