= Baltimore City Landmarks =

Landmarks program in Baltimore, Maryland, US

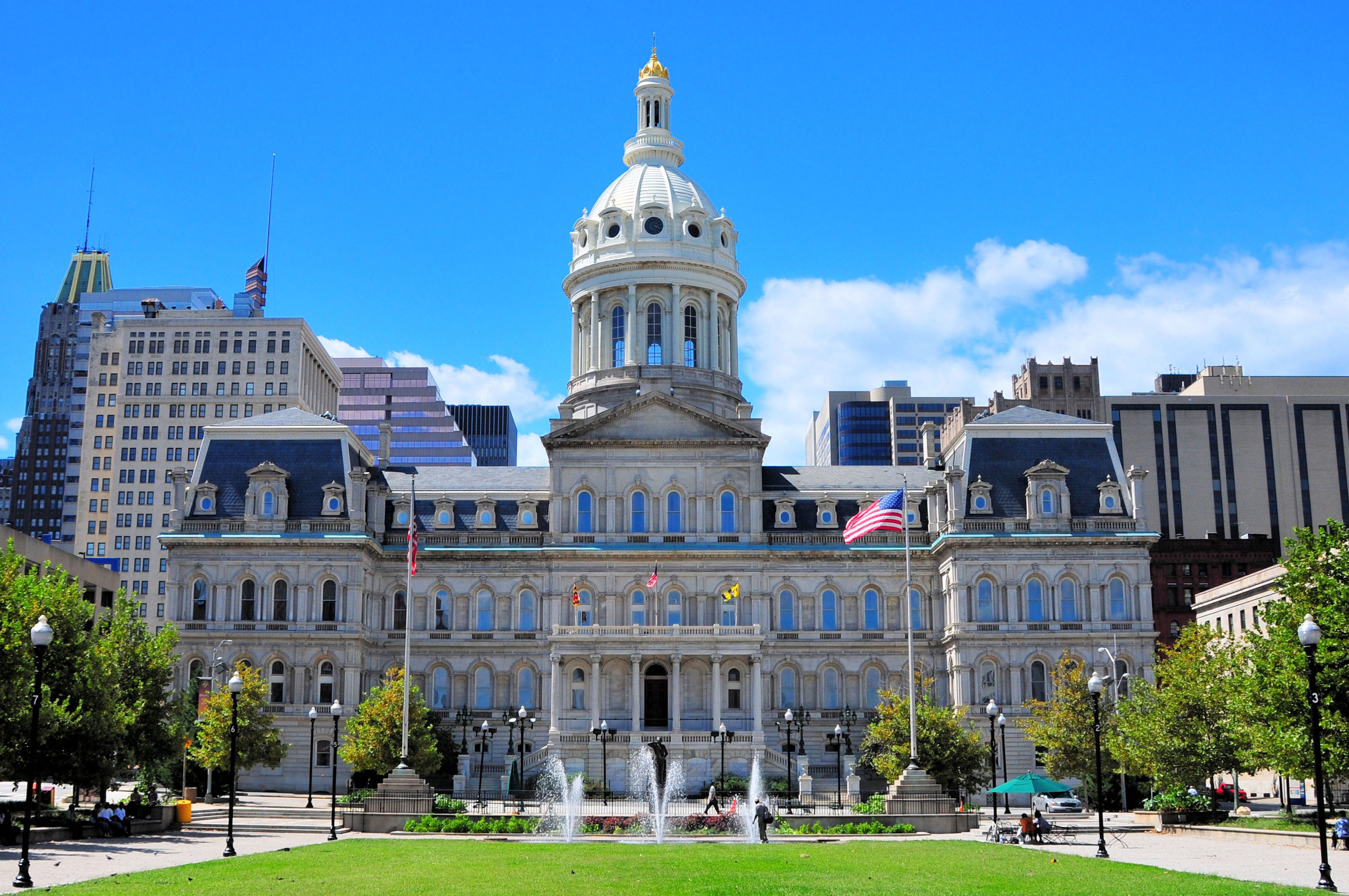
Baltimore City Hall, the first Baltimore City Landmark

Baltimore City Landmark is a historic property designation made by the city of Baltimore, Maryland. Nominations are reviewed by the city's Commission for Historical & Architectural Preservation (CHAP) and planning board, and are passed by Baltimore City Council. The landmarks program was created in 1971.

CHAP also maintains a list of Historical and Architectural Preservation Districts, separate from its landmarks program. The district program includes 37 unique districts, many of which are also listed on the National Register of Historic Places.

As of 2012, the program had designated 163 exterior Baltimore City Landmarks and one interior landmark (for the interior of the Senator Theatre, whose exterior is also landmarked).

Also as of 2012, more than 56,000 properties were located in 24 city historic districts, receiving the same protection as individual Baltimore City Landmarks.

== Criteria ==
In assessing landmarks, the city Commission for Historical & Architectural Preservation (CHAP) developed criteria based on the National Register Criteria for Evaluation. The city commission looks at:

- Significance to Baltimore history or historical events
- Association with people significant to Baltimore's history
  - Providing or being likely to provide important information to Baltimore prehistory or history
- The architecture, culture, engineering, or archaeology involved in the site
  - Having distinct characteristics of a type, period, or method of construction
- Integrity of location, design, materials, craftsmanship, feeling, or association
  - Having high artistic value or being part of a distinguishable entity
  - Representing the work of a skilled or notable artist, architect, or other worker

== Landmarks ==
Map

For consistency, the list below uses the name used in the Baltimore City Landmark List.

Listing no.	Property name	Location	Ordinance no.	Year listed	Landmark report
1	City Hall	100 N. Holliday Street; 39.29094°N 76.61076°W	71-974	1971	
2	Otterbein Evangelical United Brethren Church	112 W. Conway Street; 39.28451°N 76.61724°W	71-974	1971	
3	McKim Free School	1120 E. Baltimore Street; 39.29126°N 76.60113°W	71-974	1971	
4	First Unitarian Church	2-12 W. Franklin Street; 39.295278°N 76.616111°W	71-974	1971	
5	Ebenezer African Methodist Episcopal Church	18 and 20-30 W. Montgomery Street; 39.28008°N 76.61532°W	71-974	1971	
6	Peale Museum (Municipal Museum of Baltimore)	225 N. Holliday Street; 39.291914°N 76.610633°W	71-974	1971	
7	Carroll Mansion Complex	33 S. Front Street; 39.288556°N 76.604444°W	71-974; 02-396	1971; 2002	
8	Lovely Lane Methodist Church	2200 St. Paul Street; 39.314444°N 76.615833°W	71-974	1971	
9	Lloyd Street Synagogue	11 Lloyd Street; 39.29047°N 76.60125°W	71-974	1971	
10	Bethel A.M.E. Church	1300 Druid Hill Avenue; 39.30201°N 76.628891°W	71-974	1971	
11	Eutaw Place Baptist Church	327 Dolphin Street; 39.30308°N 76.62469°W	71-974	1971	
12	Eastern Female High School	249 Aisquith Street; 39.2945°N 76.6014°W	71-974	1971	
13	Belvedere Hotel	1 E. Chase Street; 39.30222°N 76.61611°W	75-1001	1975	
14	Battle Monument	Calvert Street, north of intersection with Fayette Street; 39.290694°N 76.612417°W	75-1001	1975	
15	St. Paul's P.E. Church	233 N. Charles Street; 39.291944°N 76.615000°W	75-1001	1975	
16	St. Paul's P.E. Church Rectory	24 W. Saratoga Street; 39.292778°N 76.615833°W	75-1001	1975	
17	Cylburn House	4915 Greenspring Ave; 39.352500°N 76.652778°W	75-1001	1975	
18	Davidge Hall	522 W. Lombard Street; 39.28778°N 76.62315°W	75-1001	1975	
19	Mt. Clare Station & Roundhouse	901 W. Pratt Street; 39.285394°N 76.632397°W	75-1001	1975	
20	Evergreen House	4545 N. Charles Street; 39.348333°N 76.621111°W	75-1001	1975	
21	Old Post Office Building	111 N. Calvert Street	75-1001	1975	
22	Homewood House	3400 N. Charles Street	75-1001	1975	
23	Certain structures in Druid Hill Park	Druid Hill Park	75-1001	1975	
24	Baltimore Arts Tower (Bromo Seltzer Tower)	21 S. Eutaw Street	75-1001	1975	
25	Mercantile Safe Deposit and Trust Building	202 E. Redwood Street	75-1001	1975	
26	Star Spangled Banner Flag House	844 E. Pratt Street	75-1001	1975	
27	Peabody Institute	1-21 E. Mount Vernon Place	75-1001	1975	
28	Old Town Friends’ Meeting House	1201 E. Fayette Street	75-1001	1975	
29	Mother Seton House	600 N. Paca Street	75-1001	1975	
30	Washington Monument and Mount Vernon Place	Charles Street at Mount Vernon Place	75-1001	1975	
31	Westminster Presbyterian Church	509-513 W. Fayette Street	75-1001	1975	
32	Basilica of the Assumption	409 Cathedral Street	75-1001	1975	
33	H. L. Mencken House	1524 Hollins Street	75-1001	1975	
34	Shot Tower	801 E. Fayette Street	75-1001	1975	
35	Engine House No. 6	416 N. Gay Street	75-1001	1975	
36	St. Vincent de Paul Church	120 N. Front Street	75-1001	1975	
37	Old Cathedral School	7-9 W. Mulberry Street; 39.293992°N 76.616135°W	75-1001	1975	
38	Edgar Allan Poe House	203 N. Amity Street; 39.29129°N 76.63310°W	75-1001	1975; 1982	
39	Thomas-Jencks-Gladding House	1 W. Mount Vernon Place; 39.297197°N 76.616023°W	75-1001	1975	
40	Clifton Mansion	2701 St. Lo Drive	75-1001	1975	
41	Roland Park Shopping Center	4800 Roland Avenue	75-1001	1975	
42	St. Mary’s Seminary Chapel	600 N. Paca Street	75-1001	1975	
43	B’Nai Israel Synagogue	27-35 Lloyd Street; 39.290°N 76.601°W	77-331	1977	
44	First Baptist Church	525 N. Caroline Street	77-331	1977	
45	Sharon Baptist Church	1373 N. Stricker Street	77-331	1977	
46	Taylor’s Chapel & Burial Ground	6001 Hillen Road	77-331	1977	
47	Zion Lutheran Church & Parish House	400 E. Lexington Street	77-331	1977	
48	Furness House	19-21 South Street	77-331	1977	
49	Goucher House	2313 St. Paul Street	77-331	1977	
50	United States Customs House	40 S. Gay Street	77-331	1977	
51	Pennsylvania Station	1525 N. Charles Street	77-331	1977	
52	Ascot House	104 W. 39th Street	77-331	1977	
53	Babe Ruth House	216 Emory Street	77-331	1977	
54	War Memorial	101 N. Gay Street	77-331	1977	
55	Alexander Brown and Sons	135 E. Baltimore Street	82-829	1982	Report
56	Baltimore City Courthouse	100 N. Calvert Street	82-829	1982	
57	Carroll Hunting Lodge	5914 Greenspring Avenue	82-829	1982	Report
58	Continental Building	201 E. Baltimore Street	82-829	1982	
59	Crimea House, Chapel, and Stables	1901 Eagle Drive, Leakin Park	82-829	1982	Report
60	Etting Cemetery	1500 block, north side of W. North Avenue	82-829	1982	
61	Gallagher Mansion	431 Notre Dame Lane	82-829	1982	
62	Greenmount Cemetery Chapel and Gates	1501 Greenmount Avenue	82-829	1982	Report
63	James Lawrence Kernan Hospital	2200 N. Forest Park Avenue	82-829	1982	Report
64	Leadenhall Baptist Church	1021 Leadenhall Street	82-829	1982	Report
65	Mount Clare Mansion	1500 Washington Boulevard	82-829	1982	Report
66	Mount Royal Station and Shed	1400 Cathedral Street	82-829	1982	
67	New Psalmist Baptist Church and Parsonage	100 W. Franklin Street	82-829	1982	
68	Patterson Park Observatory	27 S. Patterson Park Avenue, Patterson Park	82-829	1982	Report
69	Saint Frances Academy	501 E. Chase Street	82-829	1982	
70	Saint Leo's Church	225 S. Exeter Street	82-829	1982	Report
71	Saint Peter Claver Church	1542 N. Fremont Avenue	82-829	1982	Report
72	Sharp Street United Methodist Church	508 Dolphin Street	82-829	1982	Report
73	Fort McHenry	1401 Constellation Plaza	86-851	1986	Report
74	G. Krug and Sons	415-417 W. Saratoga Street	86-851	1986	Report
75	Hutzler’s Palace Building	210-218 N. Howard Street	86-851	1986	
76	Mount Washington Octagon (U.S.F.&G.) Building	5801 Smith Avenue	86-851	1986	Report
77	Mount Auburn Cemetery	2614 Annapolis Road	86-851	1986	Report
78	Booker T. Washington Jr. Middle School No. 130	1301 McCulloh Avenue	86-851	1986	
79	Walters Bath House and Engine House#10	906 Washington Boulevard	86-851; 02-315	1986; 2002	Report
80	Warden’s House (Baltimore City Jail)	400 E. Madison Street	86-851	1986	Report
81	Robert Long House	810 - 812 S. Ann Street	86-851	1986	
82	Greenway Cottages	818, 822 and 826 W. 40th Street	86-851	1986	
83	1124 Riverside Avenue	1124 Riverside Avenue	86-851	1986	
84	Provident Bank Building (Provident Bank of Maryland)	240 N. Howard Street	86-851	1986	Report
85	Southern Hotel	7-11 Light Street	86-851	1986	
86	Macht Building	11-13 E. Fayette Street	86-851	1986	Report
87	Old Federal Reserve Bank (now headquarters for Provident Bank of Maryland)	114-120 E. Lexington Street	86-851	1986	
88	Chamber of Commerce Building	17 Commerce Street	86-851	1986	Report
89	Old Saint Paul's Cemetery	733 W. Redwood Street	86-851	1986	Report
90	Wooden houses	612-614 S. Wolfe Street	87-1157	1987	Report
91	Pascault Row	651-665 W. Lexington Street	87-1157	1987	Report
92	Baltimore Museum of Art	10 Art Museum Drive	87-1157	1987	
93	Hutzler’s Tower Building	222 N. Howard Street	87-1157	1987	
94	Gilman Hall, Johns Hopkins University	3400 N. Charles Street	87-1157	1987	
95	D’Alesandro House	245 Albemarle Street	87-1157	1987	
96	St. Joseph’s Monastery	3800 Frederick Avenue	91-727	1991	
97	Orchard Street Church	510 Orchard Street	93-223	1993	
98	Douglas Memorial Community Church	1325 Madison Avenue	95-661	1995	
99	Buena Vista	1705 N. Longwood Street	98-256	1998	
100	George Howard House	8 E. Madison Street; 39.298969°N 76.615054°W	98-257	1998	
101	Charles Theater	1711-1717 N. Charles Street	98-272	1998	
102	St. Katherine of Alexandria Protestant Episcopal Church	2001 Division Street	98-349	1998	
103	Hecht Company Building	118 N. Howard Street	99-394	1999	
104	Congress Hotel	306-312 W. Franklin Street	99-511	1999	
105	Carlton Street Arab Stables	112 S. Carlton Street	99-580	1999	
106	Patterson Theater	3136 Eastern Avenue	99-582	1999	Report
107	Standard Oil Building	501 St. Paul Street	99-583	1999	
108	Friends Burial Ground	2506 Harford Road	99-583	1999	Report
109	Northern District Police Station	3355 Keswick Road	00-27	2000	Report
110	Samuel Coleridge Taylor Elementary School#122	501 W. Preston Street	00-28	2000	Report
111	Grace Hampden Methodist Church	1014 W. 36th Street	00-111	2000	
112	DuVal/Hirschhorn House	800 W. Lake Avenue	01-182	2001	
113	Patricia Grace Thomas Inn/Sankofa CDC/Museum on the National Roadway	5002 Frederick Avenue	02-314	2002	
114	New Life Missionary Baptist Church	1801 N. Bond Street	02-429	2002	
115	Cedarwood	4604 N. Charles Street	03-525	2003	Report
116	Masjid Al Haqq	514 Islamic Way	03-565	2003	Report
117	Fire Engine Company No. 25	2140 McCulloh Street	03-566	2003	Report
118	Arch Social Club	2426 Pennsylvania Avenue	03-567	2003	Report
119	Douglass Place	516-524 S. Dallas Street	03-568	2003	Report
120	Divine Mission Apostolic Church	1 N. Fulton Avenue	04-657	2004	Report
121	Weaver House	4319 Arabia Avenue	04-658	2004	Report
122	First English Lutheran Church	3807 N. Charles Street	04-696	2004	Report
123	Cherry Hill Elementary School #159	801 Bridgeview Road	04-699	2004	Report
124	Schwing Motor Company Building	3324 Keswick Road	04-814	2004	
125	The Mount	3706 Nortonia Road	06-217	2006	
126	St. Matthew United Church of Christ	2320 Mayfield Avenue	07-403	2007	Report
127	Baltimore City College	3320 The Alameda	07-404	2007	
128	Johnny Eck House	622 N. Milton Avenue	07-501	2007	Report
129	Christ Church United Church of Christ	1308 Beason Street	07-502	2007	
130	Ruscombe Mansion	4901 Greenspring Avenue/4901 Springarden Drive	07-503	2007	
131	Union Baptist Church	1219 Druid Hill Avenue; 39.301667°N 76.628333°W	07-534	2007	Report
132	Dr. John E.T. Camper House	639 N. Carey Street	07-576	2007	
133	Senator Theatre	5904 York Road	07-586	2007	
134	American Brewery	1701 N. Gay Street	08-02	2008	
135	W.E.B. Du Bois House	2302 Montebello Terrace	08-03	2008	Report
136	Riverside Park	301 E. Randall Street	08-04	2008	Report
137	Roland Park Water Tower	4210 Roland Avenue	08-05	2008	
138	Upton Mansion	811 W. Lanvale Street	08-06	2008	
139	Bolton Square	1400 - 1420 Mason Street, 300 - 310 W. Lafayette Avenue, 236 - 250 W. Lafayette Avenue, and 1401 - 1421 Jordon Street	08-37	2008	Report
140	Castalia	200 Tuscany Road	08-56	2008	Report
141	Mount Calvary Church	816 N. Eutaw Street	09-112	2009	Report
142	St. Paul Community Baptist Church	1901 E. Federal Street	09-115	2009	Report
143	St. Mark's Evangelical Lutheran Church	1920 St. Paul Street	09-116	2009	Report
144	Scottish Rite Temple	3800 N. Charles Street	09-117	2009	Report
145	Nazarene Baptist Church	1201 Harford Avenue	09-118	2009	Report
146	St. Stanislaus Kostka Church	700 block of S. Ann Street (west side)	09-119	2009	Report
147	Raffel Building	107 W. Heath Street	09-124	2009	Report
148	Four Bay House	1733 Aliceanna Street	09-125	2009	
149	Dr. Giering House	3906 Parkside Drive	09-126	2009	
150	Melvin Cade Armory	2620 Winchester Street	09-127	2009	Report
151	Harford Commons (William Fuld Company)	1508 Harford Avenue	09-128	2009	
152	President Street Station	601 President Street/801 Fleet Street	09-179	2009	
153	Ann Wiggins Brown House	1501 Presstman Street	09-247	2009	Report
154	Kresge Building	117 W. Lexington Street	09-248	2009	Report
155	Sellers Mansion	801 N. Arlington Ave	09-249	2009	Report
156	Waverly Town Hall	3100 Greenmount Avenue	11-535	2011	Report
157	Franklin-Delphey Hotel	300 W. Franklin Street	11-541	2011	Report
158	Grand Masonic Temple	221-227 N. Charles Street	11-542	2011	Report
159	Mayfair Theater	506 N. Howard Street	11-543	2011	Report
160	Hansa Haus	11 S. Charles Street	11-544	2011	Report
161	Grace Turnbull House	223 Chancery Road	11-545	2011	Report
162	St. Peter the Apostle Church Complex	11, 13, 16 S. Poppleton Street, 848 Hollins Street	11-551	2011	Report
163	Old Dunbar High School	540 N. Caroline Street	12-06	2012	Report
164	Shelley House	3849 Roland Avenue	12-56	2012	Report
165	Abell Building	329-335 West Baltimore Street	12-74	2012	Report
166	Appold-Faust Building	307-309 West Baltimore Street	12-75	2012	Report
167	Baltimore Equitable Society	21 North Eutaw Street	12-76	2012	Report
168	Equitable Building	10-12 North Calvert Street	12-77	2012	Report
169	Old Town National Bank	221 North Gay Street	12-78	2012	Report
170	St. Alphonsus Hall	125 West Saratoga Street	12-79	2012	Report
171	Terminal Warehouse Building	320 Guilford Avenue	12-80	2012	Report
172	Turnbull Building	311-313 West Baltimore Street	12-81	2012	Report
173	Frederick Douglass High School, #450	2301 Gwynns Falls Parkway	13-120	2013	Report
174	Historic Frederick Douglass High School	1645 North Calhoun Street	13-122	2013	Report
175	Florence Crittenton Home	3110 Crittenton Place	13-129	2013	Report
176	Trinity A.M.E. Church	2130 East Hoffman Street	13-153	2013	Report
177	Union Mill (Historic Druid Mill)	1500 Union Avenue	13-168	2013	Report
178	C.J. Youse Building	235 Holiday Street	13-169	2013	Report
179	Brinks Building	231 Holiday Street	13-170	2013	Report
180	Canton Methodist Episcopal Church	1000 South Ellwood Avenue	13-171	2013	Report
181	Messiah English Lutheran Church	1025 South Potomac Street	13-172	2013	Report
182	Parkway Theatre	3 West North Avenue	14-241	2014	Report
183	Monumental Lodge No.3, Improved Benevolent Protective Order of Elks of the World	1528 Madison Avenue	14-242	2014	Report
184	Haven Street Factory	101 North Haven Street	14-243	2014	Report
185	Public School No. 103, Henry Highland Garnet School	1315 Division Street	14-244	2014	Report
186	Cross Keys Valve House	5106 Falls Road	14-245	2014	Report
187	Enoch Pratt House	201 West Monument Street	14-247	2014	Report
188	St. John's in the Village	3009, 3009 1/2 Greenmount Avenue, 3001 Old York Road	14-289	2014	Report
189	Rehoboth Church of God in Christ Jesus Apostolic	700 Poplar Grove Street	14-305	2014	Report
190	Olmsted Parkways	R.O.W.s of 2600-3200 blocks of the Alameda, of 0000-1800 blocks of 33rd Street, and of 1600-3900 blocks of the Gwynns Falls Parkway	15-334	2015	Report
191	American Legion Federal Post No. 19	1502 Madison Avenue	16-501	2016	Report
192	Apostolic Faith Church of God	1939 Walbrook Avenue	16-505	2016	Report
193	Ambassador Theatre	4604 Liberty Heights Avenue	16-506	2016	Report
194	St. Mark's Institutional Baptist Church	655 North Bentalou Street	16-507	2016	Report
195	Eastern Avenue Pumping Station	751 Eastern Avenue	16-582	2016	Report
196	Dr. John Ruhrah Elementary Middle School, (School #228)	701 Rappola Street	16-583	2016	Report
197	Patterson Park	100 South Linwood Avenue (Block 1740, Lot 001) and 201 South Linwood Avenue (Block 1740, Lot 002)	16-584	2016	Report
198	Greater Faith Baptist Church	3000-3004 Huntington Avenue	16-589	2016	Report
199	Harry O. Wilson House	4423 Craddock Avenue	17-040	2017	Report
200	Chick Webb Recreation Center	623 N. Eden Street	17-069	2017	Report
201	Our Saviour Lutheran Church	3301 The Alameda	17-073	2017	Report
202	Hanlon Park	3051 Liberty Heights Avenue (Block 3099, Lot 001), 3001 North Hilton Street (Block 3099, Lot 002), and 2731 North Longwood Street (Block 3099, Lot 004)	19-258	2019	Report

== Landmarked interiors ==
Listing no.	Property name	Location	Ordinance no.	Year listed	Landmark report
PI1	Senator Theatre Public Interior	5904 York Road	11-465	2011	
PI2	St. Mark's Evangelical Lutheran Church	1920 Saint Paul Street	12-082	2012	Report
PI3	St. John's in the Village	3009 1/2 Greenmount Ave	14-290	2014	Report
PI4	City Hall Rotunda	100 North Holliday St.	15-404	2015	Report

== See also ==
- Lists of locally designated landmarks in the United States
- National Register of Historic Places listings in Baltimore
