= Baltimore Heritage Walk =

Trail linking 20 historic sites and museums

Coordinates: 39°17′2″N 76°36′44″W

The Baltimore City Heritage Walk is a heritage trail that links 20 historic sites and museums in downtown Baltimore, Maryland.

It is 3.2 miles long.

Sites and museums located along the trail include:

- U.S.S. Constellation Museum, Pier 1, (Constellation Dock), East Pratt Street, at South Calvert Street
- World Trade Center / Top of the World observation deck, (Maryland Port Administration), Pier 2, 401 East Pratt Street
- Baltimore Maritime Museum, (Historic Ships in Baltimore), Pier 3 (and Piers 4 & 5), 500 block - East Pratt Street
- Baltimore Public Works Museum, (old Eastern Avenue Sewage Pumping Station), 751 Eastern Avenue, at President Street boulevard.
- President Street Station, (Baltimore Civil War Museum), 601 President Street [boulevard], at Fleet Street
- Star-Spangled Banner Flag House, and War of 1812 Museum, (home of Mary Pickersgill), 844 East Pratt Street at Albemarle Street
- Reginald F. Lewis Museum of Maryland African American History & Culture, 830 East Pratt Street (at President Street boulevard)
- Carroll Mansion, (city townhouse/mansion of Charles Carroll of Carrollton), East Lombard Street, off Front Street / President Street boulevard
- Jewish Museum of Maryland, (Lloyd Street Synagogue and B'nai Israel Synagogue), Lloyd Street at Watson Street (off East Lombard Street)
- McKim Free School, 1120 East Baltimore Street at Asquith Street
- Old Town Friends' Meetinghouse, 1201 East Fayette Street, at Asquith Street
- Nine North Front Street (Second Mayor Thorowgood Smith's Home / Women's Civic League offices)
- Phoenix Shot Tower, East Fayette and North Front Streets
- St. Vincent de Paul Roman Catholic Church, 120 North Front Street (at East Fayette Street)
- War Memorial Plaza (War Memorial Hall), 100 block North Gay Streets, between East Fayette and Lexington Streets
- Zion Church of the City of Baltimore, (Evangelical Lutheran), 400 East Lexington Street at North Gay Street
- Peale Museum, (old Municipal Museum - now conference center), 225 North Holliday Street
- Baltimore City Hall, 100 Holliday Street (between East Fayette and Lexington Streets)
- Battle Monument, (War of 1812 / Battle of Baltimore, 1814), 100 block North Calvert Street, between East Fayette and East Lexington Streets
- Alex. Brown Building, 135 East Baltimore Street, at South Calvert Street

== See also ==
- Freedom Trail
- Oyster Bay History Walk
