= McKim's School =

- U.S. National Register of Historic Places
- Baltimore City Landmark
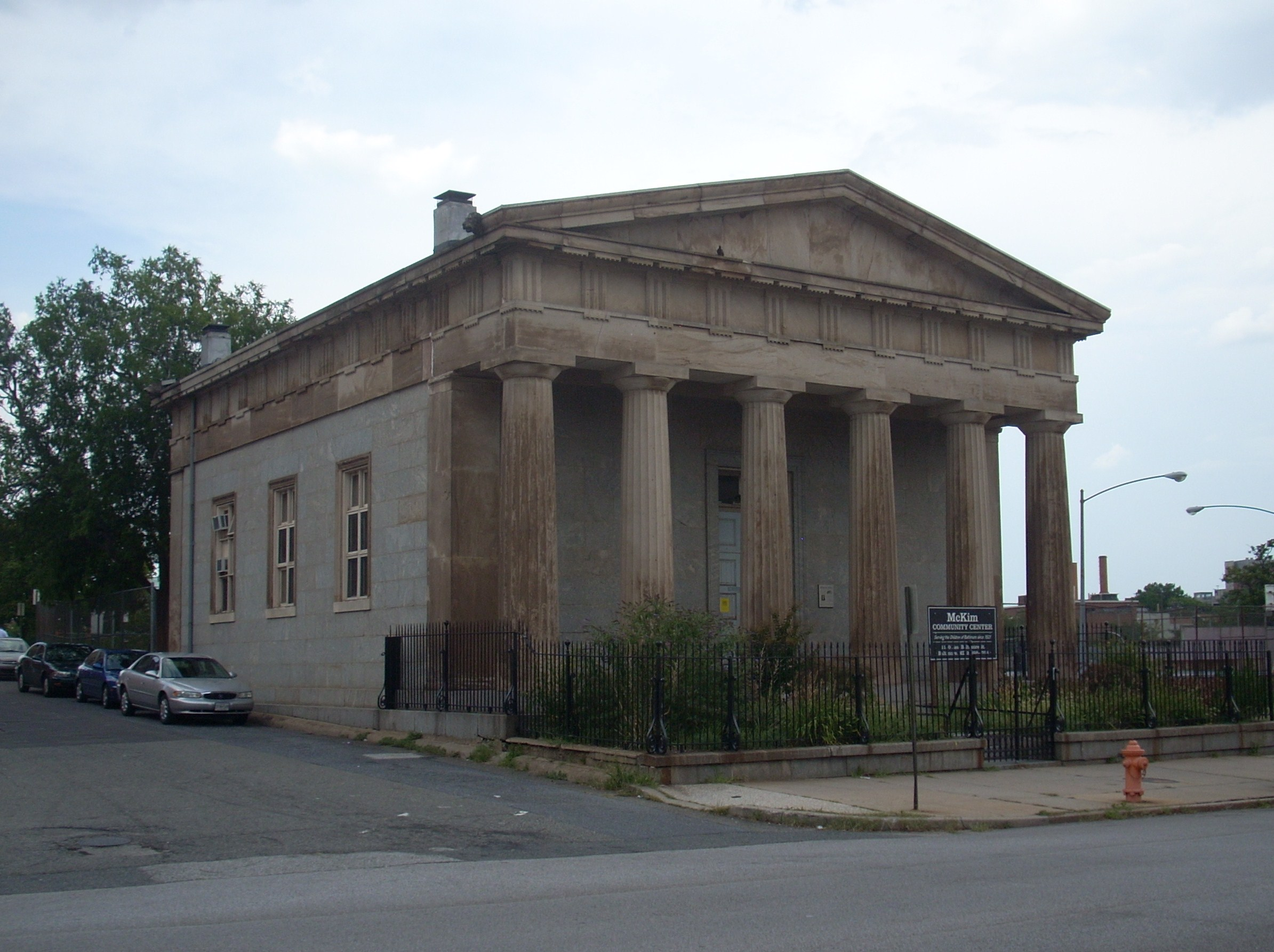
- McKim Community Center

- Location within Baltimore Location within Maryland Location within the United States
- Location: 1120 E. Baltimore St., Baltimore, Maryland
- Coordinates: 39°17′29″N 76°36′04″W
- Area: 19 acres (7.7 ha)
- Built: 1833
- Architect: Howard, William; Small, William
- Architectural style: Greek Revival
- NRHP reference No.: 73002190

Significant dates
- Added to NRHP: March 30, 1973
- Designated BCL: 1971

McKim's School, also known as McKim's Free School, is a historic school located at Baltimore, Maryland, United States. It is an archaeologically accurate Greek-style building. The front façade is designed after the Temple of Hephaestus, or Temple of Theseus, in Athens, Greece in granite. Six freestone Doric columns, 17 feet (5 meters) tall, support the entablature and pediment. The sides were derived from the north wing of the Propylaia on the Acropolis of Athens. The building site was funded by Quaker merchant Jon McKim who funded a trust for poor students managed by his son Isaac after his death in 1819. It was designed by Baltimore architects William Howard and William Small and erected in 1833. It served as a school and youth training center until 1945, when the building was adapted for use as the McKim Community Center. In 1972 the building was sold by trustees to the city.

McKim's School was listed on the National Register of Historic Places in 1973.

It is included in the Baltimore Heritage Walk.
