= Mayfair Theatre, Baltimore =

Former movie theater in Baltimore, Maryland, US

Coordinates: 39°17′43.4″N 76°37′12.5″W

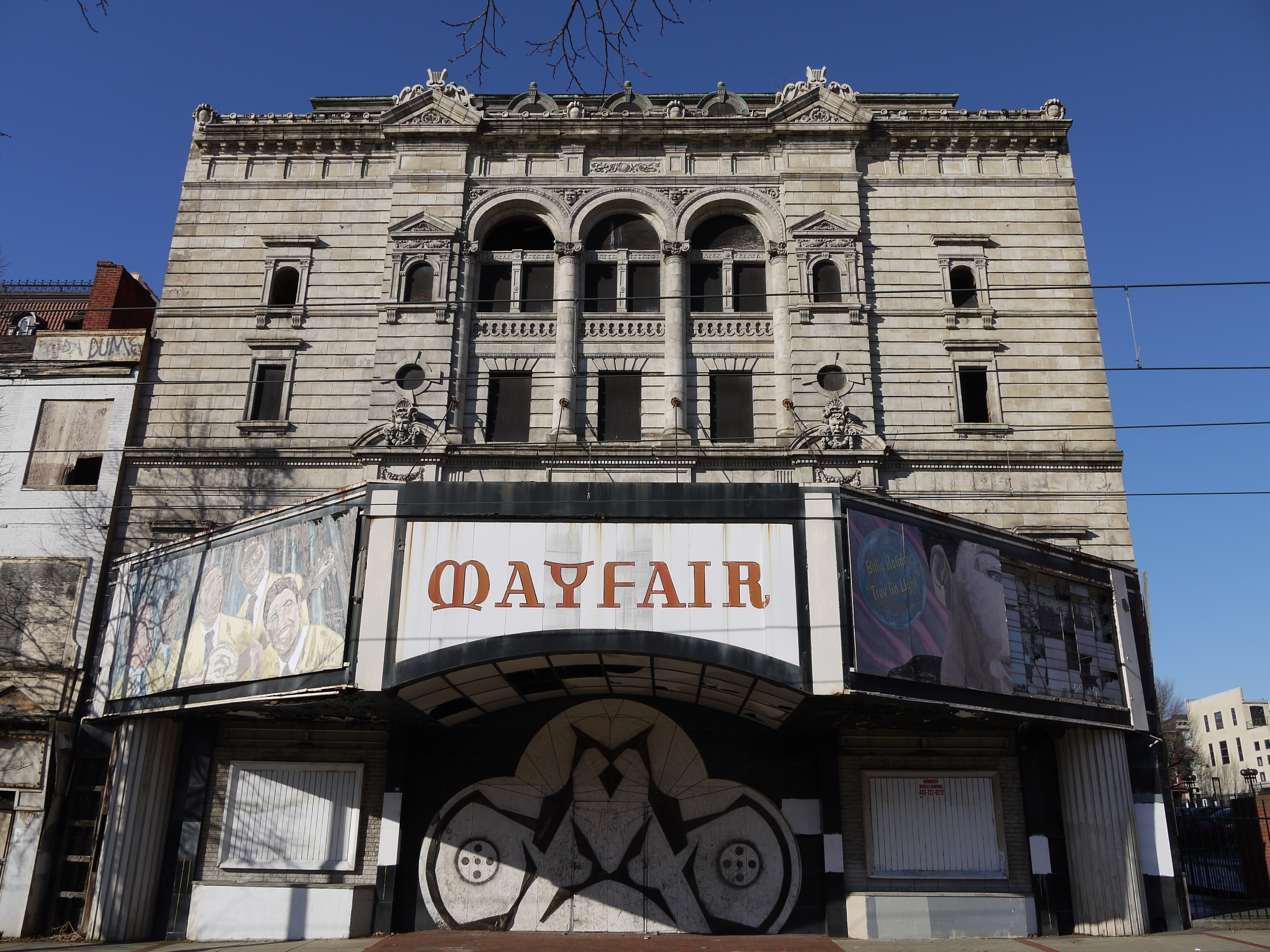
Mayfair Theatre

The Mayfair Theatre, also known as the Auditorium Theatre and Auditorium Music Hall, is a historic theatre site in Baltimore, United States. Originally opened in 1880 as a bathing house, it was demolished and rebuilt in 1904 as a theatre, which was closed in 1986. In 2016, the theater was demolished except for the facade and lobby. The remnant is listed as a Baltimore City Landmark and remains the focus of redevelopment plans.

== History ==
=== Previous uses ===
Built in 1880 and opening as the Natatorium on June 17, 1880, the first building was a bathing house and swimming school. After alterations, it became the Howard Auditorium opening April 6, 1891. The name was soon changed to Auditorium and it became an ice skating rink in Spring 1894. It was remodeled to the plans of architect J. B. McElfatrick and reopened September 30, 1895. In 1896 it was remodeled again to the plans of architectural firm J. B. McElfatrick, and a Palm Court was built on the roof garden. The old Auditorium was closed on April 4, 1903 and was demolished.

=== As a theatre ===
On the site rose a new Auditorium Theatre, built for $250,000, which opened on September 12, 1904 with Keith's Vaudeville and moving pictures. It was designed by architectural firm J.D. Allen & Co. of Philadelphia. It was taken over by the Shubert Bros. in 1909 until 1913. Briefly operated by Poli, it returned to the Shuberts in 1918. The theatre remained mainly a playhouse, although occasional films were presented. In the summer of 1940, the Auditorium Theatre was remodeled again, this time to the plans of local architect E. Bernard Evander who built a new theatre within the shell of the former Auditorium, by gutting the Auditoriums interior between the dressing rooms and the front entrance and between the first floor and the bottom of the second balcony. He also added a false ceiling below the second balcony or a dropped ceiling that concealed the steeply sloped second balcony and decorative dome above it that still had artworks on it, by adding this false dropped ceiling it brought the towering vault of the Auditorium downward. New flooring was laid a new screen was installed a new Proscenium for the stage was installed and the lobby was completely remodeled. Most of the original designs of the Auditorium was saved due to the closing off of the second balcony above the false ceiling as well as the front and side walls. On the outside the facade was modernized with a new triangular marquee and a new improved box office counter in between the two outer doors leading into the main lobby. The 850 seat building reopened as the re-branded Mayfair Theatre on January 31, 1941 with the movie A Night at Earl Carroll's starring Ken Murray. By 1960 it had been equipped with 70mm projectors. Adjacent, just north of the Mayfair Theatre, a small parking lot marks the spot of the Stanley Theatre, Baltimore's once largest theatre until it was razed in May 1965. The theatre itself closed on April 22, 1986. There was a hope of it reopening when the theatre was put up for auction in 1987 but the auction was cancelled when bidders offered no more than $200.000 for the property. Ever since then the building has been boarded up and deteriorated significantly since then.

Today the Mayfair Theatre is another vacant theatre building in downtown Baltimore City and has been vacant for more than three decades. Its roof collapsed in February 1998 and it was further damaged in a fire that occurred in an adjacent building in September 2014 from the removal of the Marquee from the sparks of the Acetylene Torch. As it was in general disrepair, engineers stated the crumbling building was a threat to public safety, and the structure (except the facade and the front lobby) was demolished in November 2016. It remains, however, a designated Baltimore City landmark, which sits in the Market Center National Register Historic District.

== Redevelopment ==
In 2016, the Baltimore Development Corporation (BDC) sought a Request For Proposals (RFP) to adaptively reuse the former Mayfair Theatre. By March 6, 2017, the BDC did not receive any bids from interested groups or developers, and reopened bidding in February 2018. In December 2018, the BDC selected Zahlco Development (of the 2 new bids offered), a local design and construction firm, to redevelop the site. Zahlco is planning to turn it into office retail and living space along with shopping venues next door that was once the site of the 1786 Golden Horse Tavern and 1900s New Academy Hotel that was recently torn down also due to structural concerns. The area would be called "Mayfair Place", will include new amenities include office space, a restaurant, gallery space, and an outdoor seating and performance area, as well as constructing new apartments and retail buildings, according to BDC meeting minutes. Plans put together by Zahlco and Moseley Architects to rehabilitate the historic facade of the Mayfair have been approved by CHAP (Commission For Historical Architectural Preservation) as well as the addition of a 6 story apartment complex on the site of the Franklin Delphy Hotel that includes retailing commercial office space a 31 space parking garage and other amenities.
