= Marion C. Bascom =

- Born: March 14, 1925; Pensacola, Florida, U.S.
- Died: May 17, 2012 (aged 87); Baltimore, Maryland, U.S.
- Education: Howard University

Marion Curtis Bascom (March 14, 1925 – May 17, 2012) was an American civil rights leader and Reverend at Douglas Memorial Community Church in Baltimore, Maryland, for 45 years.

Bascom oversaw numerous civic initiatives in the Baltimore community.

== Early life and career ==
Bascom was born in Pensacola, Florida, to Mary Anderson and Bruce Bascom. He had four children, the eldest of whom Bernadette Bascom, became an R&B singer.

Bascom attended grade school in Pensacola at the Spencer Bibbs school. This was followed by Booker T. Washington High School, Florida Normal and Industrial Institute in St. Augustine, Florida, and Howard University in Washington, DC. He also attended Wesley Seminary and Garret Biblical Institute and became a Reverend. He started his ministry in St Augustine, Florida, where he developed feelings about the problems among the black people at his church and elsewhere. He was asked to come to Baltimore in 1949 to join the Douglas Memorial Community Church, which is the oldest in Bolton Hill. This church was an independent, after splitting from Bethel A.M.E. in 1925.

In addition to his religious leadership, Bascom served on the board of directors of the Reginald L. Lewis Museum, and was a leader in the founding of "Associated Black Charities". Bascom served as Baltimore's first black fire commissioner, and organized a Meals on Wheels program for the community near his church. He developed a 49-unit apartment complex, Douglas Village, for disadvantaged members of the community, and established a summer camp for underprivileged children.

== Civil rights leadership ==
Bascom marched with Martin Luther King Jr. in Alabama, and led marches in Annapolis, Maryland. He also participated in protests at Baltimore's then all-white Northwood Theatre. Bascom led in the desegregation of many of the areas parks and restaurants, and on July 4, 1963, was one of 283 people arrested during a nonviolent protest at the segregated Gwynn Oak Amusement Park. The park integrated the following month.

== Death and legacy ==
Bascom died of a heart attack at the University of Maryland Medical Center. He was 87.

Baltimore mayor Stephanie Rawlings-Blake stated that Bascom was: "One of Baltimore's great civil rights leaders... who helped shape the religious and political infrastructure we all benefit from today... His faith inspired a commitment to the fight for equality and human rights for all Americans... He spoke for justice and advocated for the disenfranchised."

Former Baltimore mayor Kurt Schmoke stated: "A giant has fallen. He affected thousands of lives in our community and was a positive life force."

A firehouse in Baltimore was named in Bascom's honor.
