= G. Krug & Son Ironworks and Museum =

Historic building in Baltimore, Maryland, US

- G. Krug & Son Ironworks
- U.S. National Register of Historic Places
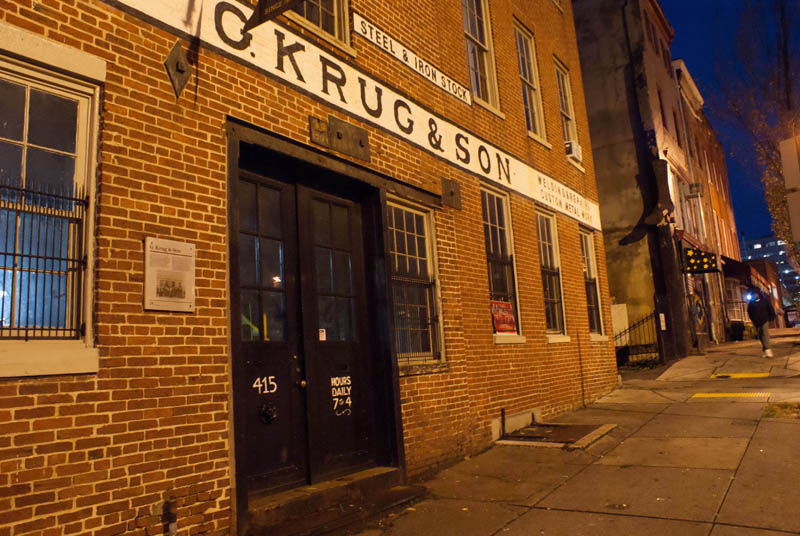

- Location within Baltimore Location within Maryland Location within the United States
- Interactive map of G. Krug & Son Ironworks
- Location: 415 W. Saratoga St., Baltimore, Maryland
- Coordinates: 39°17′34″N 76°37′20″W
- Built: 1810
- Architectural style: Victorian
- NRHP reference No.: 82004747
- Added to NRHP: 1982

G. Krug & Son Ironworks is an iron works located in Baltimore, Maryland, United States. It was founded in 1810 by German immigrants, and is the oldest continuously operating blacksmith shop in the United States.

== History ==
A blacksmith business was founded on the site in 1810 by German immigrant Augustus Schwatka, at the time on the outskirts of the city, it repaired cart wheels and horse shoes. After Schwatka died, it was owned by Andrew Merker between 1830 and 1873, who had bought the business from Schwatka's children. In 1858, Merker hired German immigrant Gustav A. Krug as a helper, and by 1868 a Baltimore business directory lists the company name as "Merker, A. & Krug". By this time they were specializing in iron fence railings and grills. Merker became "invalid" around 1873, and he dissolved his interest in the company turning it over to G. Krug on July 1, 1873 (Merker died in 1876). As Baltimore became more prosperous, higher-end homes and buildings needed ornamental ironwork, and the company expanded into this niche. Under Gustav A. Krug, the company's fortunes increased, becoming by the end of the 19th century a major ornamental ironworks, shipping products to the Eastern and Southern United States.

Krug's prime years were between the end of the Civil War and World War I. The peak of its decorative ironwork output was between about 1890 and 1910, when highly ornate architectural iron was most popular. After World War II, there was a drive towards modernization, stainless steel, and other modern materials, and the business for ornamental ironwork declined. However, beginning around 1970, there was increased demand for a certain product: ornamental iron security gratings for windows. Today, Krug's produces iron grills, railings, and other architectural elements often seen on buildings and fences throughout Baltimore and the United States. The Krugs' signature "Otterbein Style" can be seen on many buildings throughout Baltimore.

According to Allison Robicelli:

The works are visible nearly everywhere in Baltimore and Washington, DC, from the gates of Greenmount Cemetery, to the railings of the Peabody Library and the hospital gates at Johns Hopkins University to the historic buildings of Colonial Williamsburg in Virginia.

Other clients have included the Baltimore Basilica, Homewood House on the campus of the Johns Hopkins University, Otterbein Church, the Washington Monument in Mount Vernon Place, the Old Baltimore Shot Tower, Fort McHenry, the Lord Baltimore Hotel, the Hippodrome Theatre, and the Star-Spangled Banner Flag House.

As of 2025, the family has operated the business for five generations. The current president is Peter Krug, whose father was Theodore A. Krug, grandfather was Theodore Frederick Krug, great-grandfather was T. F. Gustav Krug, and great-great-grandfather was Gustav A. Krug.

== Buildings and museum ==
The ironworks are located in a historic complex of buildings: a two-story gable-roofed building from the early 19th century housing the earliest shop, a four-story Victorian building with a business office on the first floor and storage rooms above, and a three-story shed-roofed addition from 1870 to 1880.

A Baltimore City commission threatened to destroy the works in the 1970s when it wanted to tear them down and build a parking lot. Thanks to the efforts of then-president Theodore A. Krug, the works were saved; the buildings were restored, and in 1982, listed on the National Register of Historic Places.

In 2014, they opened a non-profit blacksmith museum at the location. It blends historical exhibits with the for-profit active ironworks. A tour includes watching the crew work; they use a combination of antique fire-and-hammer methods and contemporary metalworking technology, including plasma and laser cutting machines. There are exhibits of Krug's historic metalwork, project drawings, and antique business ledgers. A room holds samples of fence that Krug forged for the restorations of the Old Naval Hospital and the Marine Commandant's House, both in Washington, DC. There is a display of historic 19th-century locks and keys, along with replicas Krug made in the 1930s for Colonial Williamsburg in Virginia. There are displays of grates for old bank teller windows, hardware such as door hinges, and decorative pieces showing metal hammered into curling leaves.
