= Henry Niemann =

American organ builder (1838–1899)

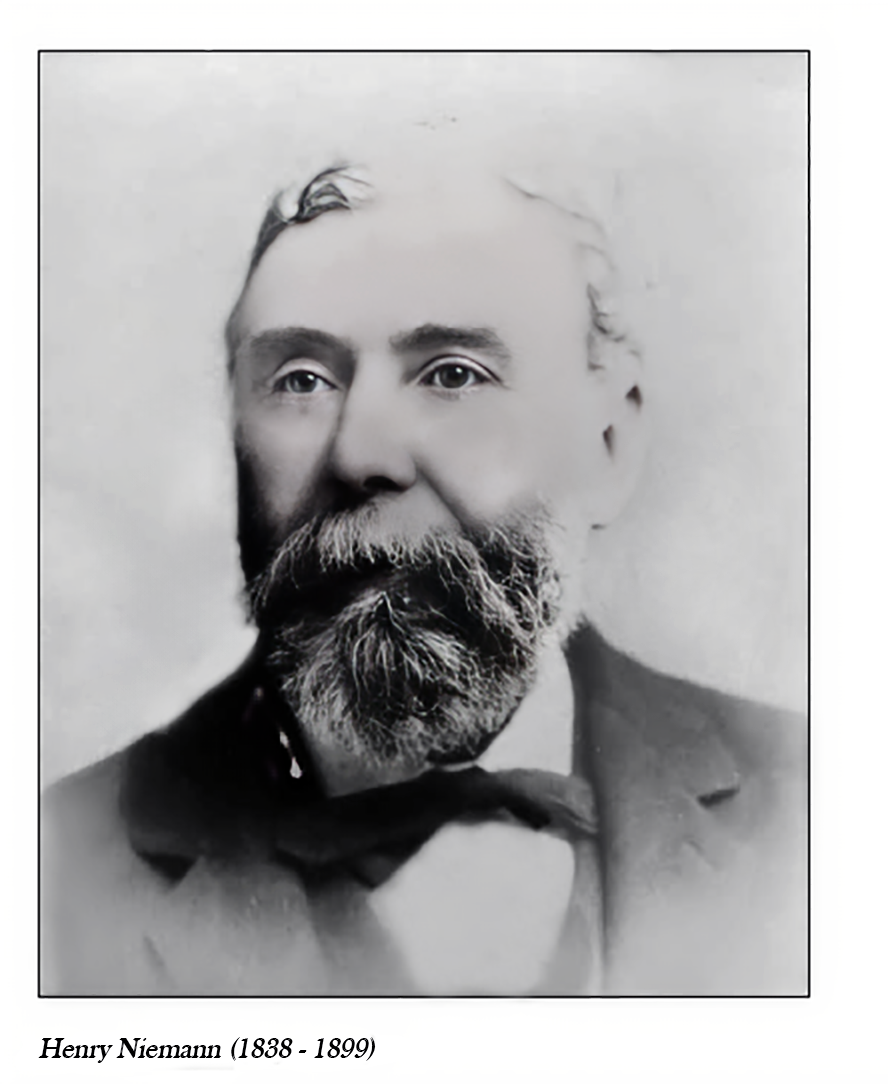
- Born: Henry Niemann; April 27, 1838; Osnabruck, Germany
- Died: October 26, 1899 (aged 61); Baltimore, Maryland, USA
- Known for: Pipe organ builder

Henry Niemann (April 27, 1838 – October 26, 1899) was a German-born pipe organ builder, who spent most of his career in Baltimore, Maryland. Of all the Baltimore organ builders, Niemann produced the most extant organs, some still in very good condition and retaining the tonal essence of his work. His organs were respected for their bold sound, fluid mechanisms, and quality construction

Niemann is considered one of Baltimore's premier organ builders.

== Biography ==
Niemann was born April 27, 1838, in Osnabruck, Germany, he was trained as a cabinetmaker there. In 1857 at the age of 19, Niemann came to America where he found employment with organ builder John Closs in Cincinnati, Ohio.

After two years in Cincinnati, he left for England to advance his knowledge of organ building. He worked there for three years with Charles S. Barker, known for his early use of pneumatic pipe organ actions.

In 1862 Niemann went to France to work for the most distinguished organ builder of the 19th century, Aristide Cavaillé-Coll, where he stayed five years. Both Barker and Cavaillé-Coll had high praise for Niemann's work. While in Paris, Niemann built several small organs, then left France to build a three-manual organ for the "Parr Kirche" in Meppen, Germany. This was followed by a tour of the leading organ factories in Europe, where Niemann observed the methods of various builders.

Niemann returned to the United States in 1872 and subsequently established his business in Baltimore. For a short time before 1875, Niemann was also employed by the well-respected organ building firm of E. and G. G. Hook & Hastings of Boston.

He also serviced organs in the city, including the Thomas Hall instrument in the cathedral (now basilica).

He advertised the opening of his first new American organ (for Zion German Reformed Church on Aisquith Street, Baltimore) in 1875.

=== The Niemann Firm ===
Between 1874 and 1875, Niemann had a partnership with Christopher Doeller. Niemann also had a short-term partnership with Charles J. Tillman, which was dissolved in March 1891. In addition to building new organs, the Niemann firm also performed routine maintenance and renovations of instruments built by others. From time-to-time, Nieman collaborated with other local builders such as Adam Stein. After Niemann's death in October 1899, the firm was continued by his son, Frank", "Niemann (1874−1937), retaining his father's business name. The factory was later sold, and Frank Niemann moved to Philadelphia. The firm was dissolved in February 1907.

=== Death ===
Henry Niemann died suddenly on October 26, 1899, at the age of 62, at his home at 1108 Forrest Place, Baltimore. His obituary states that he died of Bright's disease. During his long business career, he constructed instruments in every part of the country. In Baltimore alone he built about thirty. He was survived by a widow and five children.

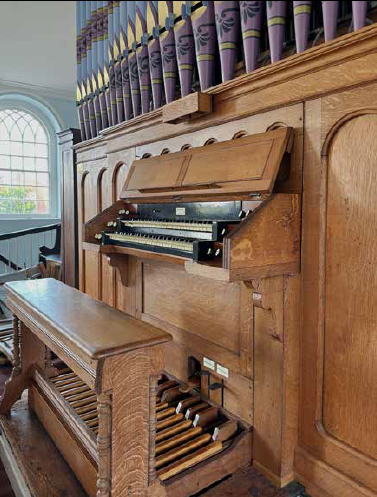
Old Otterbein Church, Henry Niemann (1897). Photo: Len Levasseur used with permission

=== Partial List of Organs built by Henry Niemann ===
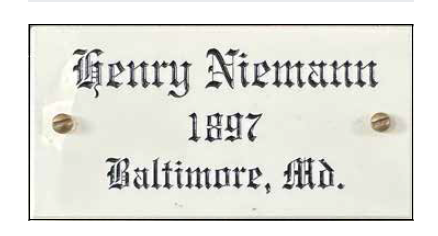

Unless otherwise noted, each organ was located in Baltimore, MD:

- St. Matthew Evangelical Lutheran (Fayette St.) ca. 1886.
- Zion German Reformed Church 1892.
- Zion Reformed / Waters AME Church 1875.
- St. Joseph’s Catholic Church, Taneytown, MD 1876.
- Universalist Tabernacle 1877.
- Eutaw Methodist Church 1878. In the early 2000s it was sold to a Lutheran Church near Lemasters PA, after being restored by organ technician John Johnson.
- Maryland Institute ca. 1878.
- Catholic Cathedral of the Assumption 1880. Niemann's largest organ. It was later sold to Associate Presbyterian Church and the facade went to Clark Memorial Methodist Church.
- Metropolitan Methodist Episcopal Church ca. 1880.
- Mount Zion African Methodist Episcopal Church, Annapolis, MD 1880.
- St. Mary's Industrial School for Boys, Baltimore (1880) / Mount Zion AME (Annapolis) / First Unitarian Church Hall, Baltimore (1985) 1880. It was built in 1880 for St. Mary’s, Industrial School for Boys, which opened in 1866. For many years, the organ was in the Mount Zion A.M.E. Church in Annapolis, Maryland. In 1985, it was installed at First Unitarian Hall. This organ was played in recital at the Organ Historical Society Convention in July 2024.
- Chatsworth Independent Methodist 1881.
- St. Leo the Great Catholic Church 1881. Organ extant & in use in 2024. This organ was played in recital at the Organ Historical Society Convention in July 2024.
- St. Joseph Passionist Monastery / Mountain Manor 1884. Organ is extent, but walled-in in a former chapel balcony
- Trinity Episcopal Church, Easton MD 1886.
- Christ Episcopal, Cambridge, MD 1887.
- St. Thomas Aquinas Catholic Church ca. 1888. This organ was played in recital at the Organ Historical Society Convention in July 2024.
- Harlem Ave Christian Church 1889. A July 15, 1889 article in the Baltimore Sun mentions a new organ, but makes no mention of builder name.
- Aisquith Street Presbyterian / 2nd German Reformed Church ca. 1890.
- Easton Methodist Episcopal Church, Easton, MD ca. 1890.
- Ebeneezer African Methodist Episcopal Church ca. 1890.
- Faith Presbyterian Church ca. 1890. A Baltimore Sun article on Feb 5, 1890 mentions new organ cost $4,000.
- Har Sinai Temple ca. 1890.
- St. Stanislaus Catholic Church ca. 1890. Organ demolished by contractor in early, 2000s when building was converted to condos.
- Associate Reformed Church / Greek Orthodox Cathedral ca. 1891. The 3-manual Niemann sanctuary organ of the cathedral was purchased and installed in the balcony of this church.
- St. John’s Methodist Episcopal South 1891. Sun Paper September 12, 1891, describes this organ.
- Twelfth Presbyterian Church 1891.
- Grace English Lutheran Church 1892.
- New Jerusalem Church 1892.
- St. Peter the Apostle Catholic Church 1892. Extant, in storage.
- St. Thomas' Evangelical Lutheran Church 1892.
- First Unitarian Church (Sanctuary) 1893. Extant in 2024 and in working condition (with several added stops). This organ was played in recital at the Organ Historical Society Convention in July 2024.
- Greene St. Evangelical Church (AKA Emmanuel) 1893.
- Appoid Methodist Episcopal Church(AKA Christ Methodist) 1894. Der Deutsche correspondent. 9/3/1894 describes large organ.
- Pitts Creek Presbyterian Church, Pocomoke City, MD 1894.
- St. Paul's Catholic Church, Washington, DC 1894.
- St. Elisabeth's Catholic Church 1895.
- St. Paul's Episcopal Church, Suffolk, VA 1895.
- Fourteen Holy Martyrs Catholic Church 1897. Niemann contracted in 1898 for a new $2500 2-manual organ. This replaced or made use of the Pomplitz organ. Articles in The Sun on June 7, 1897 and on June 30, 1897 say organ was 20 stops and 781 pipes.
- Methodist Church, Chestertown MD 1897.
- Old Otterbein United Methodist Church 1897. AKA German Evangelical Reformed and Otterbein United Brethren. This organ was played in recital at the Organ Historical Society Convention in July 2024.
- Sts. Peter & Paul Catholic Church, Cumberland MD 1898.
- Holy Rosary Catholic Church 1899. This was probably an Erben organ which was repaired and installed by Niemann.
- Immanuel Baptist Church 1899.
- Second English Lutheran Church 1899.
- Clark Memorial Methodist Church / St. John's Independent Methodist Church 1900.
- Holy Name Catholic Church, Washington, DC ca. 1900.
- First Independent Christ Church.
- Lee St Baptist Church. A Sun article on Sunday September 30, 1901 refers to a concert using the new Niemann organ.
- North Avenue Baptist / McCormick Memorial
- Sharon Baptist Church, Catonsville, MD.
- St. Agnes Catholic Church, Catonsville, MD
- St. Ann's Catholic Church, Waverly Baltimore, MD
- St. Barnabas Protestant Episcopal Church
- Third English Lutheran Church. Named in 1903 Niemann advertisement, but probably Pomplitz & Rodewald, from 1850's
- Third Universalist Church ca. 1877.
