= Carroll Hunting Lodge =

Historic building in Baltimore, Maryland, US

Coordinates: 39°21′53.9″N 76°40′27.7″W

Carroll Hunting Lodge is a stone house built around 1790, in the Cheswolde area of Baltimore, Maryland. It is a Baltimore City Landmark, and one of the oldest in the surrounding neighborhood. The house stands on land formerly owned by Charles Carroll of Carrollton (1737–1832), a signer of the Declaration of Independence. Whether Carroll used the house is unknown.

The house was built on a 1,200-acre tract owned by Charles Carroll called "Labrynth"; Labyrinth may also have been the historic name for the house. There is no evidence that Carroll used the house as a hunting lodge, but it is likely it was built as the foreman's house for an adjacent mill that Carroll owned. From 1803 to 1809, the property was owned by Bernard Sourzac, one of several French immigrants from Haiti who settled in Mount Washington in the early 1800s. Years later, in the mid-19th century, the property formed part of a light industrial complex of snuff and tobacco mills along the Western Run, known as the Pimlico Tobacco Works. An advertisement from that period shows both men and women smoking and taking snuff. The great flood of 1868 caused much damage to the mill property, and this imposing structure is the one surviving building. It is an excellent example of Maryland 18th-century vernacular architecture in its symmetry and simplicity; its heavy stone construction suggests how remote this area was, at that time, from the fashionable City of Baltimore.
