= Congressman Parren J. Mitchell House =

- U.S. National Register of Historic Places
- Location within Baltimore Location within Maryland Location within the United States
- Location: 1805 Madison Ave.., Baltimore, Maryland
- Coordinates: 39°18′26″N 76°37′55″W
- Area: less than one acre
- Built: 1886
- Architectural style: Queen Anne
- MPS: Civil Rights in Baltimore, Maryland, 1831-1976
- NRHP reference No.: 100009062
- Added to NRHP: June 29, 2023

Congressman Parren J. Mitchell House, is a historic rowhouse located at Baltimore, Maryland, United States. It was built about 1886, and is a three-story, red brick Queen Anne-style dwelling on a raised basement. It features a wood cornice over a band of uneven brick corbels with brick brackets. It was the home of Congressman Parren J. Mitchell.

It was listed on the National Register of Historic Places in 2023. It is located in the Old West Baltimore Historic District.
