= Madison Avenue Methodist Episcopal Church =

Historic church in Maryland, US

- U.S. National Register of Historic Places
- Baltimore City Landmark
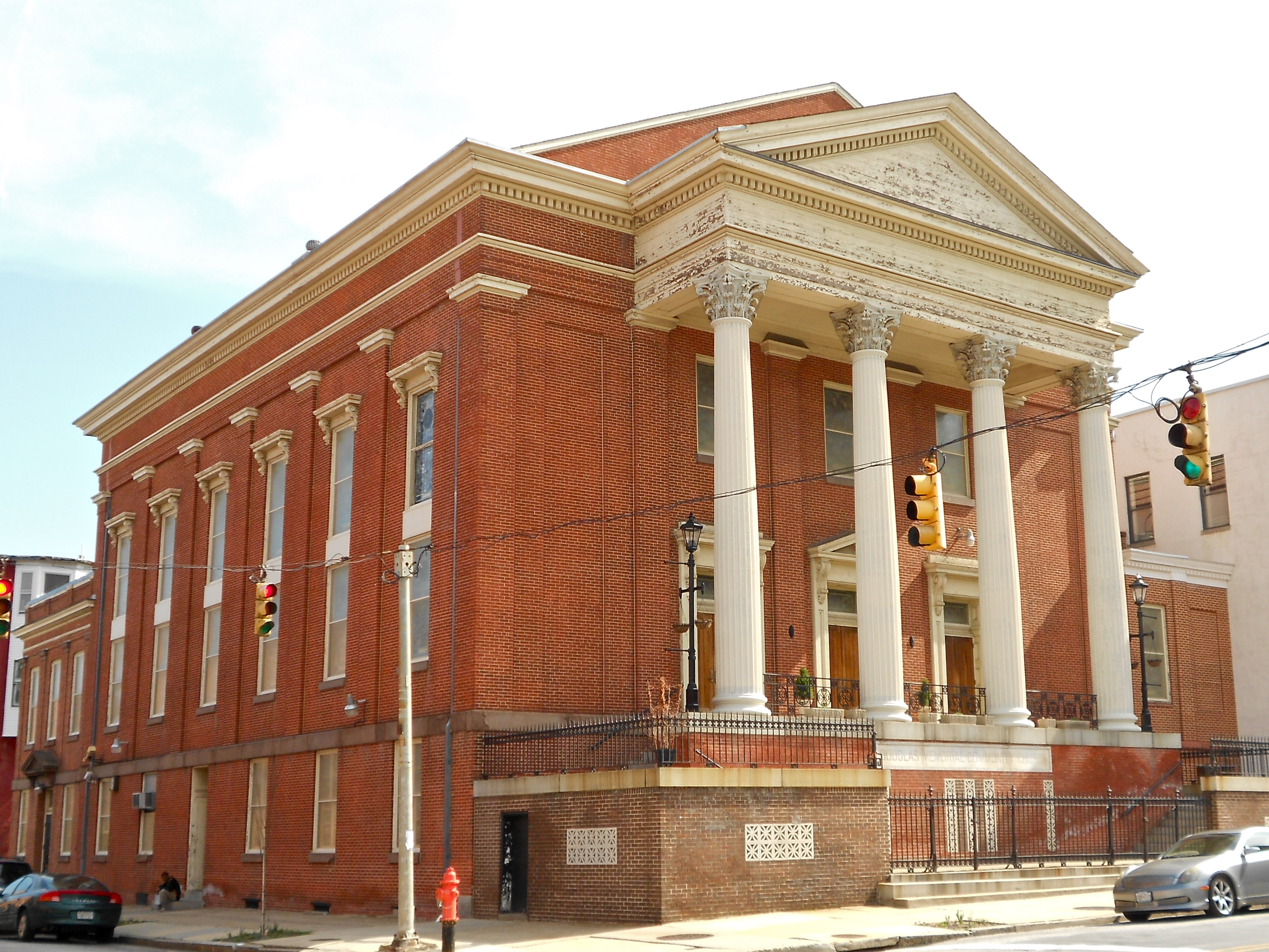
- Madison Avenue Methodist Episcopal Church, March 2012
- Interactive map of Madison Avenue Methodist Episcopal Church
- Location: 1327 Madison Ave., Baltimore, Maryland
- Coordinates: 39°18′14″N 76°37′40″W
- Area: less than one acre
- Built: 1857
- Architect: Balbirnie, Thomas
- Architectural style: Greek Revival
- NRHP reference No.: 92001153

Significant dates
- Added to NRHP: September 4, 1992
- Designated BCL: 1995

Madison Avenue Methodist Episcopal Church, now known as Douglas Memorial Community Church, is a historic Methodist Episcopal church located at Baltimore, Maryland, United States. It is a brick, Greek Revival, temple-fronted structure featuring four fluted Corinthian columns and built 1857–1858. The rear addition is a two-story Colonial Revival style wing dating from about 1900.

Madison Avenue Methodist Episcopal Church was listed on the National Register of Historic Places in 1992.

Pastors at Douglas Memorial Community Church include Marion C. Bascom and Raphael Warnock.
