= John E. T. Camper =

Physician and Civil Rights activist (1897–1977)

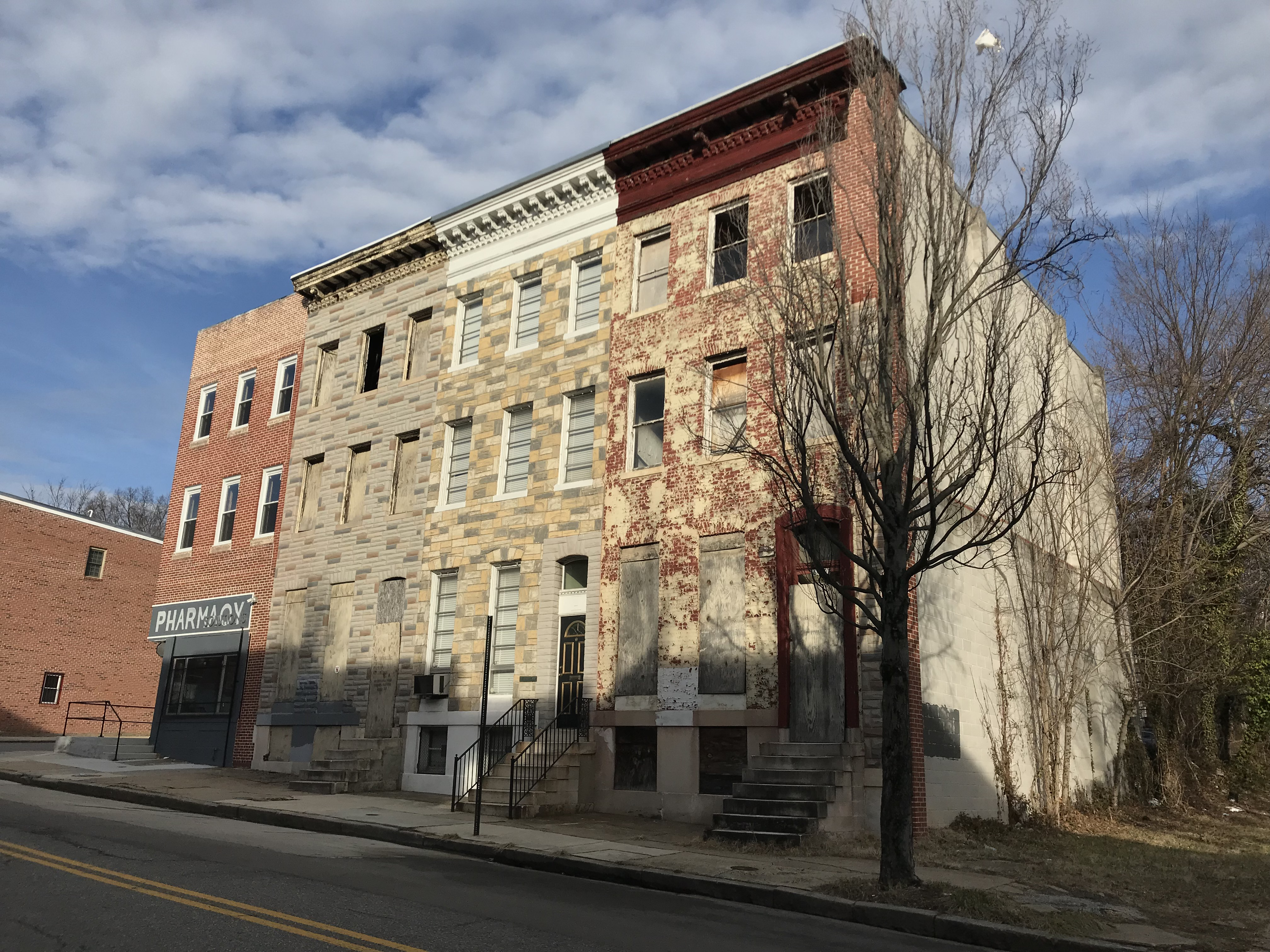
The Dr. John E.T. Camper House at 639 N. Carey Street in the Harlem Park neighborhood is a Baltimore City Landmark (2nd from R.)

John Emory Toussaint Camper (1897 – November 21, 1977) was a prominent physician and Civil Rights activist. Born in Baltimore, Maryland and raised in Sparrows Point, Camper was a graduate of Frederick Douglass High School. Prior to attending Howard University, Camper served in World War I, and during World War II, he was appointed to the Maryland Commission to Study Problems Affecting the Colored Population and served as a draft-board physician. While attending Howard, Camper was a star athlete in several sports, including football, and he was president of the school's chapter of the Phi Beta Sigma fraternity.

After graduating from the Howard University Medical School in 1920, Camper worked as a physician at Provident Hospital in Baltimore.

In early 1942, Camper emerged as a leading civil rights figure in Baltimore following the death of Private Thomas Broadus. On February 1, 1942, Broadus, a Black soldier stationed at Fort Meade south of Baltimore, was fatally shot in the back by a white Baltimore City police officer, Edward R. Bender, during a dispute on Pennsylvania Avenue. The killing, which marked the tenth such death of a Black citizen at the hands of local police in three years, sparked outrage within Baltimore's African American community. Through his leadership in MeDoSo, a civic club of Black physicians and dentists that Camper co-founded to use their resources to fight racial injustice, he was appointed to formally request assistance from the local branch of the NAACP to investigate the shooting.

Camper collaborated with civil rights attorney Juanita Jackson Mitchell and the Baltimore NAACP to establish the Citizens Committee for Justice (CCJ). The CCJ was formed as an umbrella organization designed to cross organizational boundaries and mobilize the broader public against systemic police brutality. Camper served in a leadership capacity for the newly formed committee.

Under the banner of the CCJ, Camper was instrumental in organizing the historic "March on Annapolis" in late April 1942. He managed the logistics of arranging transportation for an estimated 2,000 protesters representing 150 different community and civic organizations. The mass demonstration at the state capital pressured the Governor and the state legislature to address the inequalities in law enforcement. The protesters' demands extended beyond justice for Broadus, calling for the dismissal of the Baltimore Police Commissioner and the unprecedented hiring of Black police officers to patrol city streets.

This mobilization proved to be a watershed moment in both Maryland's civil rights history and Camper's life. Not only was it the first mass demonstration for civil rights at the Maryland state capital, the CCJ's campaign cracked Baltimore's segregated policing and demonstrated the efficacy of mass, unified protest. For Camper, the March on Annapolis cemented his transition from a local physician to a dedicated political organizer, paving the way for his continued fight against segregation at institutions like Ford's Theatre and his eventual run for the U.S. Congress as a Progressive Party candidate in 1948.

In 1943, Camper was appointed to the board of management at Crownsville State Hospital for the Insane. In 1948, Camper ran for Maryland's 4th Congressional district as a Progressive Party candidate, of which he was the state co-chair.

Camper died at the age of 83 and after fifty-seven years of medical practice on November 21, 1977.

The Dr. John E.T. Camper House at 639 N. Carey Street in the Harlem Park neighborhood is a Baltimore City Landmark. This was his former West Baltimore residence during the events of the 1940s.
