= St. John's Episcopal Church (Baltimore) =

Historic church in Maryland, United States

- St. John's Protestant Episcopal Church
- U.S. National Register of Historic Places
- Baltimore City Landmark
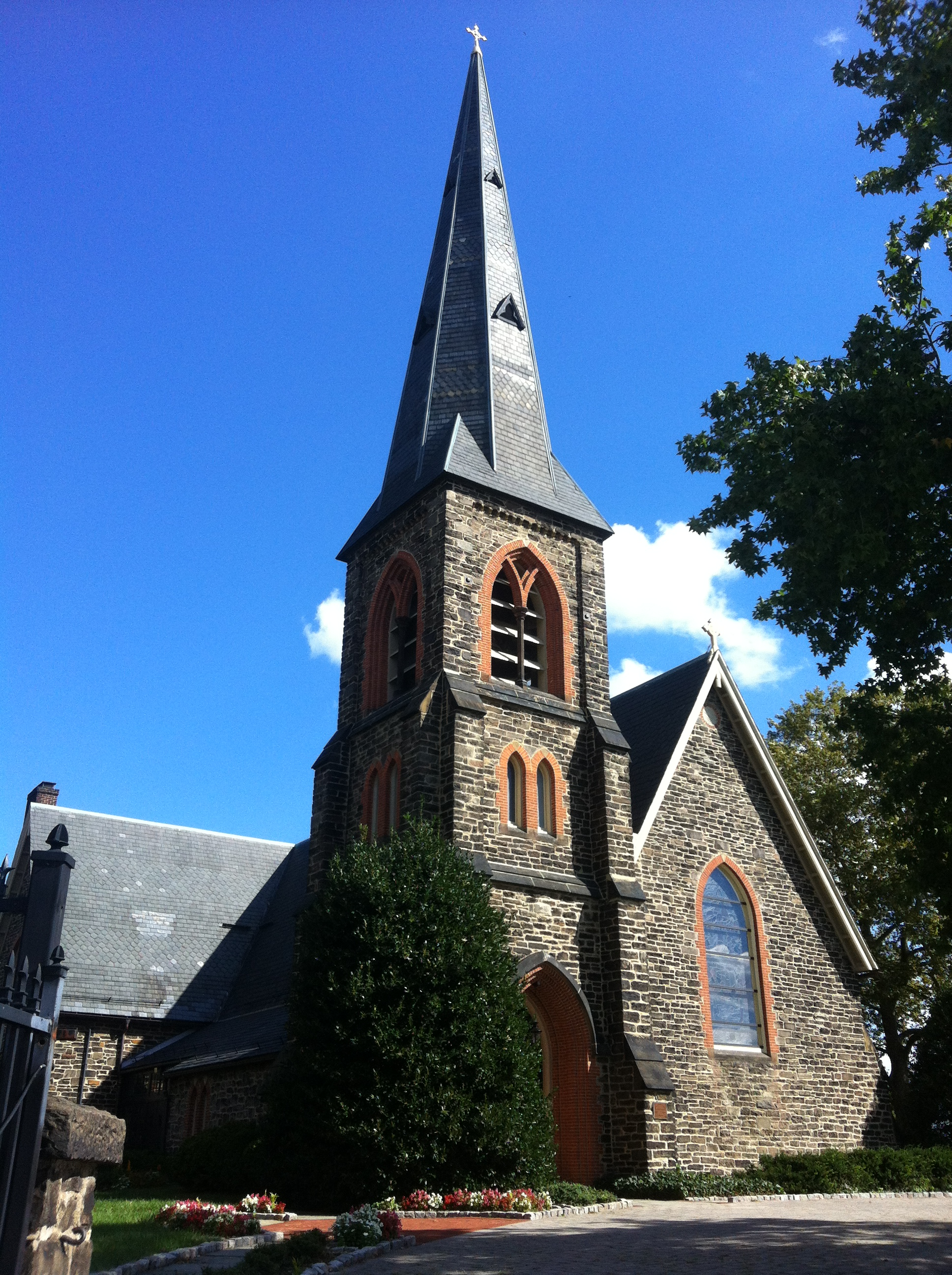
- Bell tower of St. John's Protestant Episcopal Church
- Interactive map of St. John's Protestant Episcopal Church
- Location: 3009 Greenmount Ave., Baltimore, Maryland
- Coordinates: 39°19′31″N 76°36′32″W
- Area: 5 acres (2.0 ha)
- Built: 1849
- Architectural style: Gothic Revival
- NRHP reference No.: 74002214

Significant dates
- Added to NRHP: March 27, 1974
- Designated BCL: 2014

St. John's Episcopal Church, also known as St John's in the Village, is a nineteenth-century Episcopal church building on Old York Road (off Greenmount Avenue and 31st Street) in the former village of Huntingdon (now the community of Waverly) in northeast Baltimore, Maryland, United States. The church closed in April 2023. The congregation was often referred to as "St. John's of Huntingdon Episcopal Church". It is a Gothic Revival structure built originally in 1847. Also on the property is a cemetery. The church reported 143 members in 2015 and 72 members in 2023; no membership statistics were reported in 2024 parochial reports. Plate and pledge income reported for the congregation in 2024 was $0.00 with average Sunday attendance (ASA) of zero persons.

St. John's Protestant Episcopal Church was listed on the National Register of Historic Places in 1974.
