= Arch Social Club =

Afro-American men's social club in Baltimore, United States

- The Maryland Club
- U.S. National Register of Historic Places
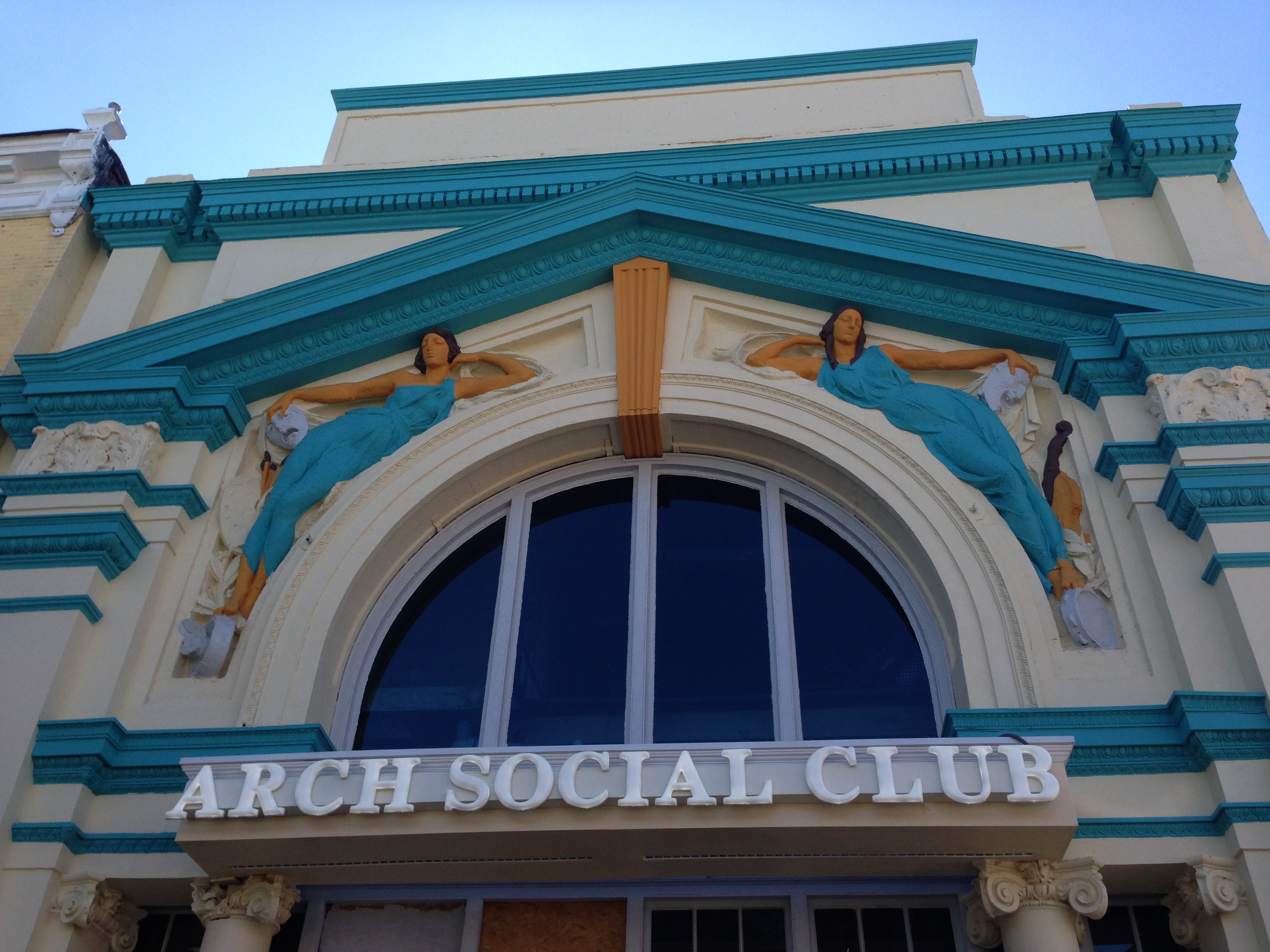
- Arch Social Clubhouse at 2426 Pennsylvania Avenue, Baltimore

- Location within Baltimore Location within Maryland Location within the United States
- Location: 2426 Pennsylvania Avenue. Baltimore, Maryland
- Coordinates: 39°18′36″N 76°38′33″W
- Area: Less than one acre
- Built: 1912
- Architect: Emmart, Paul
- Architectural style: Beaux Arts
- MPS: Civil Rights in Baltimore, Maryland, 1831-1976
- NRHP reference No.: 100011434
- Added to NRHP: February 6, 2025

The Arch Social Club was casually founded in 1905 and officially incorporated on March 15, 1912. The club is very much a child of Baltimore's brutally repressive racial environment. Black people at the dawn of the 20th century were savagely pushed to the political, social, cultural and economic margins by a combination of white folkways and state statutes. Out of necessity, African Americans sought collective survival in the construction of a parallel civil society. Schools, churches, benevolent associations, commercial enterprises, cultural venues and every conceivable social institution that addressed the exclusionary nature of the broader white society and day-to-day needs of Black folk were forged–often in the face of de jure, race-driven harassment and humiliation.

Raymond A. Coates, Jeremiah S. Hill and Sam L. Barney founded the Arch Social Club. It was dedicated to: The social, moral and intellectual uplift of its members, and in order that charity may be practiced in a Christian-like spirit and true friendship and brotherly love be promoted and maintained.

For over 100 years, Arch Social has been a fixture of Black Baltimore's civil society. Many scholars have asserted that Arch Social is the oldest known, continuously operating African American men's club in the United States. (The Monday Club, Inc. in Wilmington Delaware was established in 1876 and officially incorporated November 4, 1893 and recently celebrated 125 years of continuous service to the community and its membership)

The club rapidly attracted a broad cross-section of Black Baltimore's population, as it was religiously/politically non-sectarian, multi-class and color-caste neutral. It was a pioneering Black civil societal institution at the dawn of the 20th century.

Long associated with entertainment, the Arch Social Club is actually a benevolent and community action formation. Application for membership is by invitation only. Its clubhouse also applies a strict dress code for anyone attending events.

For 50 years (1922-1972), the organization occupied a clubhouse at 676 West Saratoga Street (downtown-west Baltimore). The historic structure was demolished in an urban renewal scheme.

In 1972, the former Morgan Theatre (Schanze Theatre, Uptown Theatre) at the corner of Pennsylvania Avenue and West North Avenue (2426 Pennsylvania Avenue, Baltimore, MD 21217) became the new clubhouse. The Arch Social Clubhouse is the last remaining venue for live entertainment (especially Jazz) on Baltimore's historic Pennsylvania Avenue commercial strip.

The building was designated a Baltimore City Landmark in 2003. The building was listed on the National Register of Historic Places in 2025. It is a contributing resource to the Old West Baltimore Historic District.
