= Gallagher Mansion and Outbuilding =

Historic house in Maryland, United States

- U.S. National Register of Historic Places
- Baltimore City Landmark
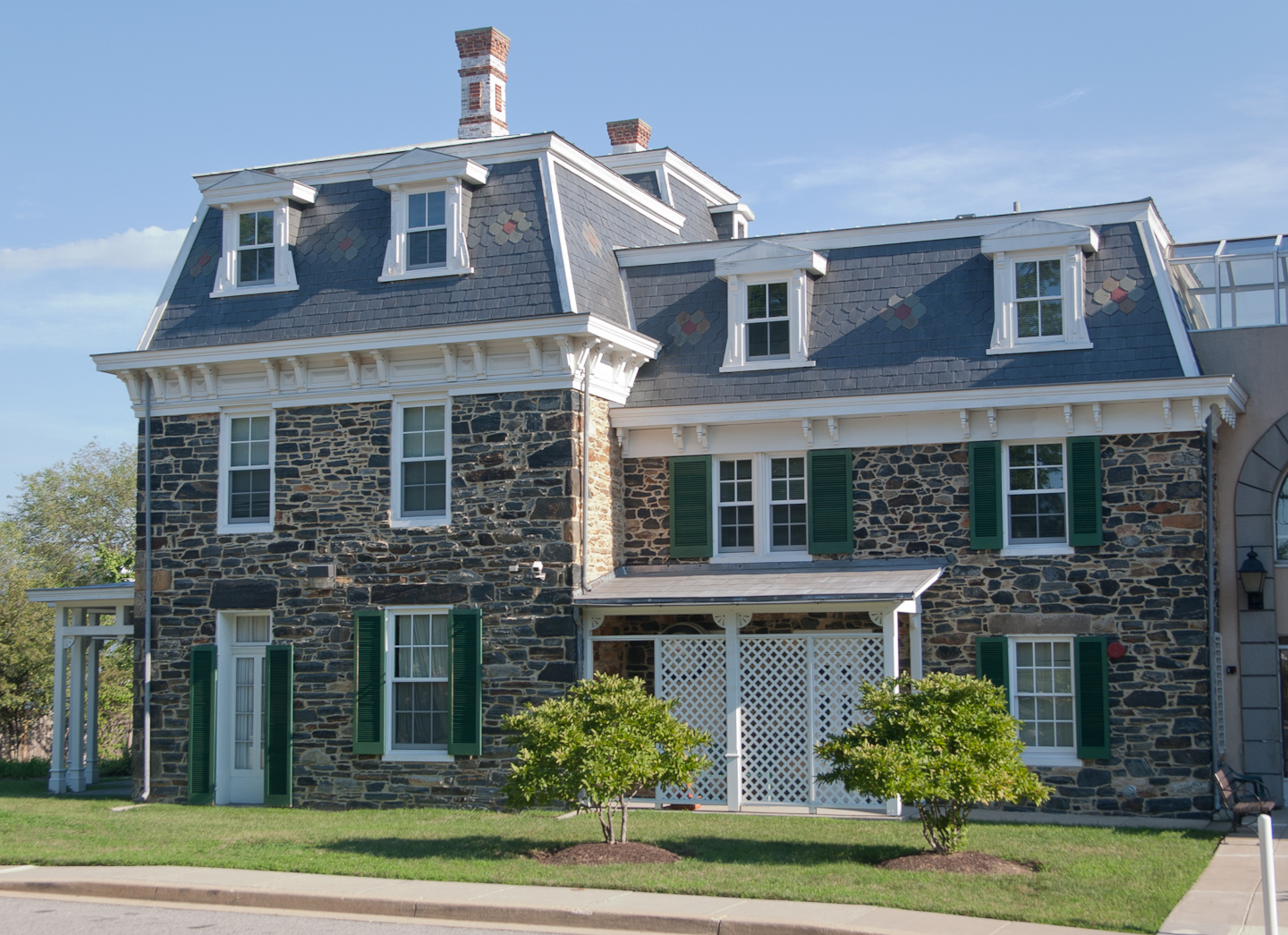
- Gallagher Mansion, August 2011
- Interactive map of Gallagher Mansion and Outbuilding
- Location: 431-435 Notre Dame Lane, Baltimore, Maryland
- Coordinates: 39°21′5″N 76°36′39″W
- Area: 3.6 acres (1.5 ha)
- Built: 1854
- Architectural style: Italianate
- NRHP reference No.: 83002934

Significant dates
- Added to NRHP: September 15, 1983
- Designated BCL: 1982

Gallagher Mansion and Outbuilding is a historic home located at Baltimore, Maryland, United States. It was originally built about 1854 as an Italianate villa, and was subsequently enlarged and embellished in the Second Empire style of the later mid century. It features walls built of local rough fieldstone and rubble and a mansard roof covered with decorative slate. The outbuilding is a two-story rectangular wood carriage house with a hip roof and cupola.

Gallagher Mansion and Outbuilding was listed on the National Register of Historic Places in 1983.
