= Our Saviour Lutheran Church (Baltimore) =

Church in Maryland, United States

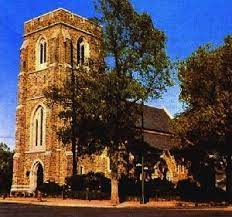
- View of the church from the west
- Our Saviour Lutheran Church
- 39°19′43.13″N 76°35′41.08″W
- Location: Baltimore, Maryland
- Country: United States
- Denomination: Lutheran Church-Missouri Synod
- Website: https://www.oursaviourbaltimore.org]

History
- Dedication: September 7, 1930

Architecture
- Functional status: Active
- Architect(s): Frohman, Robb, and Litt
- Style: Early English and Norman

Specifications
- Length: 99 feet (30 m)
- Width: 55 feet (17 m)

Our Saviour Lutheran Church in Baltimore, Maryland, United States, is affiliated with the Southeastern District of the Lutheran Church – Missouri Synod. The building is noted as one of the first in America to combine the architecture of the Early English and Norman periods and is prominently located at 3301 The Alameda.

== History ==
The congregation of Our Saviour Lutheran Church purchased its present site at 33rd Street and The Alameda from the Frank Novak Realty Company in 1919 and in 1920 constructed a wood frame chapel that seated 200. On August 8, 1921, a fire burned the rear half of the chapel, destroying the pipe organ that the congregation had brought with them from their former home on E. Fairmount Avenue in Baltimore. Plans to have architect J.A. Dempwork design a church were abandoned with the arrival of Pastor Rev. Adolph John Stiemke in 1924; he guided the congregation toward building a stone church, and hired the architecture firm of Frohman, Robb, and Little—the same firm that designed Washington National Cathedral. Initial sketches and preliminary plans were provided in June 1927, and Edward A. Wehr of Pittsburgh was chosen as the general contractor. Stiemke would remain as pastor until 1961. Ground was broken on November 25, 1928 and the cornerstone for the present building was laid on August 4, 1929. Dedicated on September 7, 1930, Our Saviour Lutheran Church is still known as one of “the finest small churches in America.” Two decades after opening its new church, the congregation had grown in number and expanded its activities. It had a robust Sunday School, and in 1951 the church opened the first Sunday School class for children and young adults with intellectual disabilities. This growth required the addition of a Parish Activities Building, to contain classrooms and meeting spaces, which was designed by architect Howard G. Hall of Baltimore. The contractor was J.H. Williams and the building cost $178,360.28. It was dedicated in June 1958. On November 13, 2017 the Baltimore City Council approved Ordinance 17-0110, adding Our Saviour Lutheran Church to the “Baltimore City Landmark List: Exteriors.” BCC Art. 6 section 4-2(1)

=== Property ===
The church is located at the northeast corner of 33rd Street and The Alameda in the Ednor Gardens-Lakeside neighborhood, about 4 miles NNW from the center of Baltimore. It stands diagonally across 33rd Street from Baltimore City College, which is of similar style and stone color.

== Architectural features ==
Our Saviour Lutheran Church combines the architecture of the Early English and the Norman periods. It was built with the thought of permanency and incorporates a true devotional atmosphere. The interior includes a chancel 20-foot (6.1 m) wide by 33 feet 7 inches (10.24 m) deep, a nave measuring 22 by 80 feet (6.7 by 24.4 m), and side aisles 11 feet (3.4 m) in width. It seats 210 in the nave proper, the side aisles seat 136 more, and there are 36 main-floor sittings on the first level of the tower. There is no west gallery. Each bay is 14-foot (4.3 m) on centers and each arch is 22 feet 6 inches (6.86 m) high to its peak. The columns are 14 feet (4.3 m) high and 24 inches (61 cm) thick, with good capitals and bases. The wrought iron hardware, made by Philadelphia craftsman Samuel Yellin, is of special interest because of its excellent conformity with the architectural motif.

=== Stained glass ===
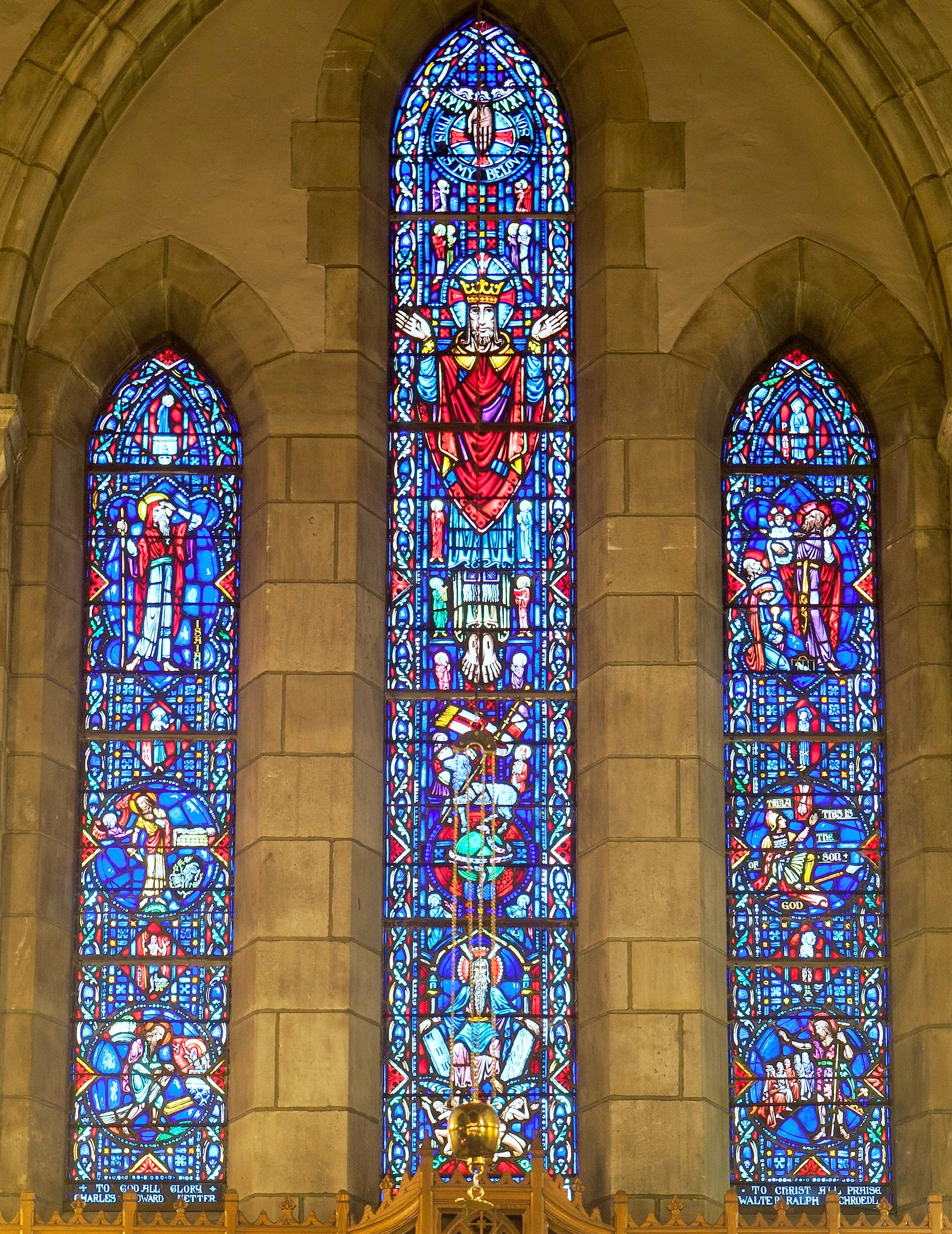

In the years between 1949 and 1962, members of the congregation commissioned 32 stained glass windows from the Willet Stained Glass Company. The first three windows to be installed were those above the altar: they depict the article of faith, that both the Old and New Testaments reveal Jesus Christ as the Savior. In 1949 they were dedicated as a memorial to four members of the congregation who died in World War II: the windows were donated by the parents of the veterans and other members of the congregation. All of the windows were designed by Marguerite Gaudin (an internationally famous stained glass designer at Willet Studios). Among Gaudin's other notable design achievements were windows for the National Presbyterian Church and Chapel in Washington, D.C., the Cathedral of St. John the Divine in New York City, and Grace Episcopal Cathedral in San Francisco. Most of the church's windows depict two or three related scenes from the Old or New Testaments; others contain illustrations of the various Creeds of the Church or its hymns, e.g., "Te Deum."

=== Chancel ===
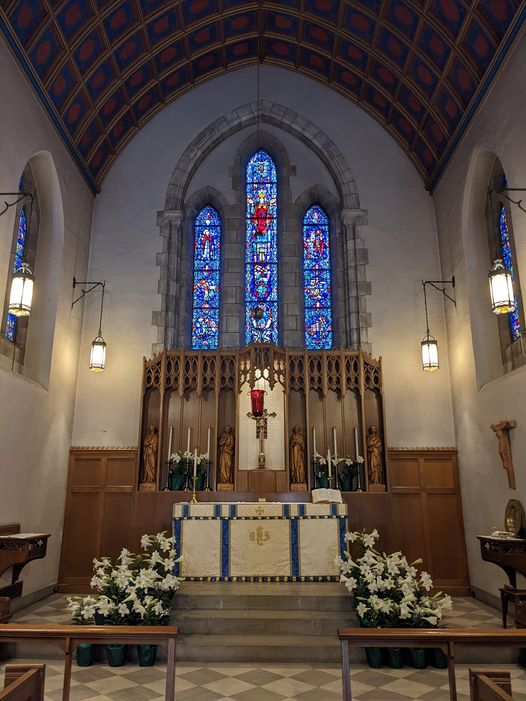

The furnishings in the chancel are particularly harmonious because the pipe organ, altar, pulpit, communion rail, hymn boards, and lectern were all designed and built by M.P. Moller Organ Company of Hagerstown, MD.

The altar features a wooden carved reredos, which includes images of the four evangelists (Matthew, Mark, Luke, and John). The reredos also holds a cross and candlesticks.

=== Tower ===
Typical of Norman towers, the tower at Our Saviour is substantial; it is about 72’ high and 25’ square, with one large, unvaulted arch on the west face. The tower has a short ground stage, a long second stage, a short stage at the ringer's room, and a longer belfry stage. The stone walls are 3' 6" thick at the lower stage, 4' 9" thick where tower and nave join, and drop back to 2' 4" at the belfry stage. The inside of the tower includes the bell chamber and a lower workshop. An arch close to 30' high opens out of the tower into the nave. There is no western gallery. One authority has said that “this is but one of perhaps a scant two dozen churches in the United States where the tower happens to be of dignified mass.” The tower doorway is done in a style that is transitional from Norman to Early English

=== Bells ===
The 18 bells in the tower were a gift from two members of the congregation, John and Alma Wever, in 1934. They were cast by the McShane Bell Foundry Company of Baltimore. At that time, they were the largest set of carillon bells in Maryland and the largest set cast in an American foundry.They each weigh between 500 and 3,000 pounds, and each has a lengthy inscription consisting of Bible verses and dedications. Playable from the organ console, the range and equal temperament of the bells are such that all melodies can be played or transposed to come within the compass of the chime. In earlier days, the bells were frequently used to greet marchers as they paraded westbound along 33rd Street toward Memorial Stadium for various sporting events. It was for a time a tradition when the Navy played games at the old Memorial Stadium to play "Anchors Aweigh" on the bells as the midshipmen marched down 33rd to the stadium.

== Moller Pipe Organ ==
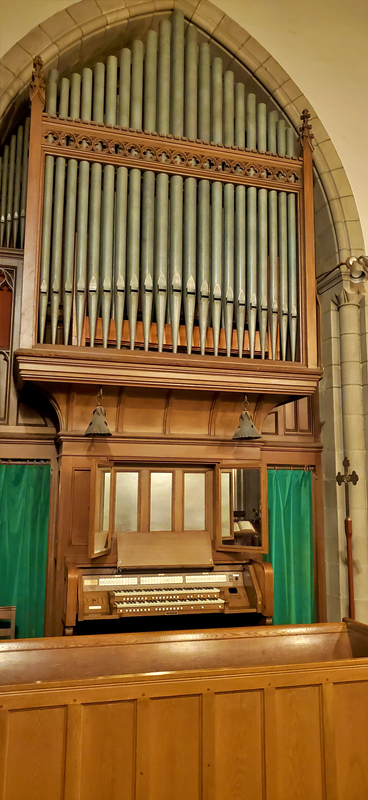

In 1930 the church contracted with M.P. Moller Organ Company of Hagerstown, MD, to build a two-manual pipe organ of 13 ranks (825 pipes), using pitman chests. Their Opus 5779 was delivered later that year, at a cost of $5,000.

Moller rebuilt the organ in 1987, adding 5 ranks (317 pipes) and updating the wiring and voicing of the instrument. In 2023, the Moller console was replaced with a Viscount console that plays the Moller pipe work and 13 new computer-generated voices in a hybrid installation. The new console features 99 levels of memory, and interfaces with all 18 ranks of pipes, the 18 tower bells, and a bell toller.

== History of the Congregation ==
The rich history of Our Saviour Lutheran Church's congregation dates back to March 7, 1892, when 12 active members of the then-German Immanuel Lutheran Church were granted a peaceful release to become the nucleus of a new English- speaking congregation that became known as Jackson Square Lutheran Church. When the congregation moved to its current site on The Alameda, it changed its name to the Evangelical Lutheran Church of Our Saviour. In 1973, this congregation merged with another historic Lutheran congregation, St. Matthew Lutheran Church, which was located at 1901 Druid Hill Ave. St. Matthew's had been founded in 1929 by a group of African American Lutherans who moved from rural Meherrin, Virginia, to Baltimore in the first wave of the Great Migration. The new combined congregation—composed of a predominately Black parish of 110 communicants and a predominantly White parish of 325 communicants—was renamed "Lutheran Church of Our Saviour." Mergers between predominantly white and a predominantly African American congregations were highly uncommon, and this melding set a precedent in both Baltimore and the Lutheran Church-Missouri Synod. The congregation has a long history of being active in its community. In addition to starting the city's first Sunday School for children and young adults with disabilities in 1951, it helped develop a community health facility and child care center. Today, the congregation is still thriving and serving its community at large.

== Civil Rights Advocacy of the Congregation ==
Our Saviour Lutheran Church was one of eight in its neighborhood and the adjoining neighborhood of Coldsteam-Homestead- Montebello that banded together to fight "blockbusting" in their communities in the 1960s and 1970s—that is, when agents were "buying properties from white people for cheap due to fears of an influx of African-Americans, and then selling to African-Americans for significantly higher prices and often with financially-predatory lending terms." The eight churches formed Homestead-Montebello Churches, Inc., which worked with community partners and was "resolute in their determination to expose instances of unlawful real property schemes, and to assist those residents so victimized by seeking redress of their losses to the fullest extent of all available remedies at law."

This group of churches pooled their resources to hire Vincent Quayle, then a Jesuit seminarian, to investigate the predatory real estate practices in the area. Quayle later went on to found and become the long-running Executive Director of St. Ambrose Housing Aid Center. Thanks to the efforts of fair-housing advocates, Homestead-Montebello Churches Inc., and others, the U.S. Department of Justice initiated an investigation into the blockbusting practices in Baltimore. They were made illegal under the 1968 Civil Rights Act.

In October 1972, the congregation hosted a meeting for city housing officials (including Housing Commissioner Robert Embry Jr.) and neighborhood groups on the topic of racial "steering" practices.
