= Riverside Park (Baltimore) =

Park in Baltimore, Maryland, US

Coordinates: 39°16′13″N 76°36′29″W

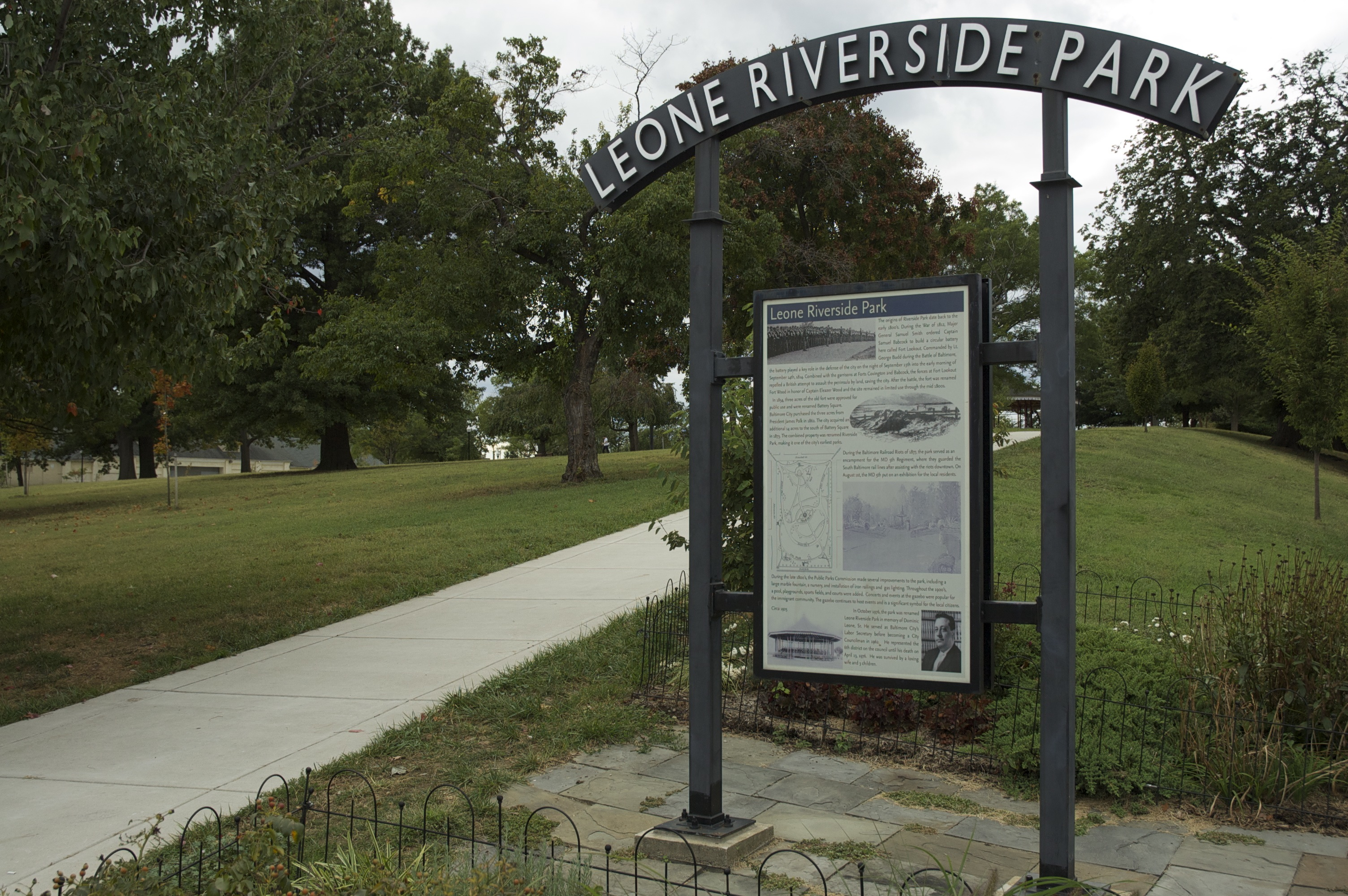
- Entrance to Riverside Park
- Interactive map of Riverside Park
- Type: Public park
- Location: Baltimore, Maryland
- Area: 17 acres (6.9 ha)
- Created: 1876

Riverside Park is a nearly 17-acre (6.9 ha) public park located in the historic Riverside neighborhood in Baltimore, Maryland. The park is also known as Leone Riverside Park.

== History ==
Early in Baltimore history, the site of Riverside Park was often used as a lookout point because of the clear view it offered of the South Baltimore peninsula and the Patapsco River. Because of this, during the War of 1812 Major General Samuel Smith ordered Captain Samuel Babcock to build a circular battery at the location, called Fort Lookout. Commanded by Lt. George Budd during the Battle of Baltimore, the battery played a key role in the defense of Baltimore. Combined with the garrisons at Forts Covington and Babcock, the forces at Fort Lookout assisted in repelling a British attempt to assault the peninsula by land, saving the city. After the battle, the fort was renamed Fort Wood in honor of Colonel Eleazer Wood, and the site remained in limited use through the mid-1800s.

In 1854, Baltimore applied to condemn 3 acres for public use along Randall, Covington and Heath Streets and rename the property Battery Square. The city formally acquired the 3-acre square in 1862 from James Polk. In 1873, the city acquired an additional 14 acres to the south of Battery Square and renamed the property Riverside Park, making it one of the oldest parks in the city system. In 1876, the city passed an ordinance putting the park under control of the Public Park Commission.

During the Baltimore Railroad Riots of 1877, the park served as an encampment for the 5th Regiment of the Maryland National Guard. After assisting with the riots downtown, the regiment marched to Riverside Park on July 30 to help guard the South Baltimore rail lines. On August 1, the regiment put on an exhibition for the local residents.

In the following years, the Public Park Commission made several improvements to the park: a large marble fountain in the center, a nursery, iron railings, and gas lighting. Large attendances (in the thousands) were not unknown in the late 1800s. A swimming pool, playgrounds, and sports fields and courts were added at various times during the 20th century. Concerts and events at the gazebo, which are held to this day, were a popular attraction for the local citizens and provided a welcome distraction for the immigrant community that sprouted around the park.

Baltimore City Rec and Parks announced in 2019 that it has developed plans for athletic field improvements and a fieldhouse renovation at Riverside Park. Overall, field improvements will consist of new lights, backstops, dugouts, fencing, basketball court, field drainage, and grass. The fields will be reconfigured to incorporate the CSX property that the city acquired along Wells street. Plans have been developed for the fieldhouse to renovate the bathrooms, storage areas, concession area, and seating.
