= Otterbein Church (Baltimore) =

Historic church in Maryland, United States

- U.S. National Register of Historic Places
- Baltimore City Landmark
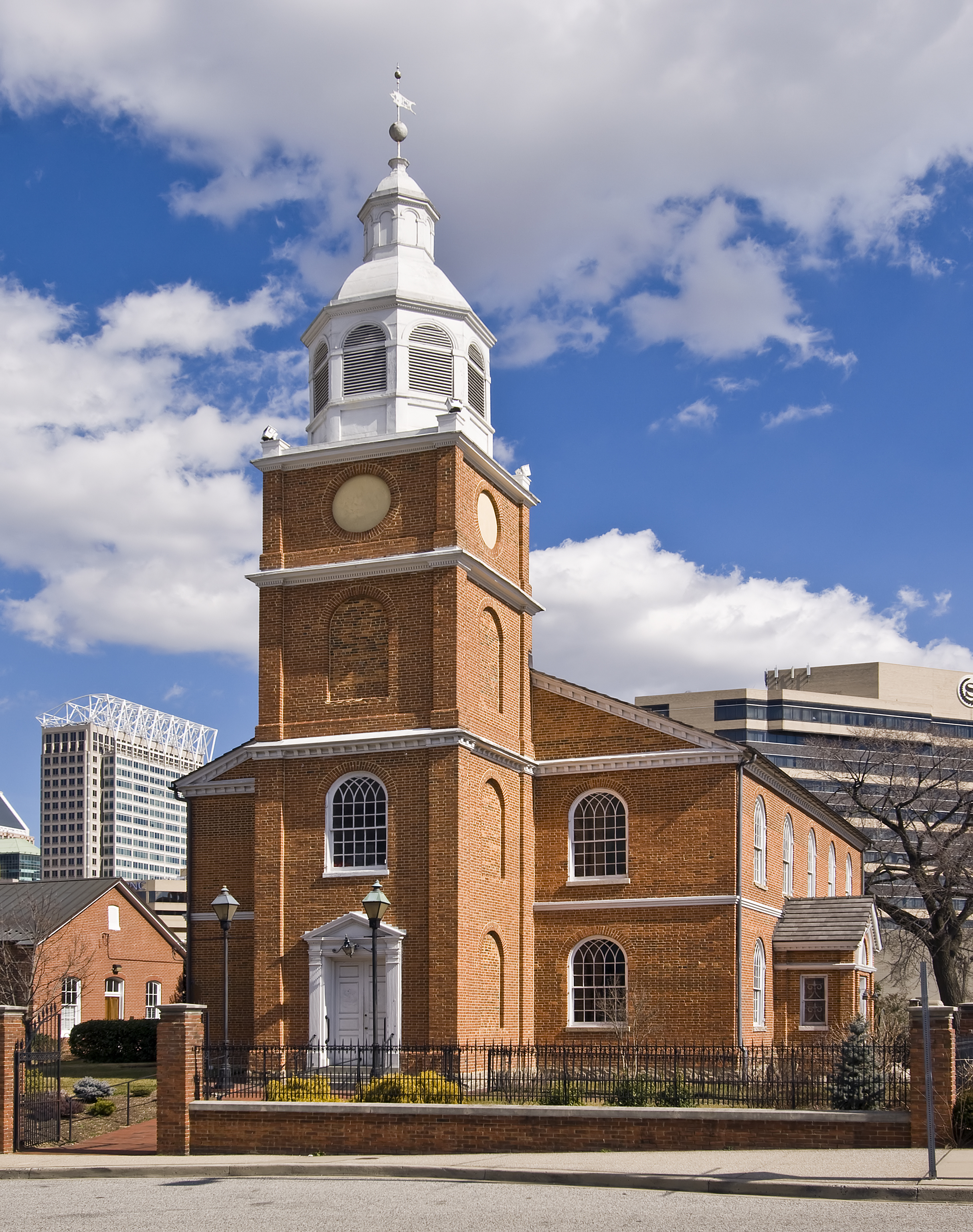
- Old Otterbein Church in 2012

- Location within Baltimore Location within Maryland Location within the United States
- Location: 112 West Conway Street at South Sharp Street, Baltimore
- Coordinates: 39°17′4″N 76°37′2″W
- Area: 0.6 acres (0.24 ha)
- Built: 1785
- Architect: Jacob Small, Sr.
- Architectural style: Georgian architecture
- NRHP reference No.: 69000324

Significant dates
- Added to NRHP: October 28, 1969
- Designated BCL: 1971

Otterbein Church, now known as Old Otterbein United Methodist Church, is a historic United Brethren church located in Baltimore, Maryland, United States. The first "German Reformed" church was built to serve the German Reformed and some Evangelical Lutheran immigrants, and later entered the Brethren strain of German Reformed Protestantism in the later Church of the United Brethren in Christ.

== Description ==
It is a two-story brick Georgian structure with a peaked roof, built 1785–1786. It features a square bell tower and an octagonal white "cupola-on-cupola", with much of the original wavy, hand-blown glass window panes still remaining. It had a major remodeling occurring in 1839, and some additional cleaning and restoration of its exterior brick walls and wall-fence surrounding the parish. The tower's bells date to 1789, and are still in use. That same year, the first Conference of United Brethren preachers was held and resulted in the official organization of the Church of the United Brethren in Christ, with Pastor Philip William Otterbein, (1726–1813) as a bishop (five years after he participated in the "laying on" of hands on famous evangelist and missionary Francis Asbury, (1745–1816), ordained as the first bishop of the new Methodist Episcopal Church. He was later buried in the adjacent churchyard, surrounding the building.

== Location ==
Old Otterbein Church is located just east of the landmark Camden Street Station and three blocks west of the Inner Harbor. For decades it was surrounded by many blocks in every direction by very densely packed neighborhoods of rowhouses, businesses and factories/manufacturies. Most of these former structures have been razed in the last two decades. Much of this area is now occupied by Oriole Park at Camden Yards baseball stadium (built in 1992), the Baltimore Convention Center (built 1979, with a large 2002 addition), and several large glass-towered hotels of national chains, to the east, west, and north.

To the south lies a several block-sized remnant of the former configuration, featuring many examples of the classic "working-man's" small two-story brick rowhouse. However, some of which were torn down for a proposed cross-town routing of Interstate 95 before it was instead routed further south where it skirts the residential neighborhoods of old South Baltimore and nearby historic Federal Hill, to the Fort McHenry Tunnel and under the Baltimore Harbor/Patapsco River.

== History ==
In the late 1970s, the spared rowhouses were offered up to prospective "urban homesteaders" for the famous "dollar a house" and were gradually renovated, updated and restored with additional homes and "row-house-like" apartments and condos constructed in between the older housing fabric, resulting in "Otterbein now being one of Baltimore's showcase neighborhoods visited now by thousands of tourists who stroll its now tree-shaded streets every week-end. Additional renovations and restorations have spread further southeast to the historically ancient black community of "Sharp-Leadenshall" (named for the two intersecting streets), which also had some new housing complexes built that have held their value in the decades since.

To the northwest of the old historic, now landmark church, jumping across the Camden Yards sports complex, the older community-shattering "urban renewal" style of the 1940s to 50s and 60s had spared also those neighborhoods, so "Pigtown"/Washington Village, Ridgely's Delight" with projects of individual house rows and new replica housing along West Barre Street and South Paca Street all the way to the "west-side" of downtown Baltimore's old "Loft District" along West Pratt, Lombard and Redwood Streets between South Howard Street with most of the major clothing and hat manufacturing structures that dominated American menswear business of the late 19th and early 20th Century (spared by the Great Baltimore Fire of 1904, are still there with their solid red-brick Romanesque architecture styles converted over into expensive apartments/condominiums. To the west end of these substantially changed areas is the new "inner beltway" around downtown of the landscaped parkway of Martin Luther King, Jr. Boulevard connecting into Russell Street extending into the Baltimore–Washington Parkway of Interstate 295 and running parallel to Interstate 395, which both exiting the downtown district of the city to the southwest alongside the other western end of the Camden Yards baseball and football stadiums, which crowd the surrounding streets near the church with sports fans several times a week in season.

The congregation played an important part in the early days and the organization of several American Protestant denominations at the end of the Eighteen century and the start of the Nineteenth. In the next century, the original Church of the United Brethren in Christ merged in 1946 with the former Evangelical Association, then called the Evangelical Church, to form the Evangelical United Brethren Church (E.U.B.). Meanwhile, on a parallel course, their former German and English Reformed Protestant brothers and sisters from the late 18th Century, which had formed the Methodist Episcopal Church in 1784, had evolved into several Methodist churches After cooperating with the handful of other American Methodist, splitting during the mid-19th Century, first over the role of the historic supervising office of bishops. Methodist EPISCOPAL versus Methodist PROTESTANT Churches – where the word Greek word "episkopos" is used for the supervising "bishop", and the "M.E." Church felt it was important for the Methodists to continue with whereas the opposing simpler "M.P."'s counted on more local congregational authority. Later another split, which also occurred and ripped apart most other American churches of the time, was over the issue of slavery, with the withdrawal of the Southern congregations into the Methodist Episcopal Church South. The three however unified in a celebrated historic ceremony in 1939, forming The Methodist Church.

Then 29 years later, the Methodists reached out to old German and English Reformed who had been close to them in the Colonial period, and who had merged into the E.U.B. Church in 1946, to join them in 1968 with a wider fellowship of the disciples of John (1703–1791) and Charles Wesley (1707–1788) with those that their fellow missionaries Asbury and Strawbridge cooperated and fellowshipped with two hundred years before. This was now the wider evangelical and Reformed Protestant heritage which came down to a new The United Methodist Church, which was now the second largest church body in America.

== Historic places ==
Otterbein Church was listed on the National Register of Historic Places in 1969, which is maintained by the National Park Service of the United States Department of the Interior. With the creation in the mid 2000s of the new BaltimoreCity National Heritage numerous large plaques with illustrations and text have been posted around the downtown area along with a simultaneous publication of a map and brochure plus internet website, with tour guides leading various themed tours from the "Inner Harbor" visitors center pavilion, with prominent places published about the Old Otterbein Church and its structure and religious heritage. The church proudly maintains a restored and historic 1897 Niemann pipe organ. It was the last organ built by perhaps the least known and best of American organbuilders, Henry Niemann. It is complete, original and unaltered, and in weekly use. The organ was played in recital during the Organ Historical Society Convention in July 2024.
