= Baltimore Public Works Museum =

Museum in Baltimore, Maryland, US

Coordinates: 39.2847°N 76.6033°W

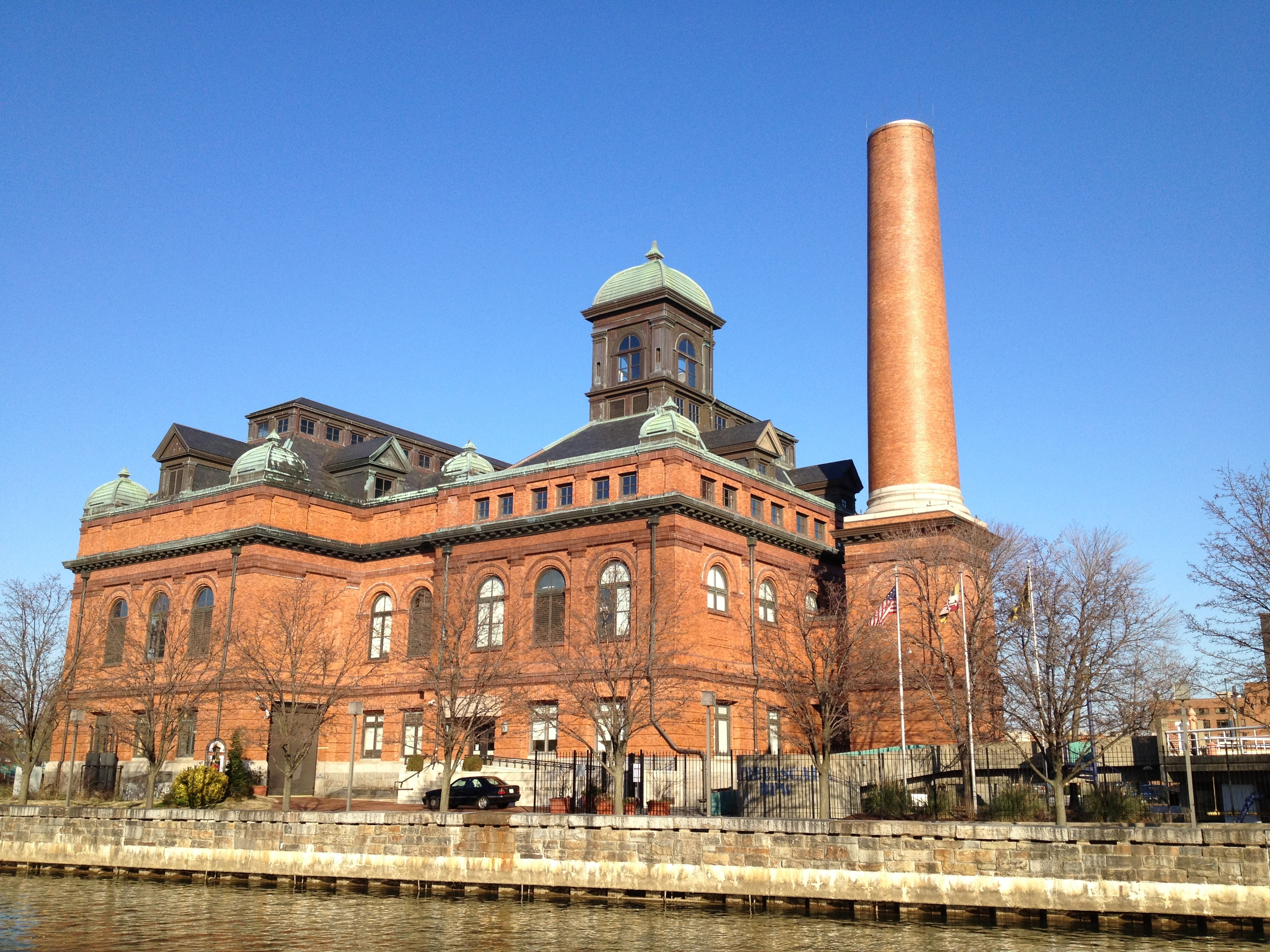
The Public Works Experience exterior. This is also the operating Eastern Avenue Pumping Station, which pumps raw sewage to the Back River sewage treatment plant.

The Baltimore Public Works Museum was located at 751 Eastern Avenue, Pier 7 of the Inner Harbor, Baltimore, Maryland. This museum provided a behind-the-scenes glimpse of how a large city provides public works utility services to its citizens. Exhibits also explained street lighting, road maintenance, and trash removal. An outdoor sculpture called Streetscape was an intricate model of a network of phone lines, street lights, storm drains and pipes for water, gas, and sewage disposal. The building housing this display is an operating sewage pumping station built in 1912.

The museum opened in 1982 and was operated under the auspices of the Baltimore Department of Public Works. On February 3, 2010, the city announced that the museum would close immediately due to budget constraints.

Since then, various efforts have been made to re-open the Baltimore Public Works Museum. Attendees of the centennial celebration event of the city's Montebello Water Filtration Plant in 2015 were given blue bags by the Baltimore City Department of Public Works that had printed on them www.PublicWorksMuseum.org, a website associated with a group called "Friends of the Public Works Museum" whose goal "is to reopen the Public Works Museum", though by 2017 that did not lead to a valid website. In 2016, the building was made a Baltimore City Landmark.

In 2018, a new effort was announced to renovate the facility and open an expanded museum called the "Public Works Experience".

The Public Works Experience Board of Directors is working to rejuvenate the museum into a hands-on, STEM-focused engagement to help visitors learn about the importance of public works. The facility is now open to the public on every Saturday, from 10am - 2pm.
