= Old West Baltimore Historic District =

Historic district in Maryland, United States

- U.S. National Register of Historic Places
- U.S. Historic district
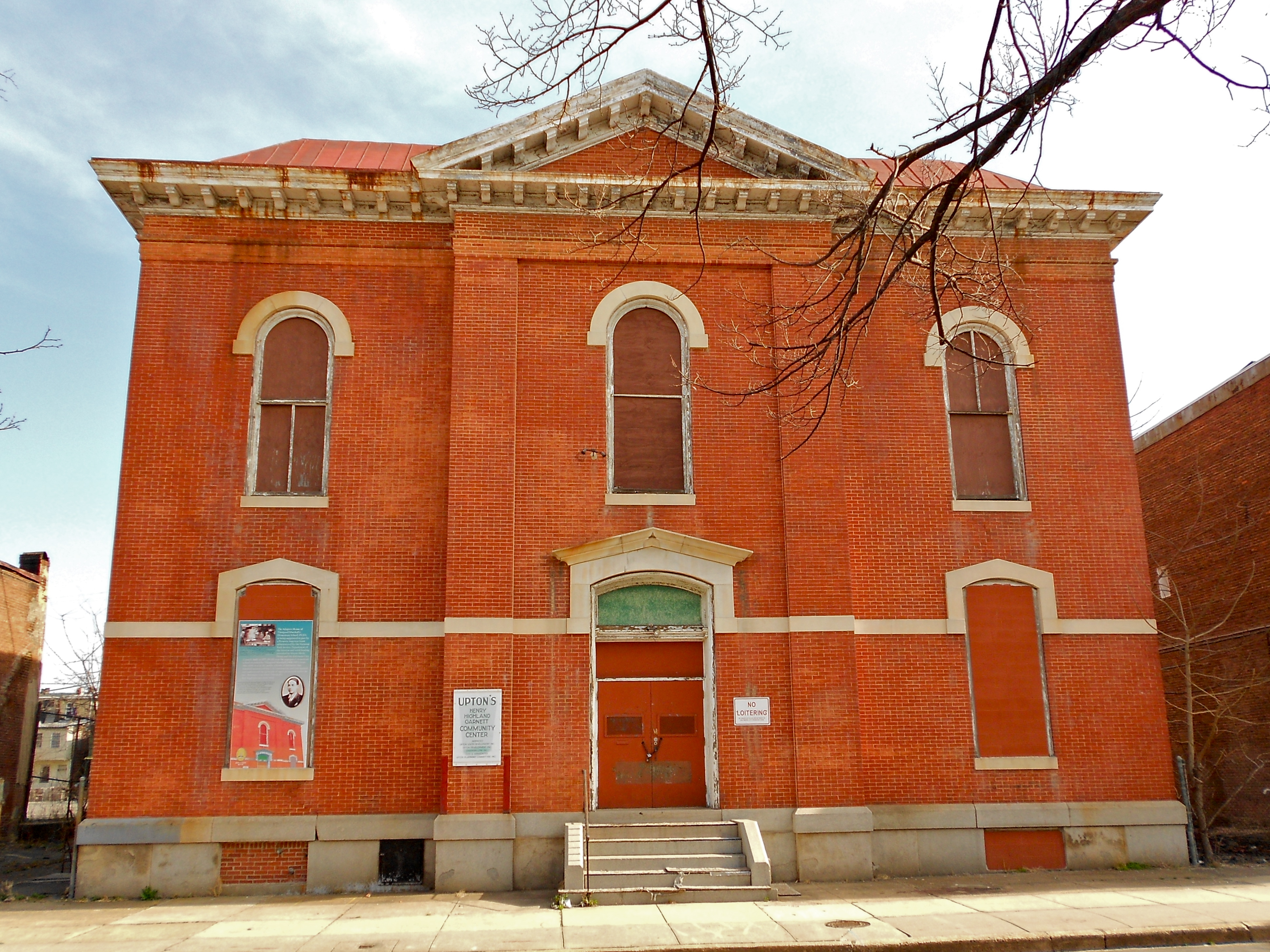
- Henry Highland Garnet School (P.S. 103) on Division Street, where Thurgood Marshall attended.

- Location within Baltimore Location within Maryland Location within the United States
- Location: Roughly bounded by North Ave., Dolphin St., Franklin St. and Fulton Ave., Baltimore, Maryland
- Coordinates: 39°18′14″N 76°38′17″W
- Area: 675 acres (273 ha)
- Architectural style: Greek Revival, Late Victorian
- NRHP reference No.: 04001374
- Added to NRHP: December 23, 2004

Old West Baltimore Historic District is a national historic district in Baltimore, Maryland, United States. It is primarily a row house neighborhood of approximately 175 city blocks directly northwest of downtown Baltimore. The district includes other housing from grand mansions to alley houses, as well as churches, public buildings (primarily schools), commercial buildings, and landscaped squares. Pennsylvania Avenue, the main street of the community, features a later 20th century municipal market house. Within the district are civic monuments that relate to Baltimore's premier historic African-American community. Such noteworthy figures as Supreme Court Justice Thurgood Marshall, Congressman Parren Mitchell, jazz artists Cab Calloway and Billie Holiday, civil rights leader Lillie Mae Carroll Jackson, and Carl Murphy, editor of the Baltimore Afro-American newspaper, lived and / or worked in the area.

Old West Baltimore Historic District was added to the National Register of Historic Places in 2004. Located in the district is the separately listed Congressman Parren J. Mitchell House.
