= History of the French in Baltimore =

The history of the French in Baltimore dates to the 18th century. The earliest wave of French immigration began in the mid-18th century, as many Acadian refugees from Canada's Maritime Provinces. The Acadians were expelled from Canada by the British, who were victorious in the French and Indian War, and in the Seven Years War in Europe. They took over French territory in North America east of the Mississippi River.

Later waves of French settlement in Baltimore from the 1790s to the early 19th century brought Roman Catholic refugees of the French Revolution and others fleeing the Haitian Revolution in the French colony of Saint-Domingue.

In the late 20th and 21st centuries, additional Creole and French speakers have immigrated to Baltimore and other US cities as refugees from Haiti. Their nation has struggled with violent political upheaval and severe natural disasters.

== Demographics ==
In 1920, 626 foreign-born White people in Baltimore spoke the French language as their mother tongue.

As of the 2000 United States census the French American community in the Baltimore metropolitan area numbered 47,234 (1.9% of the area's population); an additional 10,494 (0.4%) identified as French Canadian American. The Baltimore area's total population of French descent numbered 57,728, or 2.3% of the area's population. According to Census responses, some 5,705 people in Baltimore speak the French language (including French Creole) at home.

In the same year Baltimore city's French population (excluding Basques) was 4,721, 0.7% of the city's population. There were also 824 French-Canadians, 0.1% of the population.

As of 2011, immigrants from France were the forty-fifth largest foreign-born population in Baltimore. French (including patois and Cajun) was the fourth most common language of people who spoke English "less than very well". French Creole was the thirtieth most spoken language of people who spoke English "less than very well".

In 2013, an estimated 5,383 French-Americans resided in Baltimore city, 0.9% of the population. An additional 1,007 people, 0.2% of the population, identified as being of French-Canadian descent.

== History ==
=== Arrival of Acadian refugees ===
The French and Indian War was the North American theater of the Seven Years' War in Europe, lasting from 1754 to 1763. There was intense fighting between the troops of British America and the French inhabitants of Acadia, a colony of New France located in what are now the Canadian Maritime provinces and the U.S. state of Maine. In 1755 the British expelled the French-speaking Acadians; approximately 11,500 were exiled in total.

Most of the surviving exiled Acadians traveled to Louisiana, a French colony, where their descendants became known as Cajuns. Other refugees returned to France or resettled in Baltimore.

Ships carrying 913 Acadian refugees arrived in Maryland in November 1755. Shunned by a hostile, Francophobic population due to the war, the Acadians had to rely upon themselves to better their conditions. Drawing on their skills as fishermen, many Acadian men became sailors and longshoremen.

=== Settlement by French Catholics ===
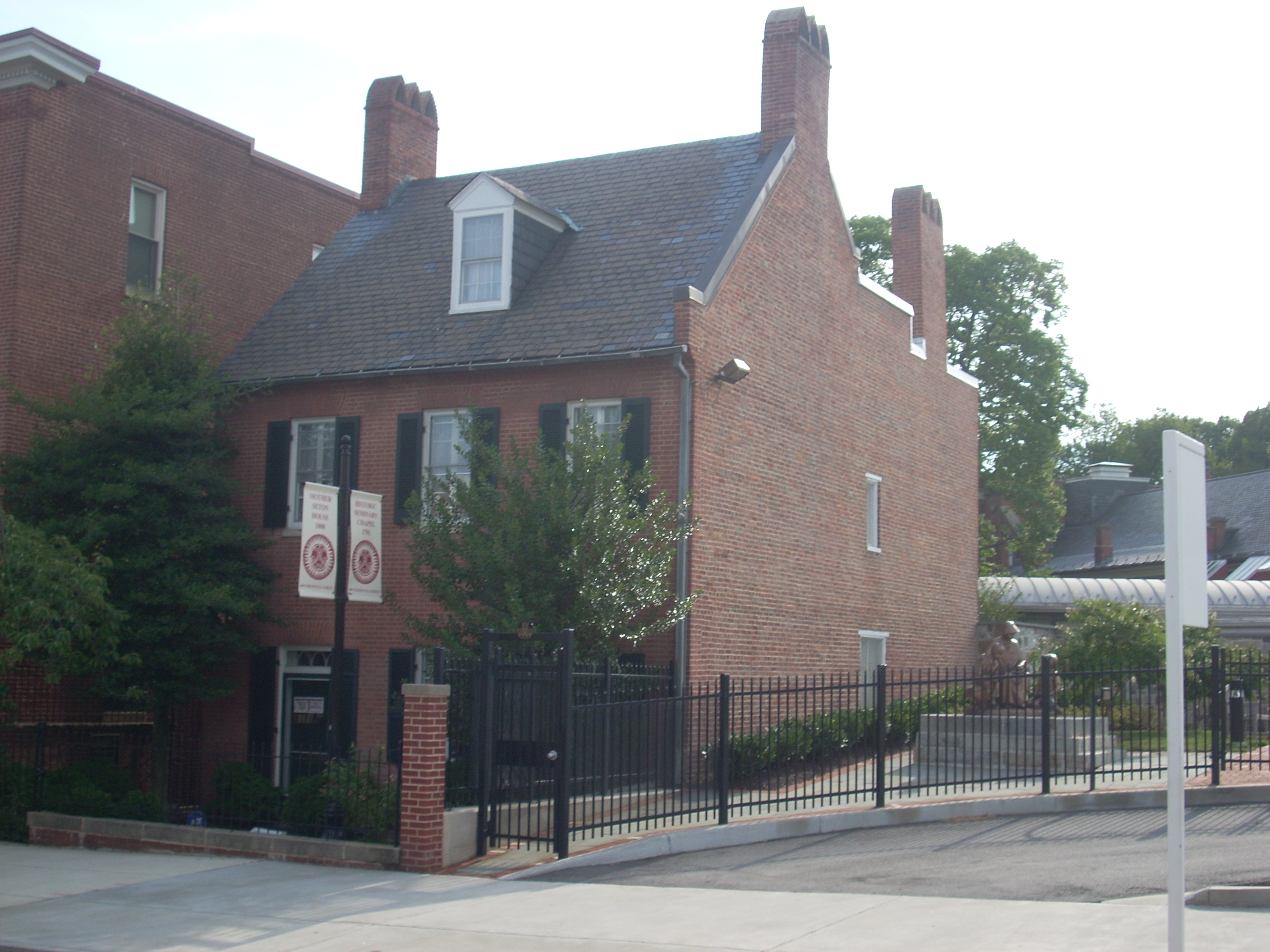
Mother Seton House, August 2011

During the French Revolution (1789–1799), many French Catholics fled France to escape its religious persecution. Among the refugees who immigrated to Baltimore were the Sulpician Fathers, a Roman Catholic teaching order. Most of the earliest Catholic institutions in Baltimore were established by these French refugees.

The Sulpician Fathers founded St. Mary's Seminary and University and St. Mary's Seminary Chapel. They also founded Catholic institutions elsewhere in Maryland, such as Mount St. Mary's University in Emmitsburg. Elizabeth Ann Seton, who was American-born, owned a home on the grounds of St. Mary's Seminary.

She later moved to Emmitsburg and established the Sisters of Charity, the first American congregation for nuns. In the 1960s Seton's home was restored to its original appearance through the efforts of a committee, which continues to operate the home as a museum. The original seminary buildings were demolished during the mid-1970s, and the campus is now part of St. Mary's Park in the Seton Hill Historic District.

=== Settlement by Franco-Haitian refugees ===
During the time of the French Revolution, there was a related slave revolt on the French colony of Saint-Domingue, on Hispaniola in the Caribbean. Enslaved people gained independence, naming their republic as Haiti.

Many French-speaking Black Catholic and white French Catholic refugees from Saint Domingue left for Baltimore. In total, 1,500 Franco-Haitians fled the island. The refugee population from Saint-Domingue was multiracial, including white Creoles and their enslaved African workers, as well as many free people of color. Some of the latter were also slaveowners.

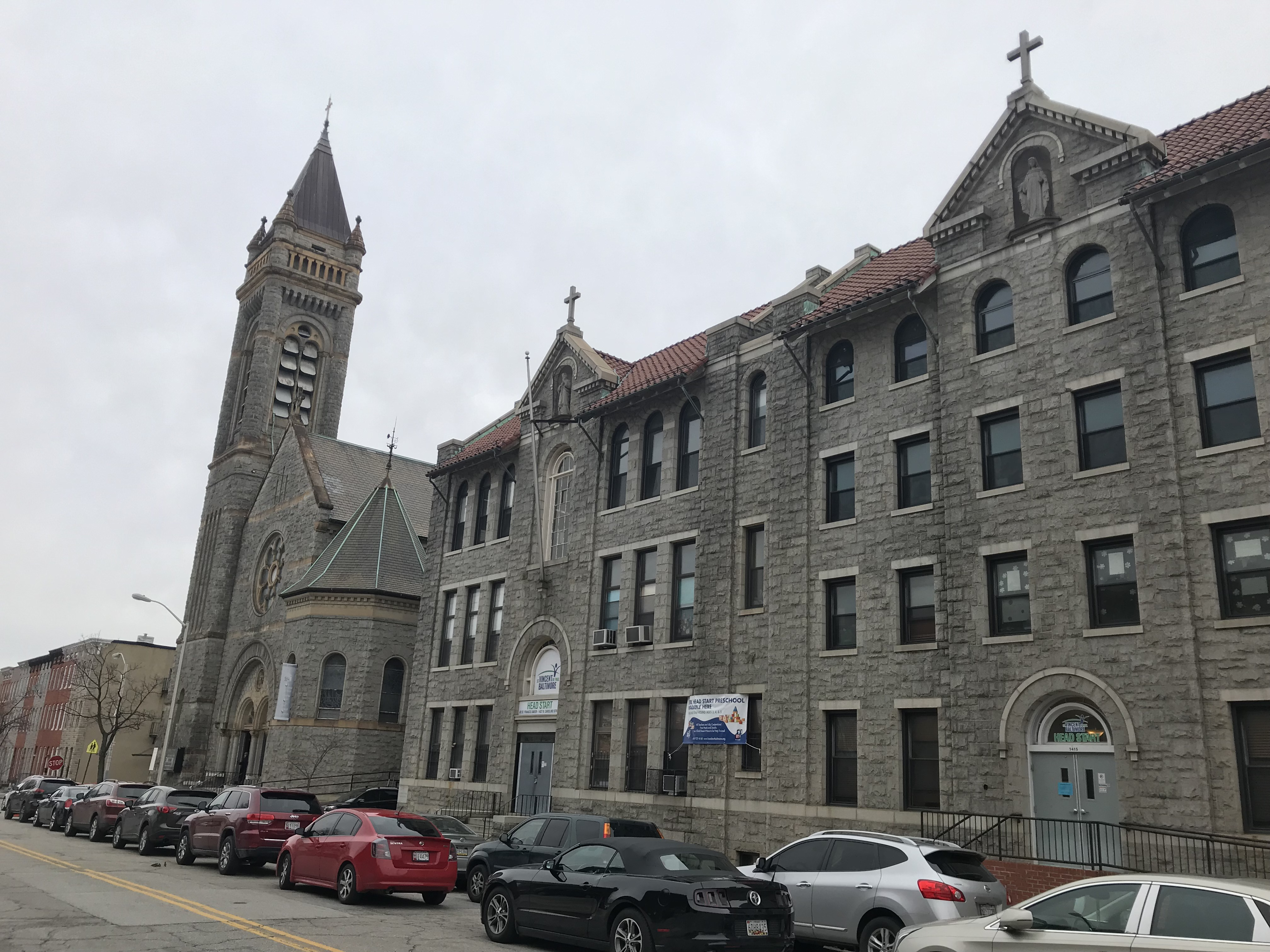
St. Francis Xavier Church in Oliver

Along with the Sulpician Fathers, some of these refugees and their descendants founded St. Francis Xavier Church. The church is the oldest historically Black Catholic church in the United States.

During the violent Haitian Revolution, the city of Baltimore passed an ordinance declaring that all enslaved persons imported by slaveholders from the West Indies, including Haiti, were "dangerous to the peace and welfare of the city". They ordered slaveowners to banish such enslaved people.

== French Town ==
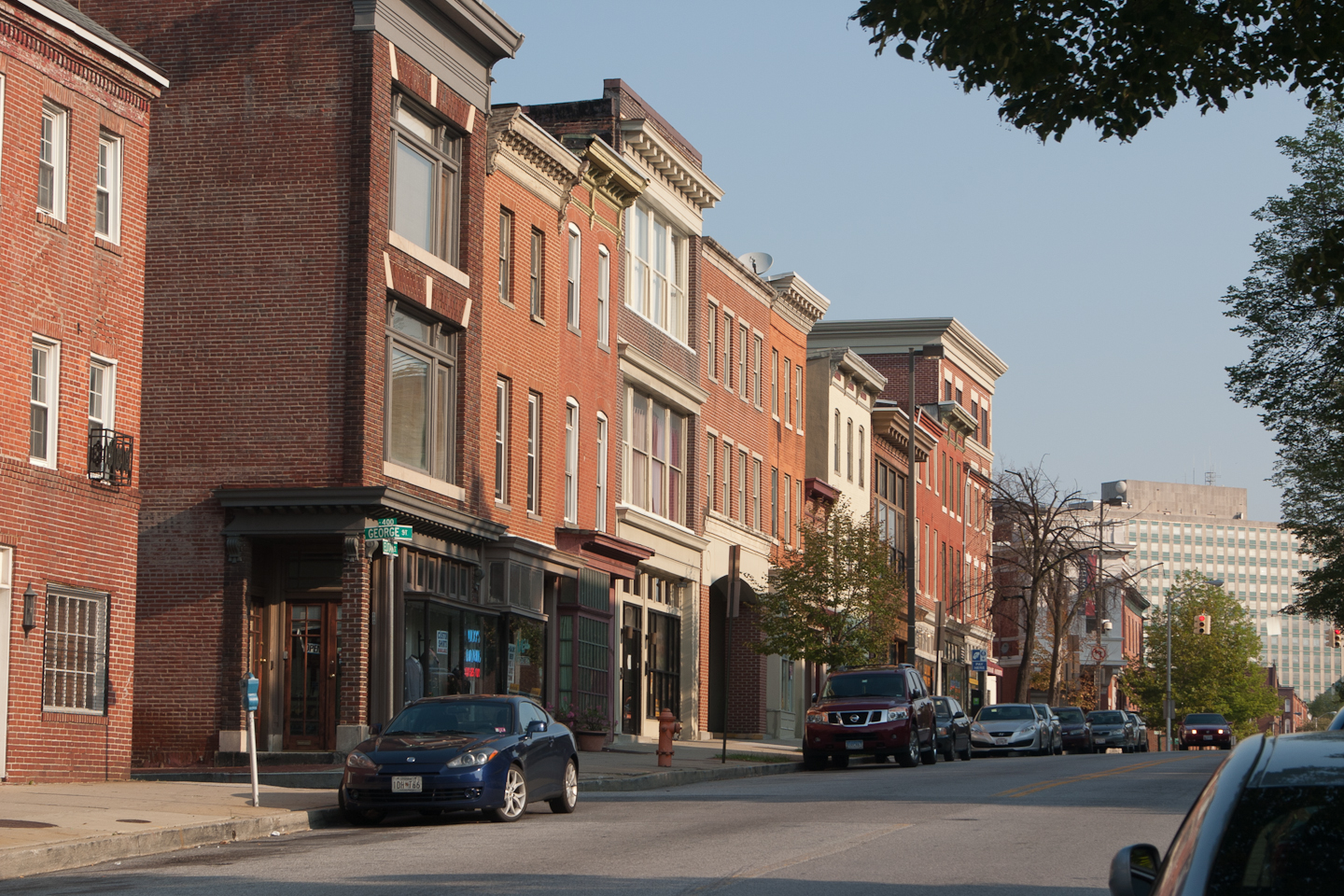
Eutaw Street in the Seton Hill Historic District, August 2011

In the 1750s, the French Acadian refugees from Nova Scotia established a community along South Charles Street near Lombard Street that was known as "French Town". By the 1830s the Acadian presence in Baltimore had appeared to decline with assimilation or relocation; French Town also disappeared as an ethnic community.

The area that was formerly known as Frenchtown is now designated as the Seton Hill Historic District.

== Culture ==
An annual French Fair is held in Seton Hill. In 2014 it was on 11 October, from 12 to 5 in Saint Mary's Park. The Seton Hill Association hosts the fair to celebrate the neighborhood as Baltimore's former French Quarter. The Fair highlights city living and vendors of French themed food, and also presents several music performers. Other activities have included hula hooping on the central green, petanque in the park, a flea and craft market, Art on the Fence, and a kids' corner for building and entertainments.

The Baltimore French School was founded in 1990 by a French immigrant who teaches the French language at Johns Hopkins University and the Peabody Conservatory.

== Notable French-Americans ==
=== Bonaparte family in Baltimore ===
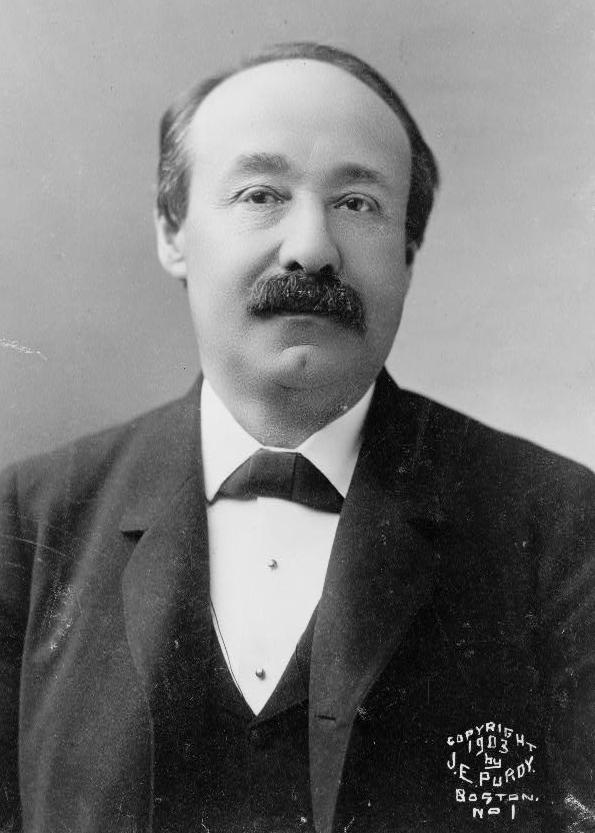
Charles Joseph Bonaparte, a lawyer and politician who served in the Cabinet of President Theodore Roosevelt. He was the son of Jérôme Napoleon Bonaparte, from whom the American line of the Bonaparte family descended, and a grandson of Jérôme Bonaparte, the youngest brother of Emperor Napoleon I.

A line of the Bonaparte family has lived in Baltimore. Napoleon's brother Jérôme traveled to Baltimore to meet a man he had befriended in the French Navy. There he met his future wife, Elizabeth Patterson, also known as Betsy. They were married by the archbishop of Baltimore in the Baltimore Cathedral on Christmas Eve of 1803. Napoleon had the marriage annulled and Jérôme was forced to return to France. Betsy Bonaparte continued to live in Baltimore with their son, also named Jérôme.

His son Charles Bonaparte was a lawyer and politician who served as Secretary of the Navy and later the Attorney General of the United States. During his tenure as Attorney General, he oversaw the creation of the Federal Bureau of Investigation.

=== Other notable people ===
- Julie Bowen, an actress.
- John J. Chanche, the first Roman Catholic Bishop of Natchez, Mississippi, serving from 1841 to 1852.
- Cipriano Ferrandini, an immigrant from Corsica and long-time barber/hairdresser at Barnum's Hotel in Baltimore.
- Maximilian Godefroy, an architect and civil engineer.
- Sidney Lanier, a musician, poet and author.
- Michael Levadoux, a French Sulpician immigrant who was among the founders of St. Mary's Seminary in Baltimore.
- Ambrose Maréchal, a prelate of the Roman Catholic Church who served as the third Archbishop of the Archdiocese of Baltimore.
- Alphonse Magnien, the superior at St. Mary's Seminary and University from 1878 to 1902.
- Jean Baptiste Ricord, a physician and naturalist.
- Elizabeth Ann Seton, the first native-born citizen of the United States to be canonized by the Roman Catholic Church.
- Frank Zappa, a musician, bandleader, songwriter, composer, recording engineer, record producer, and film director.

== See also ==
- Ethnic groups in Baltimore
- History of Baltimore
