= Seton Hill =

Seton Hill may refer to:

- Seton Hill, Baltimore, a neighborhood and historic district in central Baltimore, Maryland, USA
- Seton Hill University, a private Catholic university in Greensburg, Pennsylvania, USA

== See also ==
- Seton Hall University, a private Catholic university in South Orange, New Jersey
