= Seal of Baltimore =

Seal of Baltimore, Maryland
- Armiger: City of Baltimore
- Adopted: 1827
- Torse: "CITY OF BALTIMORE - 1797"
- Shield: Battle Monument
- Use: To represent the city and to authenticate certain edicts and documents.

The Seal of Baltimore is the official government emblem of the city of Baltimore, Maryland. The current City Seal was adopted for use in 1827, possibly inspired by a famous speech and toast made by sixth President John Quincy Adams, on a visit and tour in 1827, in which he dubbed the city with its most well-known nickname of "The Monumental City", with the recent erection of several monuments, including this for the War of 1812 and the new Washington Monument column, nearing completion in a wooded park, just north of the booming city.

== Image ==
The seal is in the shape of an ellipse with the image of the Battle Monument featured in its center. The iconic monument was designed by Frenchman J. Maximilian Godefroy, (1765-c.1838). It was erected 1815–1822, in the former colonial era Courthouse Square (where the Declaration of Independence had been read to the town populace on July 29, 1776). It commemorates the casualties suffered during the War of 1812 when the British invaded with a land/sea attack in September 1814, in the Battle of Baltimore. The land conflict was southeast of the city on the Patapsco Neck peninsula with several thousand of the King's Army at the Battle of North Point. Subsequently there was a Royal Navy fleet blockade and bombardment of Fort McHenry, south of the town, protecting the entrance to the Patapsco River of Baltimore harbor.

== Inscription ==
Around the inner edge of the ellipse of the City Seal are the words CITY OF BALTIMORE, while under the image of the Battle Monument is the year "1797", the year in which the city was first incorporated (although the port was designated in 1706, founded as a town 1729, and laid out in 1730, and separated from surrounding Baltimore County as an independent city in 1851). Color versions of the seal are in black and gold, representative of the colors of the coat of arms of the Calvert family. The then chief member of whom, Cecilius Calvert, second Lord Baltimore, (1605-1675), founded the colony Province of Maryland in 1634, and planned / arranged for its settlement, sending his younger brother Leonard Calvert, (1606-1647), with the first expedition as colonial proprietary governor, carrying forward the original grant and charter made first to his father, George Calvert, first Lord Baltimore, (1579-1632), by his friend King Charles I (1600-1649)/[reigned 1625-1649], in 1632, before his untimely early death that year. The King also bestowed on him for his services to the Crown as Secretary of State, the title of nobility for a town in Ireland, also named Baltimore.

== Engraving ==
The Seal was engraved on a metal die and placed in a wood-frame structure in the offices of the Department of Legislative Reference at the historic Baltimore City Hall. It was used to make embossed impressions on official documents and also used as an emblem on various city properties / signs / publications and vehicles. It was supplemented in the 2010s, under 49th Mayor Stephanie Rawlings-Blake by an official City Logo of a round design with the Battle Monument image superimposed on the black and gold/yellow chevrons from two of the four quarters of the Calvert family / Lord Baltimore's shield of his coat-of-arms (also used as the Maryland state flag), as used on the later designed city flag. It is considered one of the most striking, beautiful and attractive municipal or state flags in the nation. This more colorful round City Logo was also circled by the words - "CITY OF BALTIMORE", but with no "1797" date at the bottom.

== See also ==
- Flag of Baltimore
