= Flag of Baltimore =

Baltimore, Maryland
- Proportion: 2:3
- Adopted: February 11, 1915
- Design: Paly of six Or and sable, a bend counterchanged, on an inescutcheon Sable, within an orle of the first, a representation of Baltimore's Battle Monument (from the War of 1812, constructed 1815-1822), Argent.
- Designed by: Judge Henry Stockbridge; Carroll Lucas; Wilbur F. Coyle; Hester Dorsey Richardson

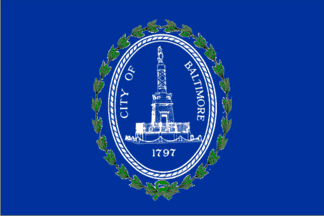
Flag of Baltimore 1899–1915

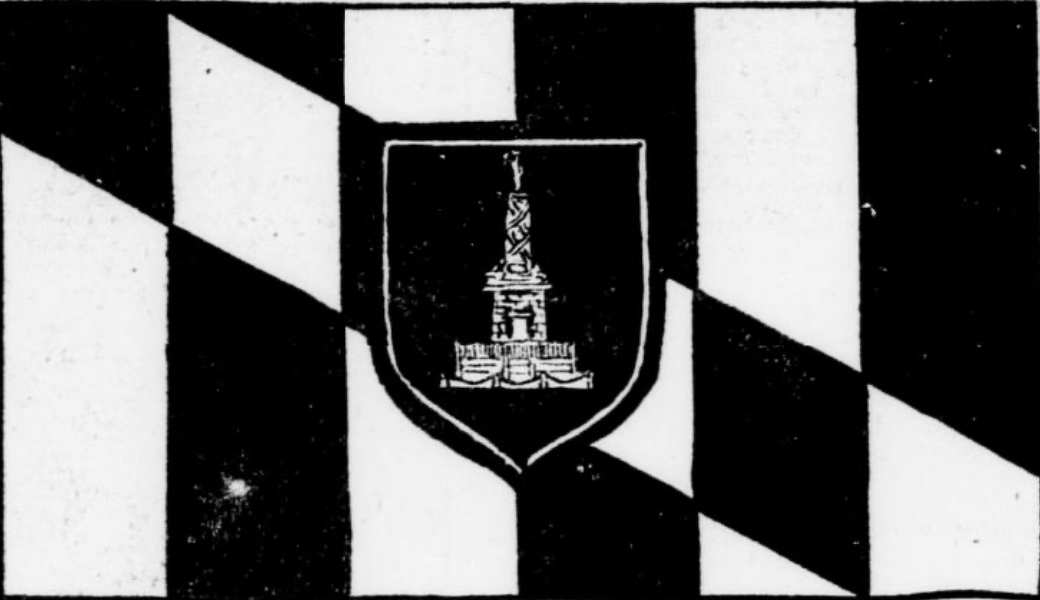
illustration of the city's flag from 1925

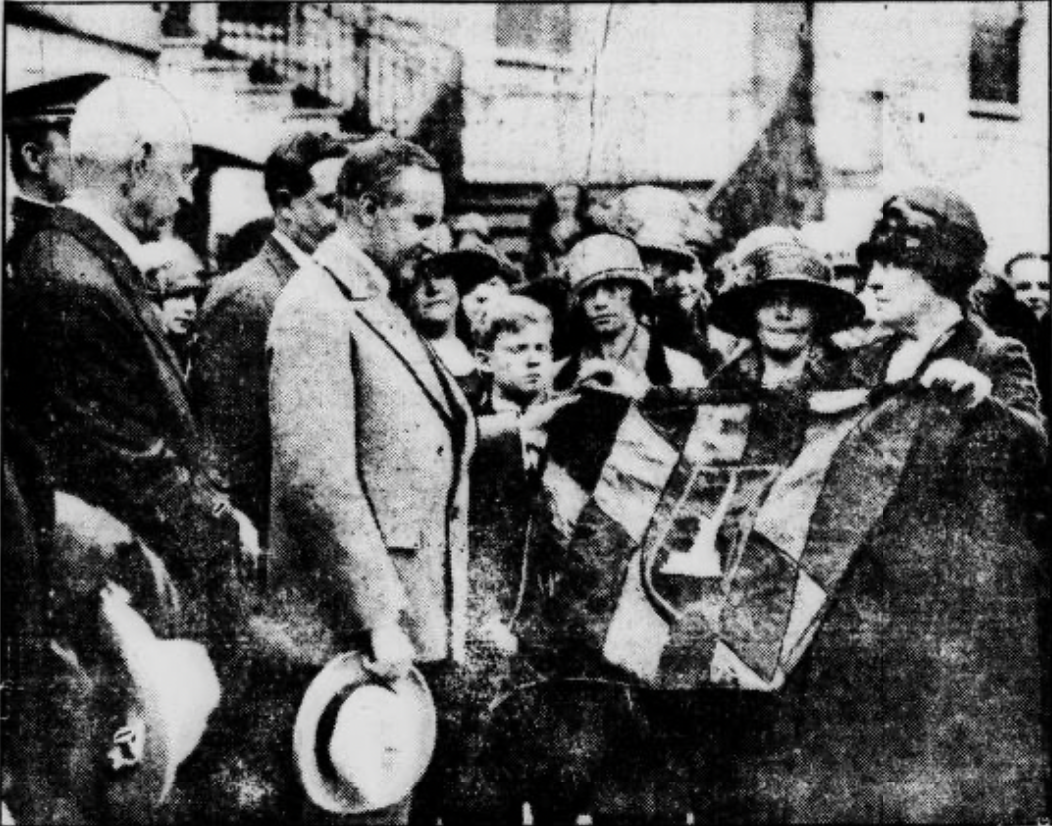
City flag from 1926

The flag of Baltimore features the "Battle Monument" (which is also the central motif on the city's seal). The design was by French emigre architect Maximilian Godefroy.

The monument commemorates the soldiers and officers that fell in the defense of the city against the British land and sea attack in the Battle of Baltimore with the Battle of North Point and subsequent Bombardment of Fort McHenry from September 12th to 14th, 1814, during the War of 1812.

The field is in the Calvert family colors of black and yellow / gold (sometimes orange) and design, which also appear in the first and fourth quarters of the Maryland state flag taken from the shield of the Calvert-Crossland families coats-of-arms.

The flag is blazoned (described in heraldic) terms as follows: Paly of six Or and sable, a bend counterchanged, on an inescutcheon Sable, within an orle of the first, a representation of Baltimore's Battle Monument Argent. Two other designs were submitted for consideration; both included the Battle Monument and the Calvert arms.

Respondents to a 2004 survey sponsored by the North American Vexillological Association rated the Baltimore city flag 7.46 on a 10-point scale, making it the 18th best American city flag in the 150 flag survey of American cities.

== See also ==
- Seal of Baltimore
