= Seton Hill, Baltimore =

- Seton Hill Historic District
- U.S. National Register of Historic Places
- U.S. Historic district
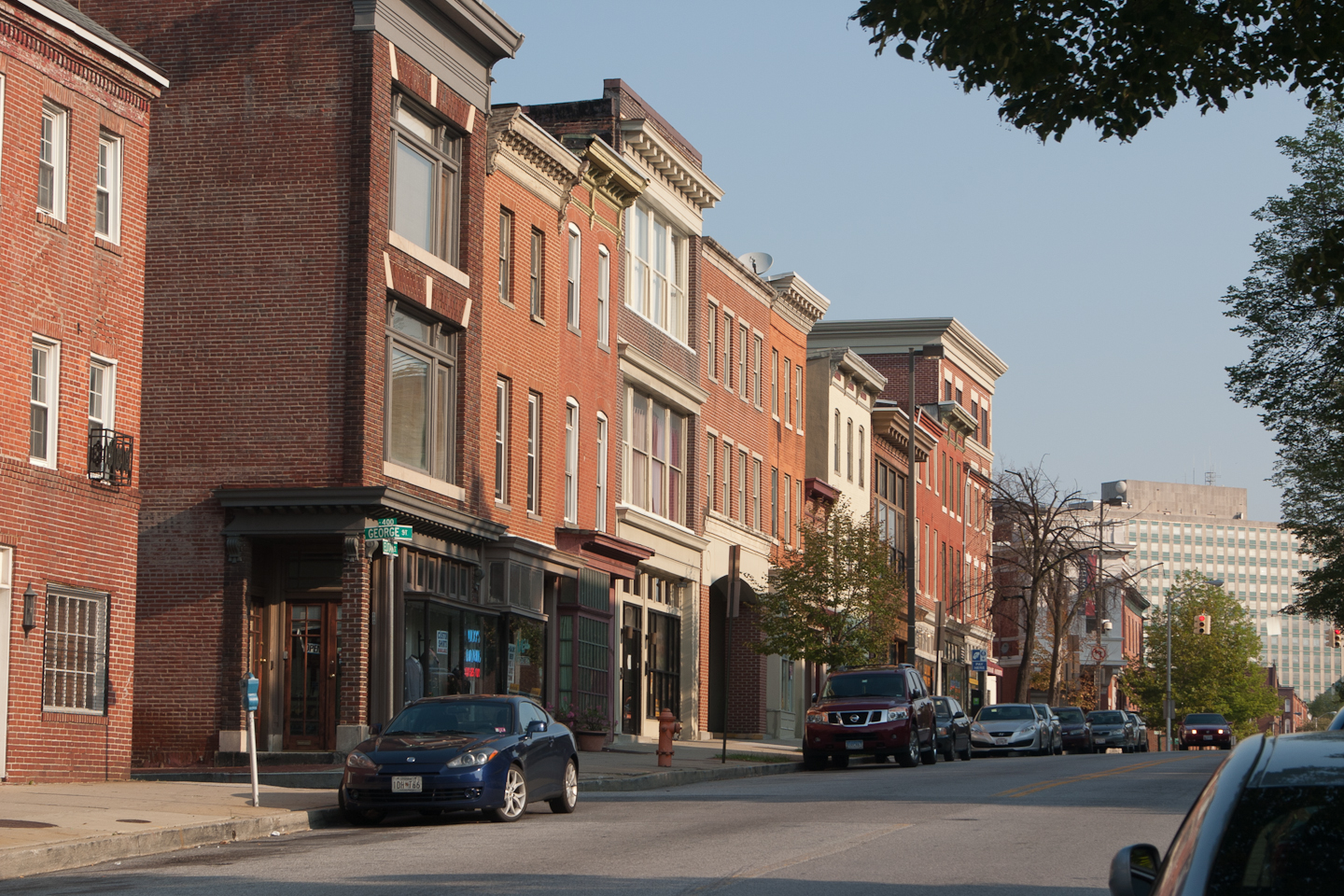
- Eutaw Street in the Seton Hill Historic District, August 2011

- Location within Baltimore Location within Maryland Location within the United States
- Location: Bounded by Pennsylvania Ave., Franklin, Eutaw, McCulloh, and Orchard Sts., Baltimore, Maryland
- Coordinates: 39°17′47″N 76°37′24″W
- Area: 25 acres (10 ha)
- Built: 1800
- Architect: Multiple
- NRHP reference No.: 75002099
- Added to NRHP: July 30, 1975

Seton Hill Historic District is a historic district in Baltimore, Maryland. It was listed on the National Register of Historic Places in 1975.

It includes St. Mary's Seminary Chapel, which is a National Historic Landmark. It also includes Mother Seton House, briefly home of St. Elizabeth Ann Seton, separately listed on the National Register.

Seton Hill, Baltimore's former second French Quarter, is centered on the former St. Mary's Seminary and College, which was founded around 1791 by Sulpician priests who fled the French Revolution (1789-1795). Today Saint Mary's Park occupies the area where the former Seminary and College buildings once stood.

The neighborhood was designated in 1968 as an Historic and Architectural Preservation District of Baltimore City, and was placed on the National Register of Historic Places in 1975. Saint Mary's Park, the heart of Seton Hill, is the largest open green space in downtown Baltimore on its Westside.

In 1790, the first Roman Catholic prelate ordained for the new United States, Bishop John Carroll, met with Father Nagot of the Order of St. Sulpice and agreed to a plan to establish the Sulpician Order in Maryland. A year later priests of the order sailed across the Atlantic Ocean. Fathers Nagot, Tessier, Garnier, and Levadoux opened the Sulpician headquarters in the old One Mile Tavern, then located at West Franklin Street and the Hookstown Road (known today as Pennsylvania Avenue).

The Sulpicians soon purchased the inn, adapting it as a small seminary. In following years they completed an extensive college and seminary complex along North Paca Street. Some Seminary structures were built by 1806. A second, replacement group of buildings was erected in the 1870s. St. Mary's became the first Roman Catholic seminary in the United States.

In 1966 the seminary celebrated its 175th anniversary at its Paca Street campus, which had primarily Victorian architecture. As needs changed, these buildings were demolished in 1970 to create St. Mary's Park.

The seminary had moved from this enclave in 1929 for its expansive campus developed at Roland Avenue and Northern Parkway in the Roland Park neighborhood of North Baltimore. The buildings there were designed in the Beaux Arts / Classical Revival style. The seminary celebrated its Bicentennial there in 1991.

The only original St. Mary's academic structure remaining at Seton Hill is a particularly significant building, a small red brick chapel, known as the Chapel of Our Lady of the Presentation, which was dedicated in 1808. This structure, designed by J. Maximilen M. Godefroy, a prominent architect of the time and teacher at the secular college attached to the seminary, is one of the oldest remaining example of Gothic Revival architecture in the U.S.

Godefroy, who was born in France, also designed several other structures: these include the city's War of 1812 memorial to its casualties of the Battle of Baltimore during the British attack in September 1814.

The landmark Battle Monument (1815-1822), situated at Courthouse Square on North Calvert Street, between East Fayette and East Lexington streets, commemorates the Battle of North Point in southeast Baltimore County. The Royal Navy bombarded Fort McHenry, which guarded the Baltimore Harbor & Port. Since 1827 the monument has served as a symbol of the city: it appears on the municipal seal, and city flag and logo.

Another contributing structure to the historic district is the First Unitarian and Universalist Church at West Franklin & North Charles streets, built in 1817.

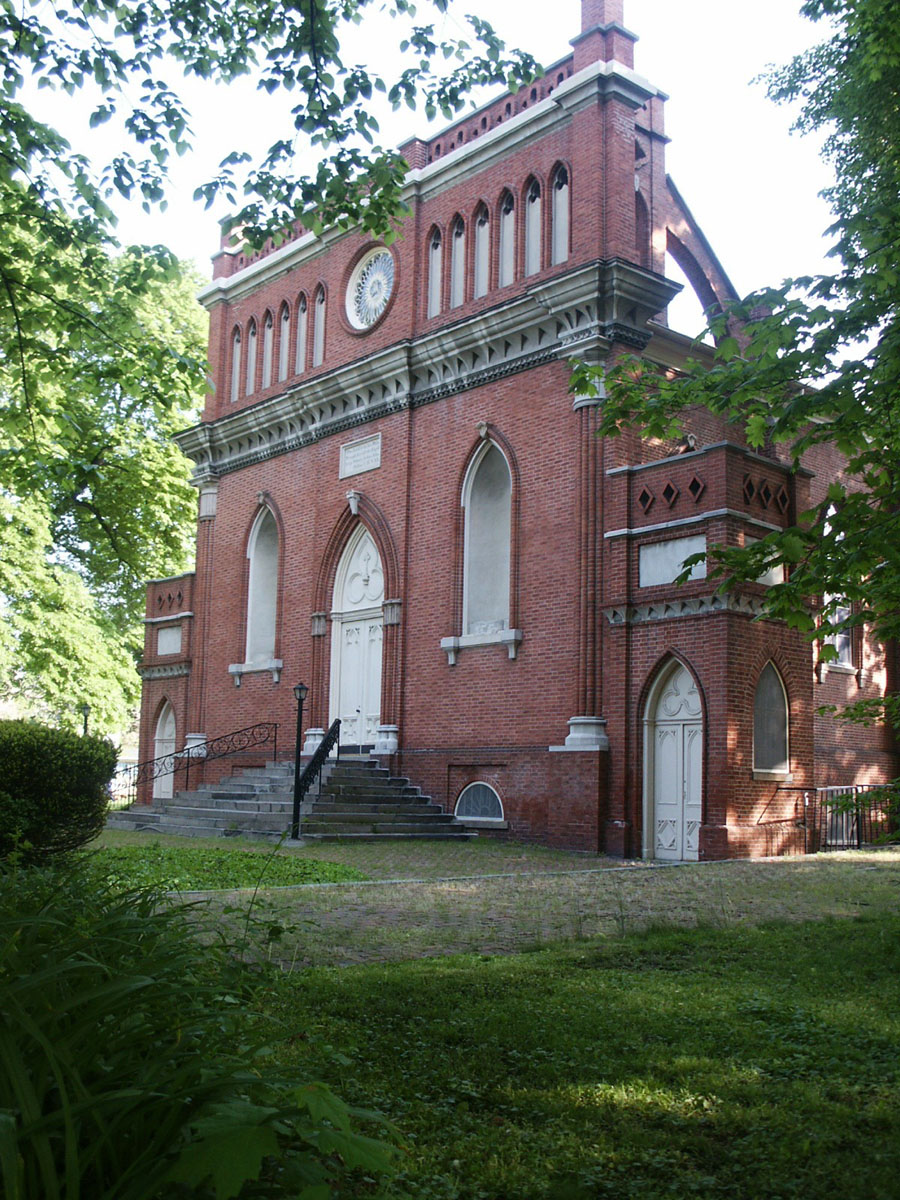
Chapel of the former Seminary

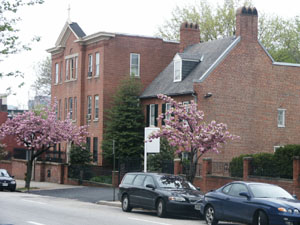
Mother Seton House
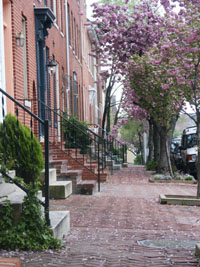
Paca Street

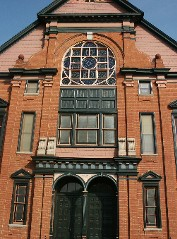
Orchard Street Church

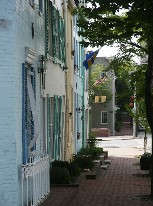
Druid Hill Ave

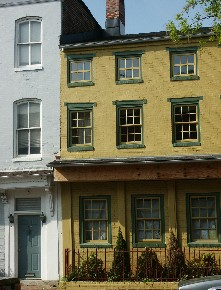
Druid Hill Ave home
