= Merchants' Exchange Building (Baltimore) =

Multipurpose structure, ~1815–~1902

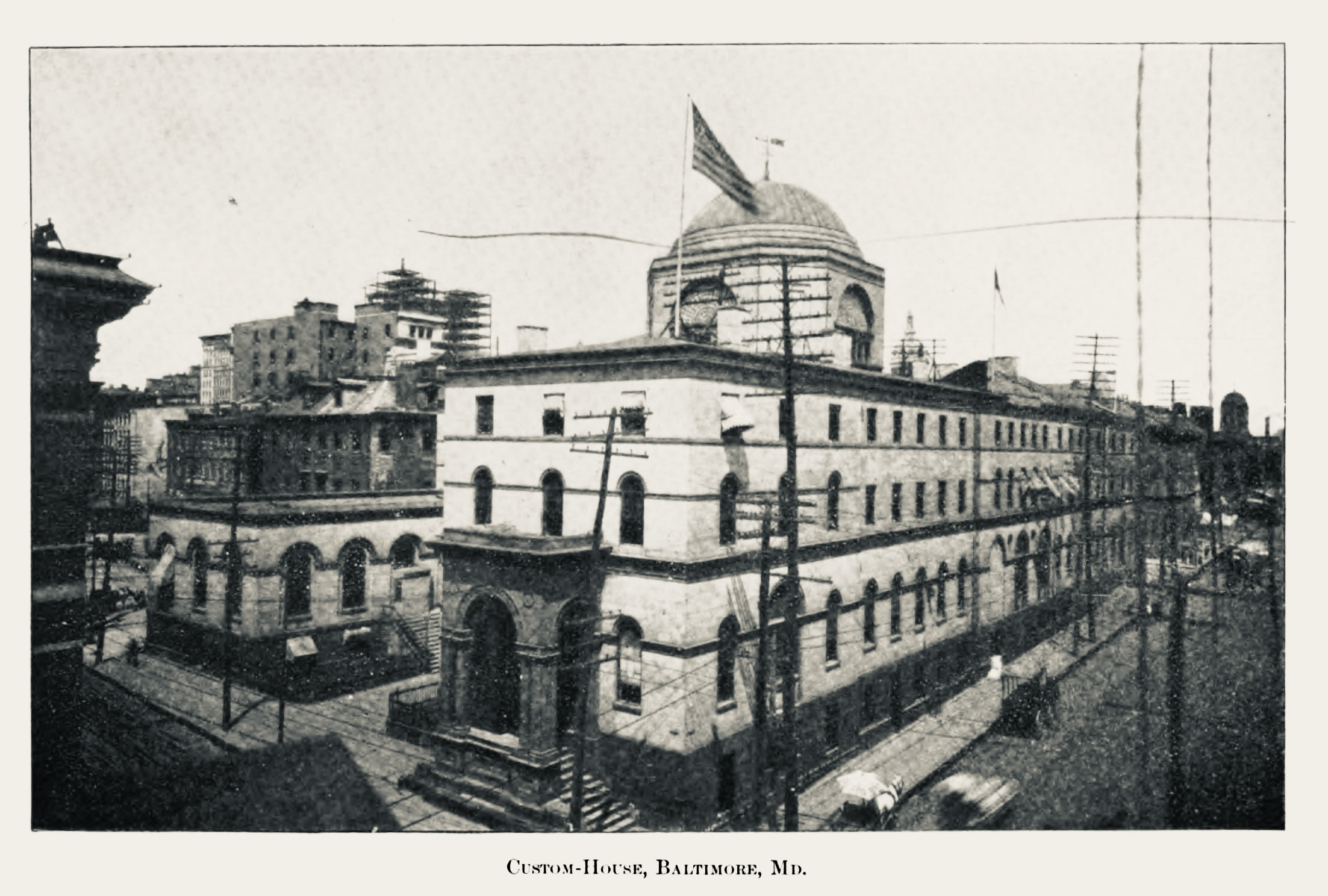
- Merchants' Exchange Building, Baltimore c. 1901
- Interactive map of the Merchants' Exchange Building area
- Alternative names: Baltimore Custom House, Old Custom House

General information
- Architectural style: "Greco-Roman" (American Neoclassical)
- Coordinates: 39.2886°N 76.6088°W
- Year built: 1815–1820
- Demolished: 1901–1902
- Cost: $200,000

Technical details
- Size: 1,275,610 ft3

Design and construction
- Architects: Benjamin Henry Latrobe, Maximilian Godefroy

The Baltimore Exchange Building, also known as the first Baltimore Custom House, the Merchants' Exchange Building, and the Baltimore Government Building was a structure in Maryland, United States that housed an eclectic array of commercial enterprises and government offices during the 19th century. The Merchants' Exchange Building site was bounded by Water Street, Gay Street, and Lombard Street.

== Construction ==
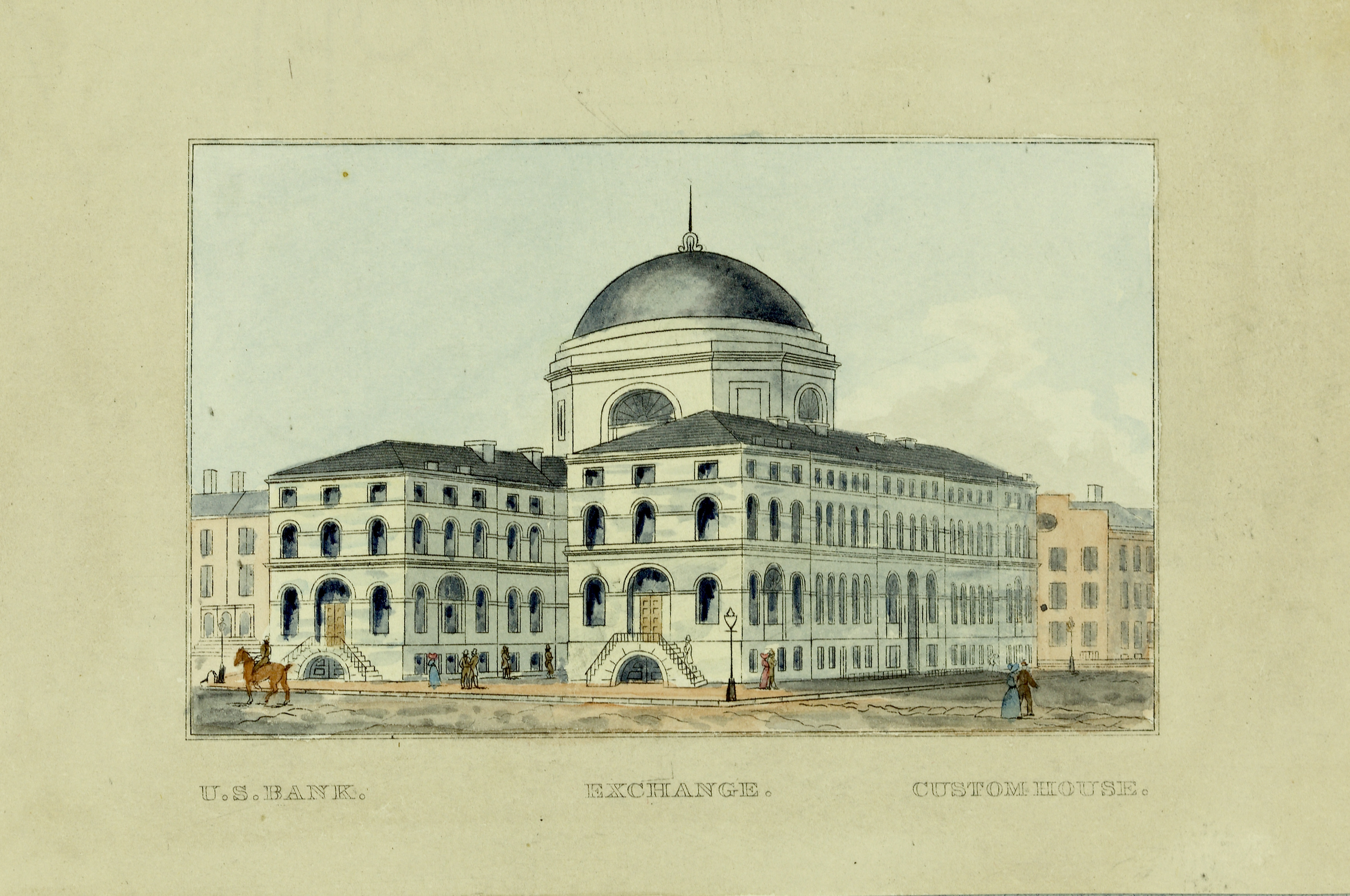
"U.S. Bank - Exchange - Custom House" from Picture of Baltimore (1832) by John H. B. Latrobe via Johns Hopkins Digital Library

The H-shaped Exchange Building was designed by Benjamin Latrobe and Maximilian Godefroy, and constructed under the supervision of Jacob Small beginning in 1815. The U.S. government paid for the erection of the custom-house wing in 1817. The building opened to the public in 1820.

== 1830s and 1840s ==
The Irish comedic actor Tyrone Power visited Baltimore in the 1830s and described the building as a handsome failure:

The Merchants' Hall (usually called the Merchants Exchange) built by private subscription, has been a great failure with regard to the value of the stock. It is a noble building and of grand dimensions; the front being 255 feet by a depth of 140, having four stories, including the ground floor. The great hall, where the merchants daily assemble, is 86 by 53 feet, and lighted from the dome, whose summit is 90 feet from the floor. The sides of the hall are supported by columns of marble; each being a single block. An excellent newsroom, custom-house, and other public offices, adjoin. It was only built ten years since, at an expence of 200,000 dollars; but the original subscribers have sunk most of their money, from that part of the build ing which was constructed for letting out to shopkeepers and lawyers being unoccupied.

An 1845 advertisement marketing the hotel within the building promised "large and airy" rooms, and that it was "located convenient to all the PRINCIPAL STEAMBOAT LANDINGS and RAILROAD DEPOTS."

== Property of the federal government ==
In its day it was "the most important structure in Baltimore," even hosting the offices of Baltimore City Hall for a time. The federal government acquired most (but not all) of the building with purchases in 1853 and 1857. Before the American Civil War there was a hotel on the Gay Street side. In 1884 a newspaper reporter interviewed an old American slave trader named Jack Campbell, and asked if he knew of any surviving remnants of the slave trade in the United States, and Campbell replied, "More than you'd think...Go into any Southern hotel that was built before the war and ask them to let you go down into the cellars. See if you don't find these old cells where the servants of travelers were shut up at night. The Baltimore Custom House was once a hotel, and there are more than two dozen cells under it now."

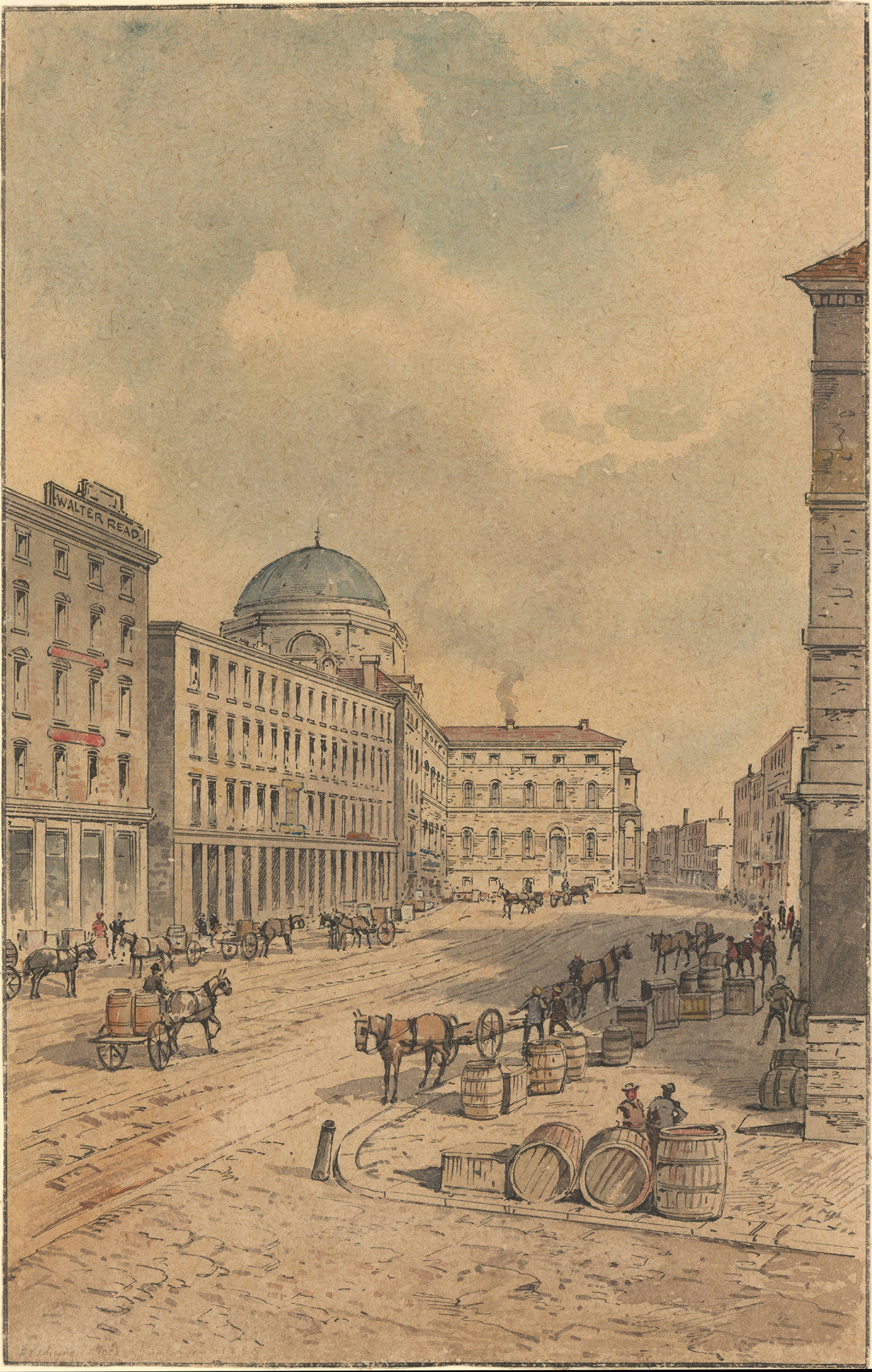
Exchange Place, Baltimore, 1855 (Cator Collection via Digital Maryland)

== Funeral procession of Abraham Lincoln ==
Abraham Lincoln's body lay under the dome on April 21, 1865, during his multi-day funeral procession from Washington, D.C. to Springfield, Illinois. According to a history of U.S. federal buildings, the dome was "decorated with paintings of the Maryland coat of arms and seals, and representations of commerce and the 'Dignity of the United States,' and supported by 12 Ionic marble columns, quarried, cut, and polished in Italy."

== Post office building ==
Circa 1869, a directory of Baltimore described the Merchants' Exchange, located on Second and Gay Streets, and Exchange Place, as "a large and elegant structure...The whole is surmounted by an immense dome, the apex of which is 115 feet above the street. In the reading room, newspapers from all parts of the world may be found." Part of the building housed the post office, and the customs office occupied the south wing, at Gay and Lombard. Circa 1874, the building hosted the offices of the U.S. customs collector, U.S. surveyor, and the U.S. internal revenue office.

== Demolition ==
At the turn of the century, it was "heated by hot water, open grates, and stoves. The number of rooms occupied is fifty-eight, assigned principally to the customs service, pension office, subtreasury, civil service, and Light-House Board." The building was demolished in 1901 or 1902, and replaced with the new Customs House.

== See also ==
- List of United States federal courthouses in Maryland
