= St. Mary's Seminary Chapel =

Historic church in Maryland, US

- U.S. National Register of Historic Places
- U.S. National Historic Landmark
- Baltimore City Landmark
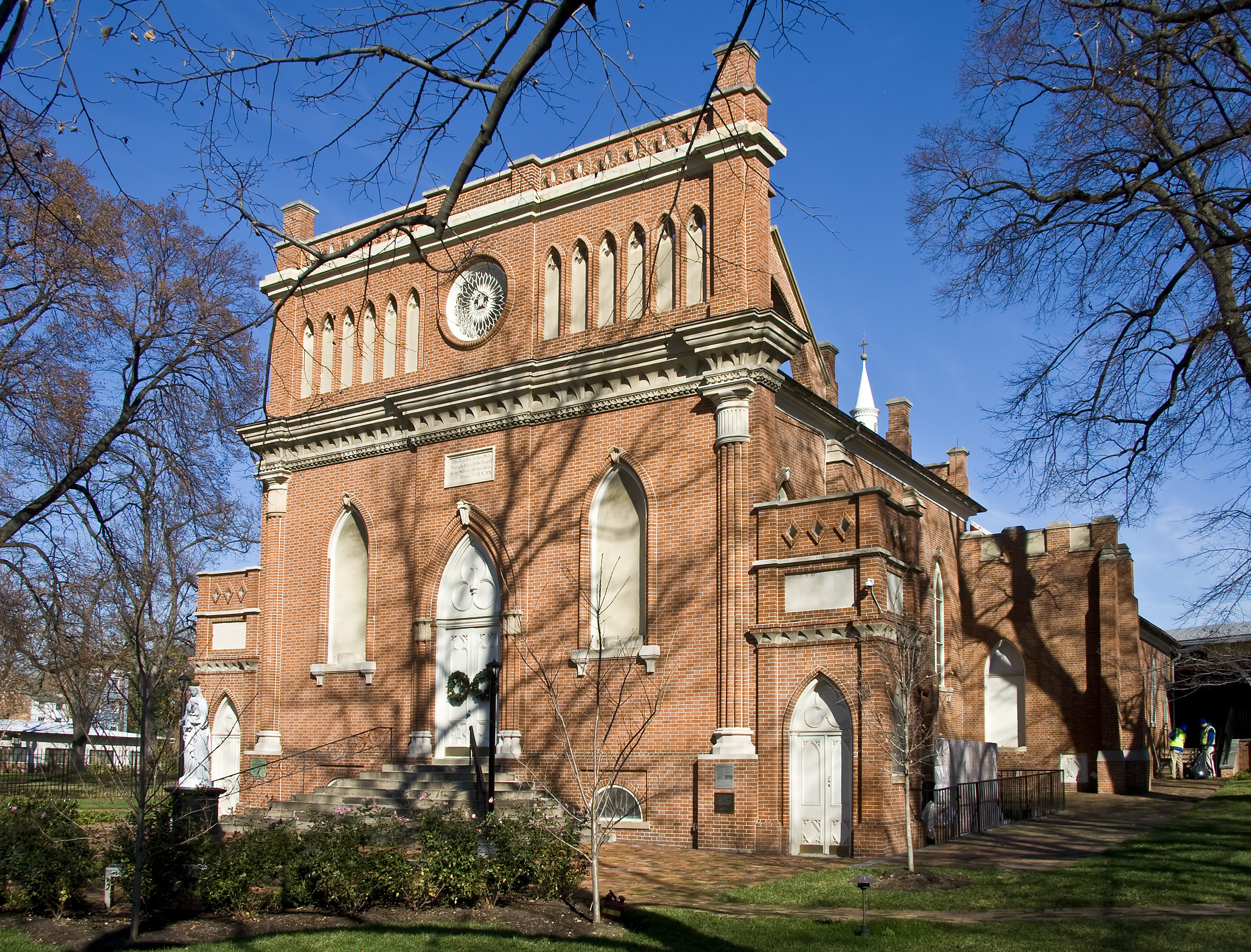
- St. Mary's Seminary Chapel, December 2011
- Interactive map of St. Mary's Seminary Chapel
- Location: 600 N. Paca St., Baltimore, Maryland
- Coordinates: 39°17′44.9″N 76°37′24.6″W
- Area: 6.5 acres (2.6 ha)
- Built: 1806–1808
- Architect: Maximilien Godefroy
- Architectural style: Gothic Revival
- NRHP reference No.: 71001046

Significant dates
- Added to NRHP: November 11, 1971
- Designated NHL: November 11, 1971
- Designated BCL: 1975

St. Mary's Seminary Chapel is a Catholic church located at 600 North Paca Street (off Druid Hill Avenue and modern Martin Luther King, Jr. Boulevard) in the Seton Hill neighborhood of Baltimore, Maryland. It was built in the Neo-Gothic style. It was built from 1806 through 1808 by French architect J. Maximilian M. Godefroy for the French Sulpician priests of St. Mary's Seminary. Godefroy claimed that his design was the first Gothic building in America.

== History ==
St. Mary's Seminary (now St. Mary's Seminary and University), founded in 1791, is the oldest Catholic seminary in the United States and the site also included a secular St. Mary's College, from 1805-1852. Godefroy also designed in Baltimore, the First Unitarian Church at West Franklin and North Charles Streets during 1817 and the Battle Monument, constructed 1815-1822 in the old Courthouse Square at North Calvert Street, between East Lexington and East Fayette Streets, commemorating the city's dead during the British attack in the War of 1812's Battle of Baltimore with the bombardment of Fort McHenry and the Battle of North Point in September 1814.

The chapel is located adjacent to the Mother Seton House. Originally the chapel was surrounded by a quadrangle of four-story buildings of brick Georgian/Federal design with peaked roofs and dormer windows. On one side was a long seminary building and on the other was an L-shaped larger, but similar architectured structure built for the secular College, after it was established in 1805. These were later replaced on the same site by buildings in 1876-78 of Victorian/Second Empire style with mansard roofs although the central chapel of Godefroy endured. In the 1970s, the Victorian buildings were unfortunately also razed leaving St. Mary's Park with a historic bandstand to now surround the old Chapel and Mother Seton House. To the east in the 1980s was constructed a four-lane landscaped parkway with median strip of the Martin Luther King, Jr. Boulevard, edged by short brick retaining walls which curved around the west side of downtown Baltimore like an inner "beltway".

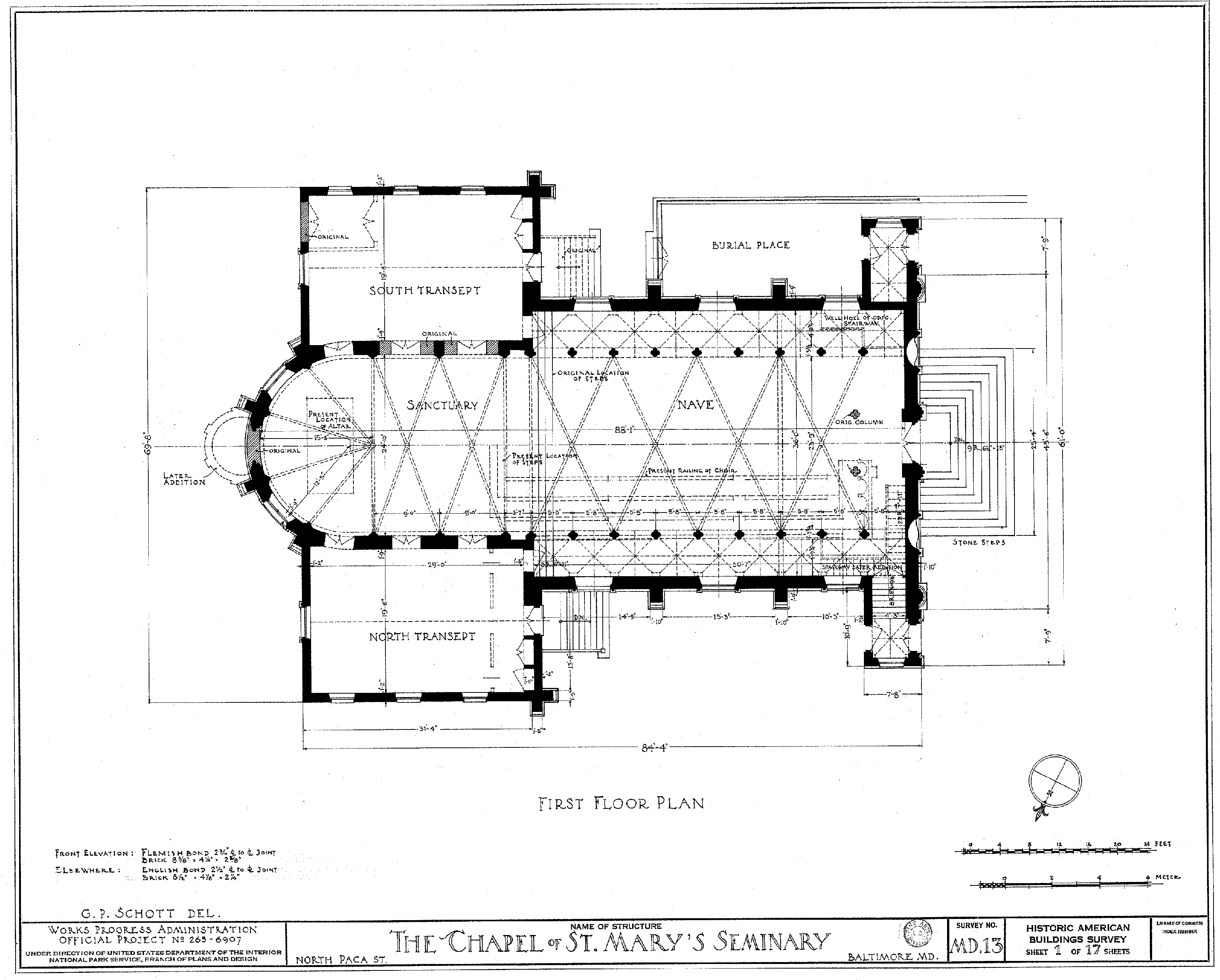
Plan, main level

=== Architecture ===
The small, brick chapel, measuring approximately 90 feet (27 m) long by 70 feet (21 m) wide, is one and a half stories high, set on a high basement. A false front braced by small flying buttresses rises above the main roof, the result of economy measures that lowered the roof below the level of the intended rose window. A tower, statuary and stained glass in the front windows were also cut. The round arched windows are set in rectangular openings. The bricks were originally made for architect Benjamin Henry Latrobe's Baltimore Cathedral/Basilica of the Assumption of Mary (constructed 1806-1821), but it was eventually built of stone blocks. This was the first Catholic cathedral constructed in America to serve the new Archdiocese of Baltimore. The bricks were then purchased for this project for $3,000.00, contributed by Charles Carroll of Carrollton, (1737-1832), last surviving signer of the Declaration of Independence and at one time the richest man in America. A stucco cornice lines the sides of the chapel. The interior comprises a wide nave flanked by narrow side aisles. Nine aisle column bays frame three sets of stained glass windows on each side. A sanctuary is set 18 inches (0.46 m) higher than the nave, flanked by transepts on either side and ending in a small semicircular apse. A balcony extends three bays inward from the entry over the nave. The nave's ceiling is plaster, simulating a shallow rib-vault. A crypt underlies the chapel.

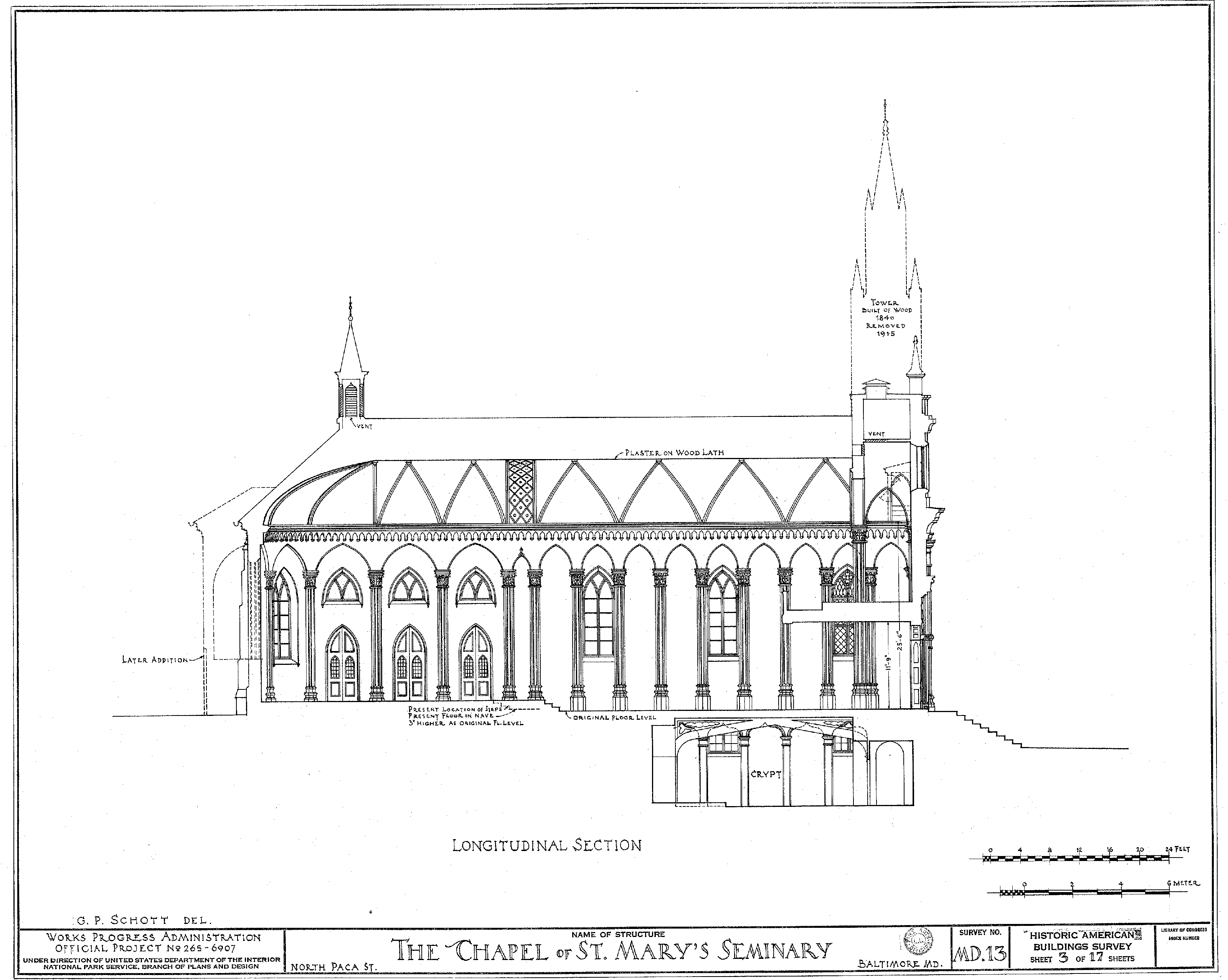
Longitudinal section showing missing tower

In 1839, the chapel gained a tower with a spire and interior decoration by noted local architect Robert Cary Long, jr. (1810-1849) However, Long's steeple later became unstable and was removed in 1916. Some of Godefroy's wood and plaster work was removed at this time. A 1967 renovation sought to restore the chapel to Godefroy's original architectural and artistic intentions.

The chapel's basement was used for services by Black Catholic refugees from Santo Domingo (modern Haiti), a former French colony on the western end of the island of Hispaniola in the Caribbean Sea and the West Indies, where the Black slaves rose up in rebellion during the early 1790s and established the first Black republic, but unleashed decades of turmoil. Lessons for African-American children were also provided there by the Oblate Sisters of Providence. Later these lessons and masses developed into the first black Catholic congregations at St. Francis Xavier Parish on East Oliver Street to commemorate St. Francis Xavier and St. Peter Claver Parish in West Baltimore which remembers St. Peter Claver. The Josephite Fathers religious order has a special ministry among the African American community within the Catholic Church.

The chapel was designated a National Historic Landmark on November 11, 1971.

== See also ==
- St. Thomas Catholic Church and Howard-Flaget House, a very similar Sulpician church in Kentucky, also designed by Godefroy
- List of National Historic Landmarks in Maryland
- National Register of Historic Places listings in Central Baltimore
