= United States Custom House (Baltimore) =

- U.S. Custom House
- U.S. National Register of Historic Places
- Baltimore City Landmark
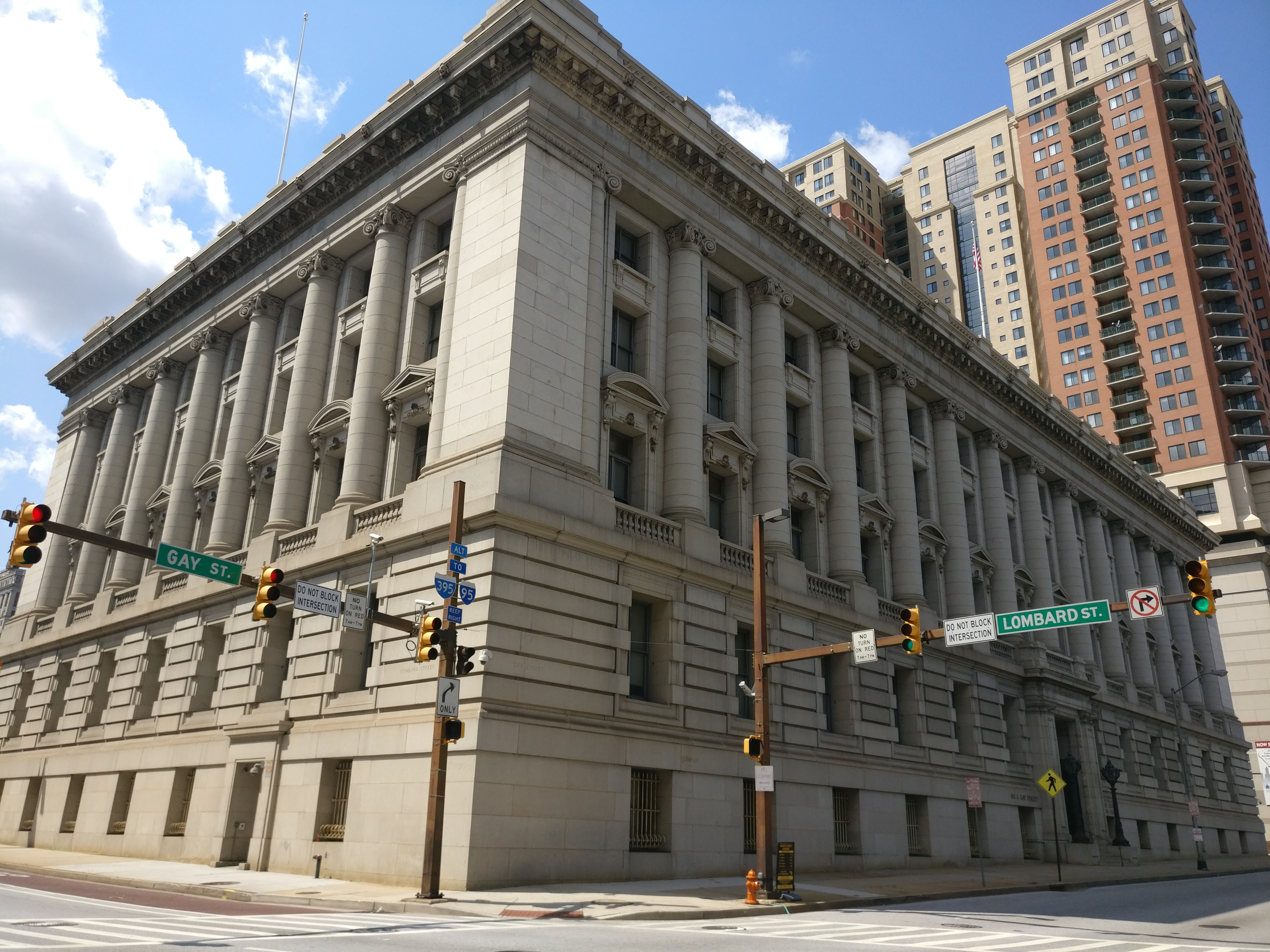
- Baltimore Custom House
- Interactive map of U.S. Custom House
- Location: 40 S. Gay St., Baltimore, Maryland
- Coordinates: 39°17′17.4″N 76°36′32.6″W
- Area: 1 acre (0.40 ha)
- Built: 1903–1907
- Architect: Hornblower & Marshall
- Architectural style: Beaux-arts
- NRHP reference No.: 74002217

Significant dates
- Added to NRHP: February 15, 1974
- Designated BCL: 1977

U.S. Custom House is a historic custom house building located at Baltimore, Maryland, United States. It is a granite, steel-frame structure measuring 252 feet 8 inches (77.01 m) by 139 feet 6 inches (42.52 m). It is an exceptionally distinguished example of Beaux Arts architecture and was built from 1903 through late 1907 from plans by Hornblower and Marshall, a Washington, D.C. firm. The ceiling of the Call Room, located in the pavilion, was painted by Francis Davis Millet (1846–1912). It served as Baltimore's Custom House until 1953. Since that time various Federal agencies have occupied the building.

U.S. Custom House was listed on the National Register of Historic Places in 1974.

== Building history ==
In the 18th and 19th centuries, Baltimore flourished as one of the nation's major commercial ports, its economy growing as foreign trade increased. In 1789, the First U.S. Congress established the United States Customs Service and named Baltimore as one of 59 collection districts. The first Baltimore custom house was at the intersection of South Gay between East Lombard and Water Streets, across from the present location. Around 1820 the government began to rent a wing of the Merchants' Exchange Building to house the Customs Service. Designed by J. Maximilian Godefroy, (1765-1838), and famous British-American architect Benjamin Henry Latrobe, (1764-1820), in an H-shaped structure and constructed in 1816–1820, the Merchant's Exchange Building was the largest domed building of its kind in America and a landmark of the city symbolizing its commercial importance. It continued to house the U.S. Customs Service, along with the U.S. Courthouse for District and Circuit Court of Appeals, Post Office and a branch of the Bank of the United States and separate wings for the first City Hall and another for offices of shipping companies, brokers, attorneys and related maritime businesses through the end of the 19th century. In April 1865, the rotunda was the site of a viewing ceremony during the long procession winding through the downtown city streets for assassinated 16th President Abraham Lincoln as later his decorated train traveled through the Northern States back to his home in Springfield, Illinois for burial.

In 1900 the Treasury Department held a design competition for Baltimore's third custom house. It was to be built on the site of the famed Merchant's Exchange. The winning entry was by the prominent Washington, D.C. firm of Hornblower and Marshall.

The building's cornerstone was laid on June 13, 1903, in a ceremony attended by several hundred people. On February 7–8, 1904 as construction neared the third floor, a catastrophic fire swept through downtown Baltimore. Over 1,500 buildings were destroyed, and the Custom House suffered major damage. Many of the granite blocks had been split by the heat. These had to be removed and replaced in what proved to be a difficult and costly process. The structure's northwest corner was almost entirely rebuilt. Despite this setback, construction continued, and the building was completed and occupied at the end of 1907.

From the time of its completion, the Custom House was widely praised as a triumph of both design and workmanship. In 1908, the American Architect and Building News declared, "The result achieved by the intelligent cooperation of architect and artist stamps Baltimore's new Custom House as among the most successful public buildings erected in this country." Today the Custom House remains an outstanding interpretation of the Beaux-Arts vision and a monument to the dignity of the federal government.

== Architecture ==
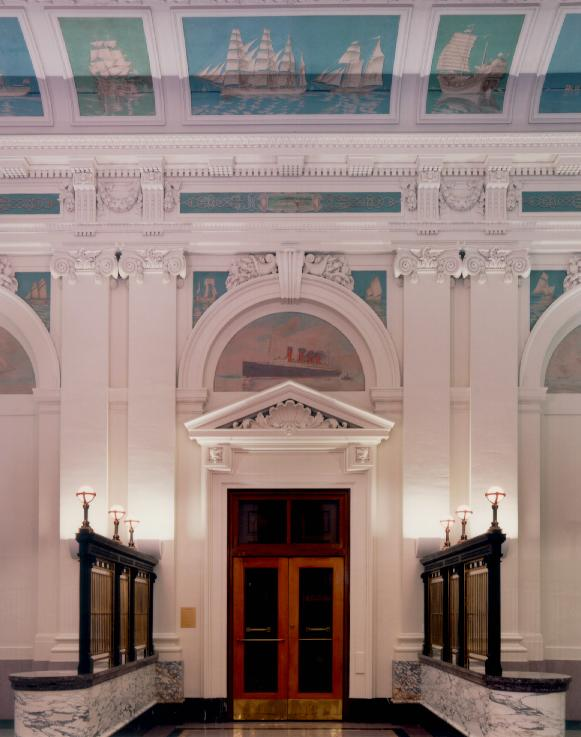
Call Room

The U.S. Custom House in Baltimore is located two blocks north of the Inner Harbor, on a gently sloping site bounded by Gay, Lombard, and Water Streets. The six-story building, 92 feet high from base to roof balustrade, displays an axial symmetry and imposing presence characteristic of the Beaux-Arts style. The building's architects, Joseph C. Hornblower (1848–1908) and John Rush Marshall (1851–1927), began their careers in the Office of the Supervising Architect of the Treasury Department. They used Hornblower's training at the École des Beaux-Arts and the experiences of their European tours to apply French academic planning and organizational principles to American civic architecture.

The steel structure and masonry bearing walls are faced with granite quarried near Laurel, Maryland, and Mount Airy, North Carolina. The primary facade fronts Gay Street. A smooth-faced basement level (extending from grade up to a watertable course) rises to a heavily rusticated first floor. The second through fourth stories are articulated by three-story engaged Ionic columns, flanking the recessed window bays. Alternating segmental and triangular pediments carried on consoles top the second-story windows. The smooth columns support a full entablature and roof balustrade, which wrap around the building and conceal the attic story and flat roof.

The Gay Street entrance is approached by marble steps that are flanked by plinths with wrought-iron lamp standards with lamps resembling 18th century ship's stern lanterns. The entrance doors are protected behind wrought-iron grillework.

The west (Commerce Street) side of the building reveals an "E-shaped" plan. The double-story Call Room pavilion forms the middle arm of the "E" and is on axis with the entrance. Rusticated corners flank a five-bay window arcade. The window spandrels are decorated with carvings depicting sea monsters, shells, and other nautical ornamentation that reflect the Custom House's proximity to Baltimore's Inner Harbor. A balustraded parapet shields the copper-clad roof of the pavilion.

The main lobby has a marble floor with an inlaid brass compass design. The walls are paneled with variegated marble. The lobby is flanked by elevators and stairhalls, with marble stairs and ornamental iron and brass railings. A narrow corridor connects the lobby to the historic Call Room where customs revenues were paid.

The Call Room is the Custom House's most impressive, and historically significant, space. The walls have paired Ionic pilasters supporting an entablature with a paneled frieze. The paneled cove rises to the central ceiling panel, measuring 63 feet by 30 feet, and adorned with a mural entitled Entering the Harbour. It depicts a fleet of ten sailing vessels: ships including a whaler, barks, a barquentine, a brig, and a schooner entering the harbor. The panels of the cove and frieze, five lunettes on the east wall, and the borders of the ceiling panel depict the evolution of navigation. They portray over 125 vessels, from ancient Egyptian ships to the R.M.S. Mauretania of 1907, accompanied by J. P. Morgan's yacht, the Corsair. All of the murals were painted by Francis Davis Millet, a prominent American muralist of the period. Millet died just a few years after these murals were completed, perishing along with over 1,500 others in the sinking of the R.M.S. Titanic in 1912.

After four years of renovation and modernization work, the Custom House formally reopened in 1997.

== Significant events ==
- 1789: The U.S. Customs Service is established, and Baltimore is named as one of 59 collection districts.
- 1816-1820: The Merchant's Exchange Building, designed by Maximilian Godefroy and Benjamin H. Latrobe, is constructed; one wing is used for Customs Service.
- 1900: Hornblower and Marshall are selected as architects for the new Custom House.
- 1903: The cornerstone of the present-day Custom House is laid on the former site of the Exchange Building.
- 1904: A devastating fire ravages a seventy-block area of Baltimore, damaging the unfinished Custom House.
- 1907: Construction is completed.
- 1972: The building is designated one of America's twelve Historic Custom Houses.
- 1974: The Custom House is listed in the National Register of Historic Places.
- 1982: The Custom House Exhibits Sunken Treasures salvaged by World Famous Treasure Hunter Mel Fisher, that he salvaged off the Florida Keys from the 1622 Shipwrecks of the Nuestra Senora de Atocha and her sistership the Santa Margarita.
- 1997: The Custom House is formally reopened after a four-year renovation project.
