= Mother Seton House =

Historic house in Maryland, United States

- U.S. National Register of Historic Places
- Baltimore City Landmark
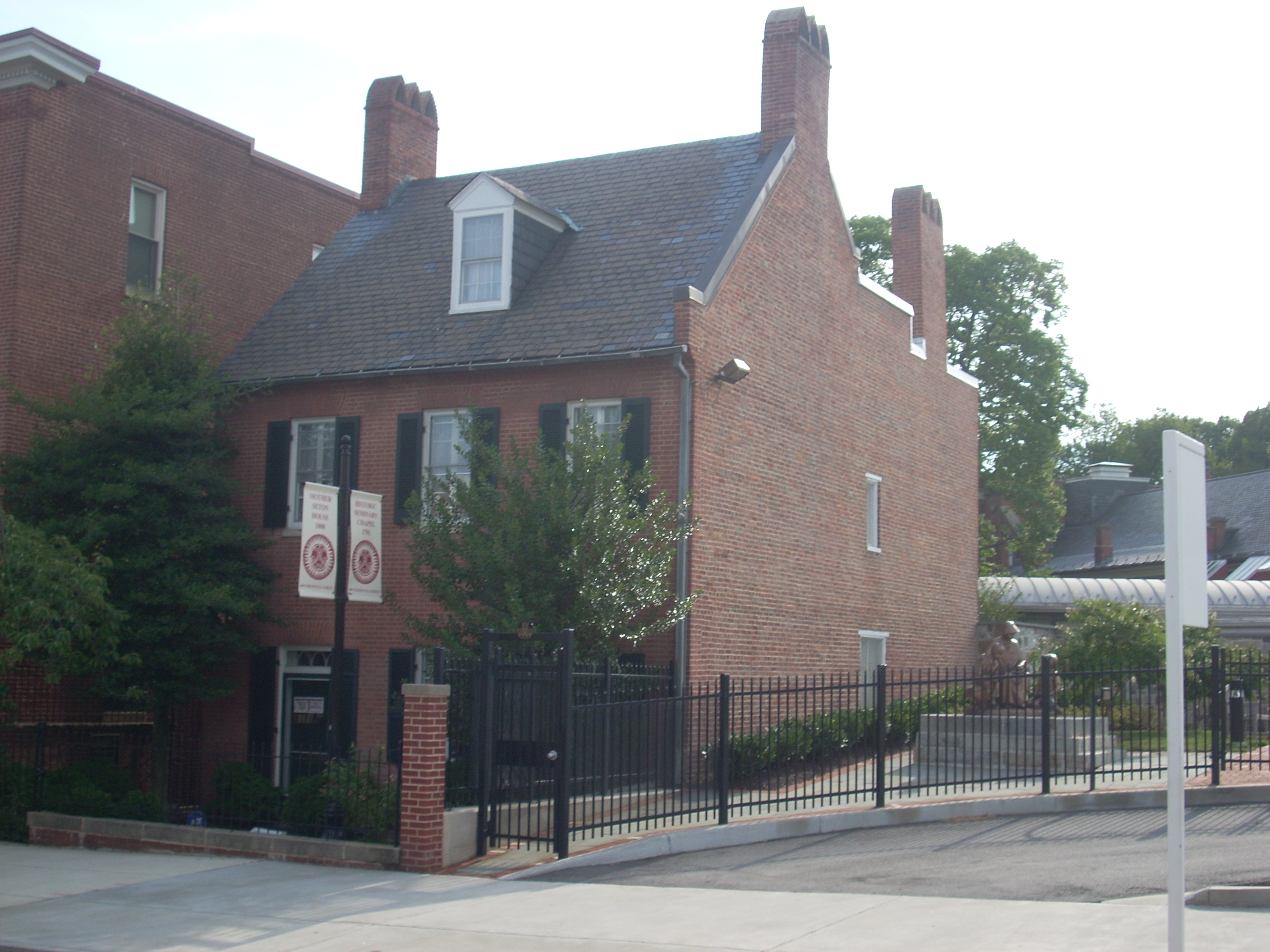
- Mother Seton House in 2011
- Interactive map of Mother Seton House
- Location: 600 North Paca Street, Baltimore, Maryland
- Coordinates: 39°17′45″N 76°37′22.3″W
- Area: 1 acre (0.40 ha)
- Built: 1808
- NRHP reference No.: 72001496

Significant dates
- Added to NRHP: June 13, 1972
- Designated BCL: 1975

Mother Seton House is a historic home located on the grounds of St. Mary’s Seminary at Baltimore, Maryland, United States. It is a 2 1/2-story red brick house, similar to other small homes built in the early 19th century for the predominantly French community nearby. It was built in 1808 as the home of Elizabeth Ann Seton (1774–1821), the first American-born woman beatified and canonized by the Catholic Church. In the 1960s it was restored to its original appearance through the efforts of a committee, which continues to operate the home as a museum. Mother Seton House is located adjacent to the St. Mary's Seminary Chapel.

In 1972, Mother Seton House was listed on the National Register of Historic Places.

== Mother Seton’s connection ==
This home on North Paca Street is most well known for its first owner, Mother Seton. She would arrive to the home in Baltimore on June 16, 1808, and stay until June 21, 1809. During her brief year in Baltimore, Seton would pay rent totaling at $250.00. Upon her arrival to the home, Elizabeth Seton was more than pleased with the house. In fact, she penned a letter to a friend, Julia Scott, describing it as a "‘neat, delightful mansion, entirely new...in the new French style of folding windows and recesses.’" Despite the fact that Elizabeth Seton only inhabited the home for a year, a long-lasting bond between the two was formed.

== House description ==
Prior to the home’s existence, the land was occupied by French immigrants. They used the land mainly for tobacco and wheat farming. The house was constructed during the Federal Period roughly around 1807. Although the architect of the original home is unknown, it is believed that Maximilian Godefroy was the mastermind behind the project. He was responsible for much of the designs in the surrounding buildings. Inspiration for the home was drawn from the French immigrants in what is to be known as "Federal Architecture." As it stands, the row-home is located within St. Mary’s Park, just minutes from Downtown Baltimore. The most notable feature about the home is the 26’ wide and 42’ deep staircase that can be seen from the entrance. The house contains at least three bedrooms on the second floor, but there is no total room count for the entire property.

== Reason it was built ==
Elizabeth Seton told Bishop Carroll she wanted to reunite with her children. He agreed to send her sons down to Baltimore, suggesting that they enroll in school at St. Mary’s College. He himself was the president of the college; therefore he could see that her sons were admitted. The only condition that Seton had to follow was to "establish a school for young girls." This was to be a boarding school which welcomed girls of all ages. The school was funded and developed through the Daughters of Charity.

== After Seton ==
After Seton’s departure to Emmitsburg, Maryland in the summer of 1809 the house was left vacant for some time. In the late 19th century and early 20th century the home was used as a potato bin. and a place of storage and laundry services. After it received negative attention for its lack of upkeep, a local women’s group initiated the restoration of the home. The property is owned by the Sulpician Order, which also controls of St. Mary’s Seminary. In the process of renovation, the house was thoroughly documented by taking photos of both the interior and exterior in order to restore the home to its original condition. It was furnished with Federal decor.
