= Battle Monument =

Monument in Baltimore, Maryland, U.S.

- U.S. National Register of Historic Places
- Baltimore City Landmark
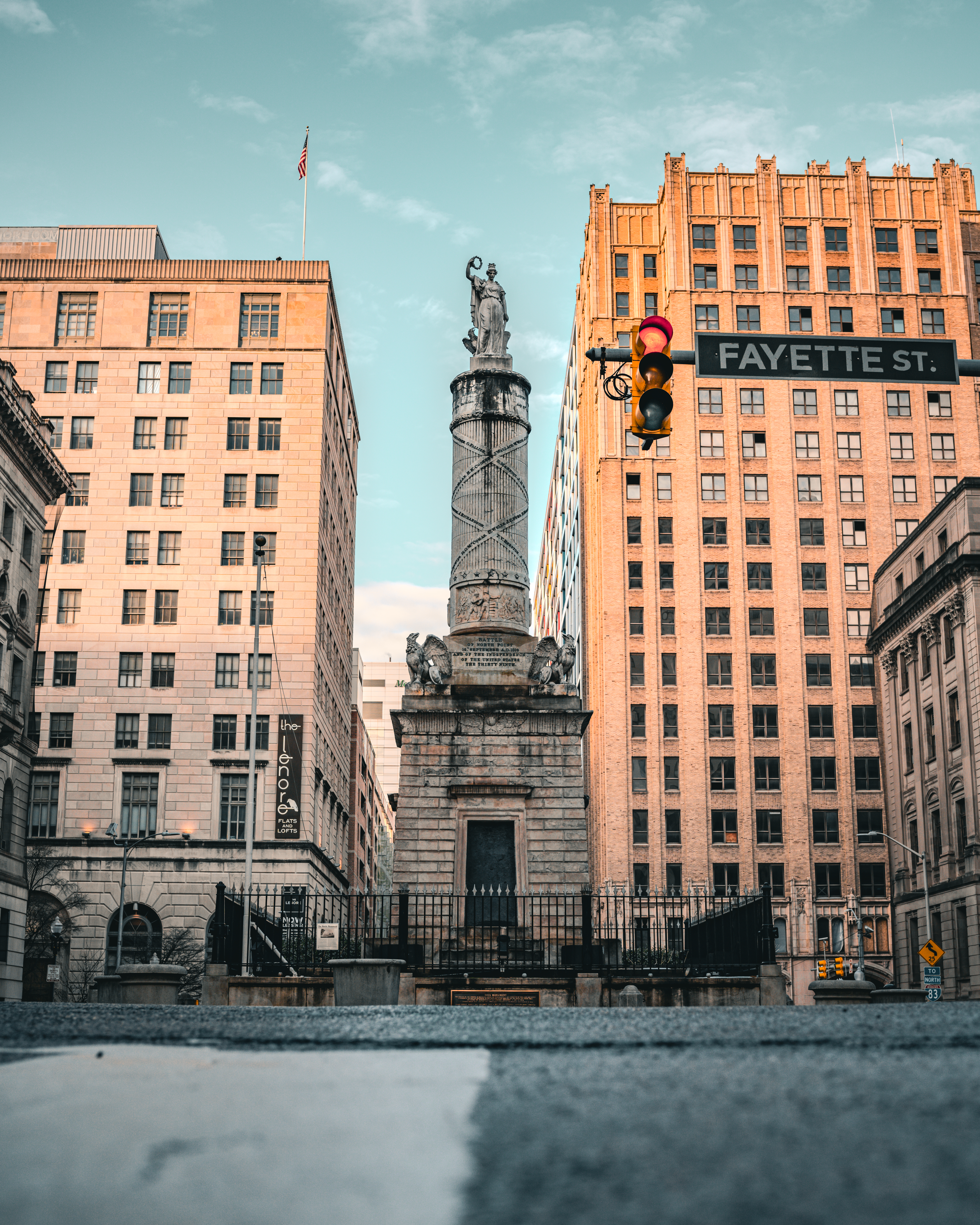
- Battle Monument, Baltimore, January 2025

- Location within Baltimore Location within Maryland Location within the United States
- Location: Calvert St. between Fayette and Lexington Sts., Baltimore, Maryland
- Coordinates: 39°17′26.5″N 76°36′44.7″W
- Area: 1 acre (0.40 ha)
- Built: 1815
- Architect: Godefroy, J. Maximillian M.; Capellano, Antonio (crowning statue sculpture)
- NRHP reference No.: 73002181

Significant dates
- Added to NRHP: June 4, 1973
- Designated BCL: 1975

The Battle Monument, located in Battle Monument Square on North Calvert Street between East Fayette and East Lexington Streets in Baltimore, Maryland, commemorates the Battle of Baltimore, with the British fleet of the Royal Navy's bombardment of Fort McHenry, the Battle of North Point, southeast of the city in Baltimore County on the Patapsco Neck peninsula, and the stand-off on the eastern siege fortifications along Loudenschlager and Potter's Hills, later called Hampstead Hill, in what is now Patterson Park since 1827, east of town.

It honors those who died in September 1814, during the War of 1812. The monument lies in the middle of the street and is between the two Baltimore City Circuit Courthouses that are located on the opposite sides of North Calvert Street. It was sponsored by the City and the "Committee of Vigilance and Safety" led by Mayor Edward Johnson and military commanders: Brig. Gen. John Stricker, Maj. Gen. Samuel Smith and Lt. Col. George Armistead (of Fort McHenry).

== Construction ==
The site of the former first Baltimore County and Town/City Courthouse, torn down in 1809, was originally designated as the location for the newly planned Washington Monument. Designed by Robert Mills (1781–1855), the cornerstone of the Washington Monument for Baltimore had just been laid on Independence Day, July 4, 1815. Fears that the designed shaft of the column would be too tall for the smaller open space of the old Courthouse Square, and might fall over onto nearby close-in townhouses, caused a last-minute change in location. The monument site for the nation's first president was moved further north of the city into "Howard's Woods" of the "Belvindere" estate of Col. John Eager Howard (1752–1827).

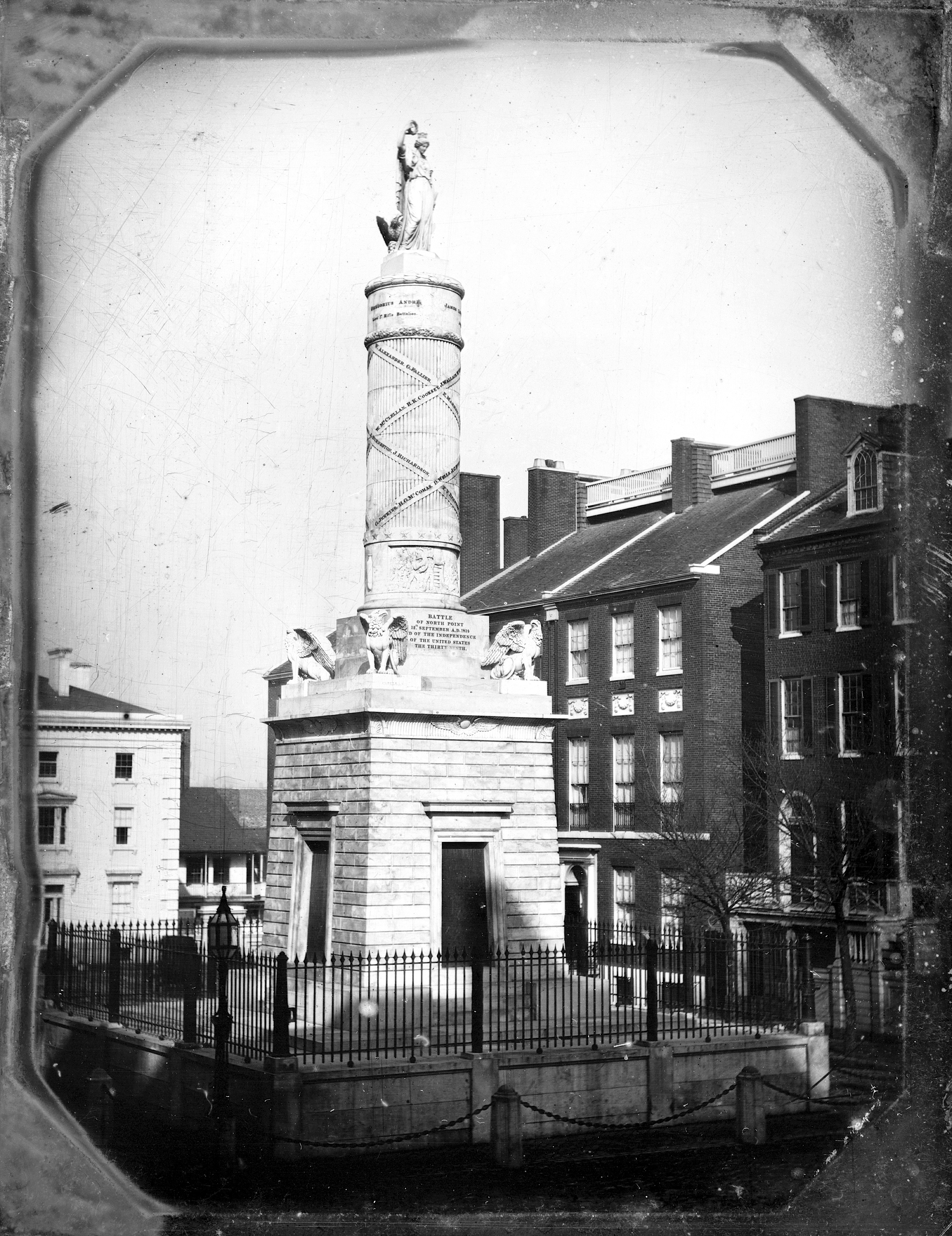
The Battle Monument in 1846.

The monument was built in 1815–25, and is 39 feet (11.9 m) tall. It was designed by Baltimore architect J. Maximilian M. Godefroy, sculptor to the Court of Spain. The base of the monument is an Egyptian Revival cenotaph. It is an unusually democratic monument for the time in that it records the names of all who died, regardless of rank. The eighteen layers of the marble base represent the eighteen states that made up the United States at the time of the war. A griffin is at each corner of the base. The column, carved as a Roman fasces, is bound with cords listing the names of soldiers who died during the battle, while the names of officers who died are at the top.

== Female statue ==
The monument is topped by an 8 feet tall 2,750 pound Carrara marble statue by Antonio Capellano, of a female figure representing the City of Baltimore wearing a crown of victory, holding a laurel wreath in one hand and a ship's rudder in the other. It was hoisted to the top of the column during the middle of the period of construction on the eighth anniversary ceremonies, Defenders Day, September 12, 1822.

Colloquially called Lady Baltimore, the statue was relocated to the Maryland Historical Society on October 5, 2013, in order to preserve it from further damage caused by time and nature. It was replaced by a concrete replica. The monument is the oldest stone monument and first public war memorial in the United States.

== Seal of Baltimore ==
The monument is depicted on the seal of the City of Baltimore that was adopted in 1827 and the city's flag adopted in the early 20th century.

Seal of the City of Baltimore with the Column.

Baltimore City's flag with the column.

== Depictions in film ==
The monument is erroneously depicted as being in Washington, D.C. in the 2007 film Live Free or Die Hard starring Bruce Willis, which had numerous scenes actually filmed in downtown Baltimore.

== Inclusion in heritage registries ==
The Battle Monument was placed on the National Register of Historic Places on June 4, 1973. It is contained within the Business and Government Historic District and is within the Baltimore National Heritage Area.

== See also ==
- Egyptian revival
- List of public art in Baltimore
- Washington Monument (Baltimore)
- Flag of Baltimore
