= Maximilian Godefroy =

French-American architect

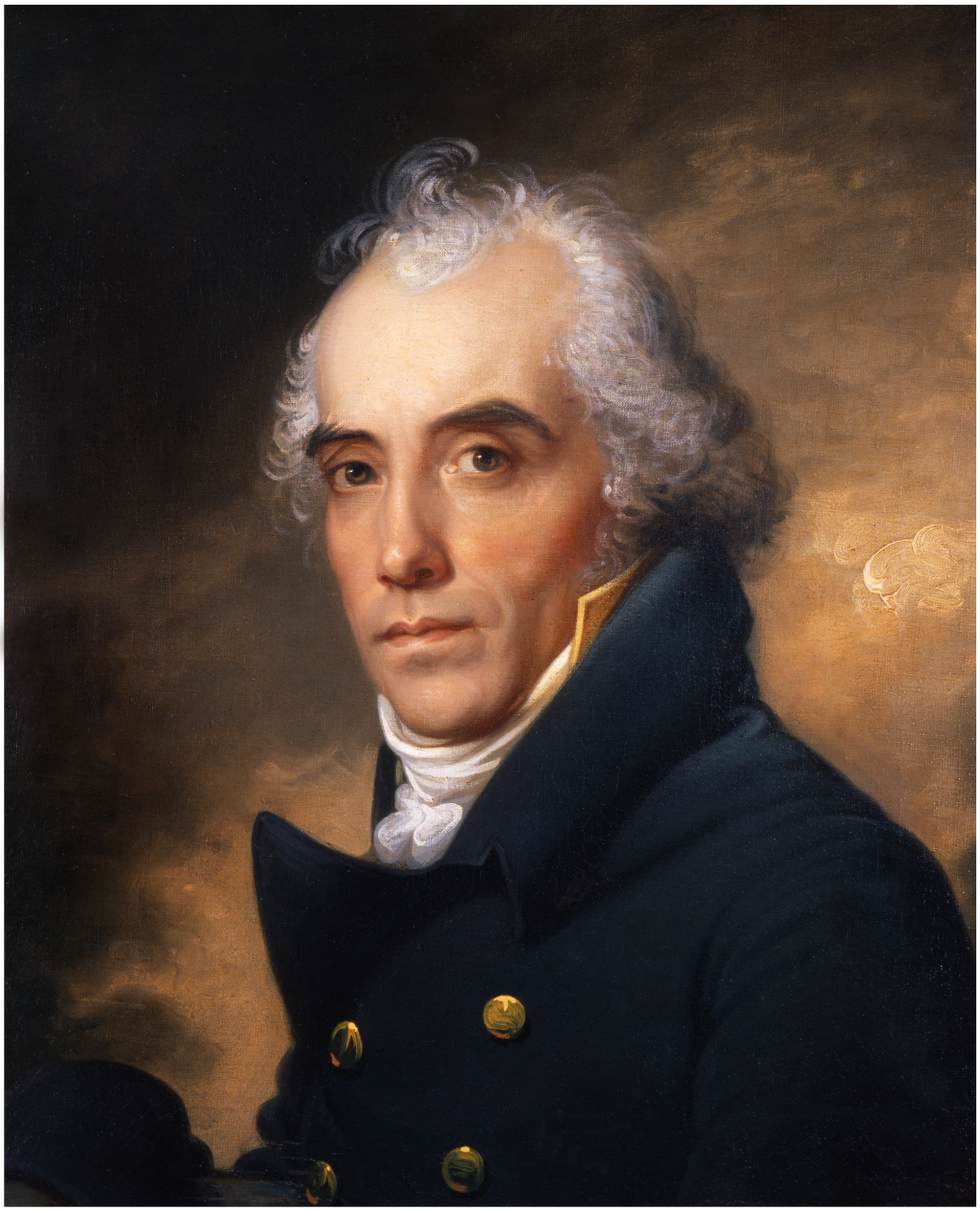
- Born: 1765; Paris, France
- Died: 7 April 1848 (aged 82–83)
- Occupation: Architect

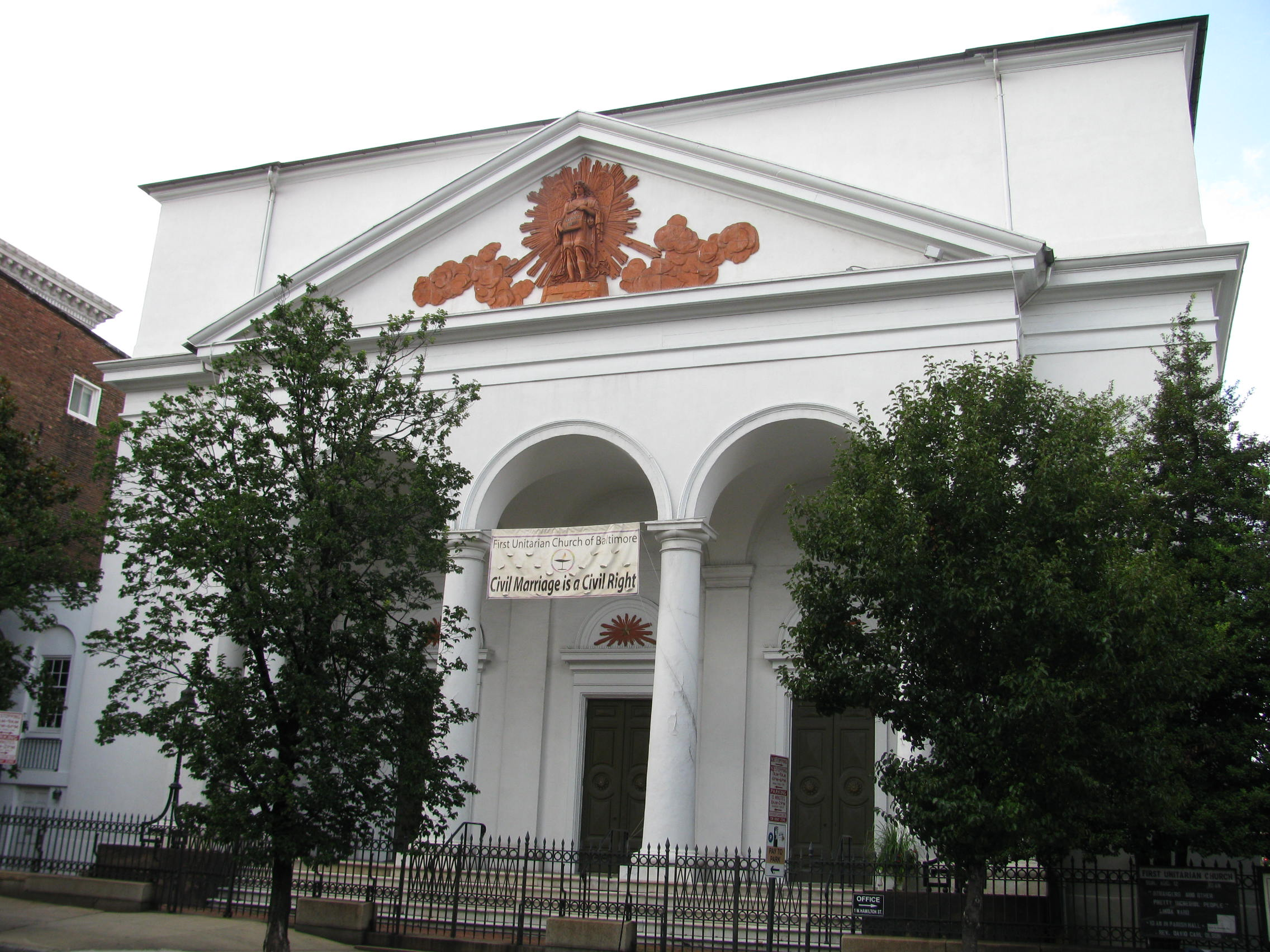
First Unitarian Church (Baltimore, Maryland), 1818

J. Maximilian M. Godefroy (1765 – 7 April 1848) was a French-American architect. Godefroy was born in France and educated as a geographical/civil engineer. During the French Revolution he fought briefly on the Royalist side. Later, as an anti-Bonaparte activist, he was imprisoned in the fortress of Bellegarde and Château d'If then released about 1805 and allowed to come to the United States, settling in Baltimore, Maryland, where he became an instructor in drawing, art and military science at St. Mary's College, the Sulpician Seminary. By 1808, Godefroy had married Eliza Crawford Anderson, editor of her own periodical, the Observer and the niece of a wealthy Baltimore merchant.

While in Baltimore, he designed a number of important and famous structures including the St. Mary's Seminary Chapel of St. Mary's Seminary and College along St. Mary's and Orchard Streets in the Seton Hill neighborhood in the northwest city, the Battle Monument, in the old Courthouse Square of the central city (for the defenders and casualties of the British bombardment of Fort McHenry and the Battle of North Point in September 1814, at North Calvert Street, between East Lexington and Fayette Streets, and the First Independent Church of Baltimore (later known as "Unitarian and Universalist" by 1935, at North Charles and West Franklin Streets - in the Mount Vernon-Belvedere neighborhood). Other projects included the Commercial and Farmers Bank (now demolished), as well as the iron gates and monuments in the burial grounds beneath the Westminster Presbyterian Church (at North Greene and West Fayette Streets), the "sally port" (gatehouse) at Fort McHenry, as well as submitting plans for the 1815 design competition for the Washington Monument to be built in Baltimore. Godefroy became acquainted with well-known British-American architect Benjamin Henry Latrobe, (1764-1820), and married Eliza Crawford Anderson, whose father, Dr. John Crawford, was one of the founders of the College of Medicine of Maryland. However, while working with Latrobe on the "Baltimore Merchant's Exchange" (demolished to make way for the new U.S. Custom House in 1902), Godefroy and Latrobe fell out and dissolved the partnership. Latrobe was to have contributed the overall design, while Godefroy was to execute the drawings and supervise construction. Godefroy changed the plans to reflect his own ideas. After parting company, Latrobe continued to credit Godefroy with the design for the front of the Exchange, and did not compete with him for the plans to design the new First Independent Church (Unitarians). Godefroy, however, blamed Latrobe for his inability to obtain further work in Baltimore.

Godefroy left Baltimore in 1819 for England, his daughter dying of yellow fever before the ship had cleared Chesapeake Bay. He worked for a while in London, then moved on to France. Prior to his death in 1848, he designed a new wing to the Palais de Justice and the Préfecture, both at Laval, Mayenne, France.

Godefroy designed the famous iconic "Battle Monument" from the recent War of 1812, commemorating the casualties of soldiers and officers from the previous British military attack in the Battle of Baltimore, with the bombardment of Fort McHenry, Battle of North Point, and stand-off at the eastern city fortifications at Loudenschlager's Hill, now Hampstead Hill in Patterson Park, September 12-13-14, 1814, at the old former Baltimore County/Town Courthouse Square on North Calvert Street between East Lexington and East Fayette Streets - constructed 1815 to 1822, and the now landmark First Independent Church of Baltimore, later to become known as the First Unitarian Church of Baltimore (Unitarian and Universalist) at West Franklin and North Charles Streets - 1817.

== Selected works ==
- St. Mary's Seminary Chapel, Baltimore, Maryland (1806–08)
- St. Thomas Church, Bardstown, Kentucky (1813–16)
- Battle Monument, Baltimore, Maryland (1815–25)
- Merchants' Exchange Building (Baltimore, Maryland) (1816-1820, demolished 1904)
- First Unitarian Church, Baltimore, Maryland (1818)
