= Otto Eugene Adams =

American architect (1889–1968)

- Born: November 1, 1889; Baltimore, Maryland, USA
- Died: January 31, 1968 (aged 78)
- Education: University of Pennsylvania
- Occupation: Architect
- Spouse: Marie Hagerty
- Children: Otto Eugene Adams Jr.; Henry J. Adams
- Parents: Henry Adams; Elizabeth Klingelhofer
- Buildings: Baker Memorial Chapel

Otto Eugene Adams Sr. (November 1, 1889 – January 31, 1968) was an American architect born in Baltimore, Maryland, on November 1, 1889, to a family with Baltimore and German ancestry.

== Family ==
Adams's father, Henry Adams, was an emigrant from Duisburg, Prussia, and a successful engineer who enjoyed considerable professional prominence due to his work with the District of Columbia government buildings, and his pioneering and organization of the ASHVE. At the time of Otto's birth, Mr. Adams was achieving prominence as building system designer due to his work on the Corcoran and Flagg buildings in Washington, D.C. Despite his father's involvement in D.C. building, the Adams family remained in Baltimore throughout Otto's childhood. His mother was Mary Elizabeth Klingelhofer, whose parents, John E. and Mary Klingelhofer, were Baltimore bakers who had emigrated from Hessen, Germany. Adams was the middle child of the children who are known: his brother Ernest Henry Adams was the oldest, Clarence Timothy Adams the younger brother. Both of his brothers followed their father directly into the family business as engineers and became officers when the company was incorporated, upon their father's death.

Adams married Mrs. Marie Hagerty Adams, with whom he had two sons: Otto Eugene Adams Jr. and Henry J. Adams (the geologist and financier).

== Education ==
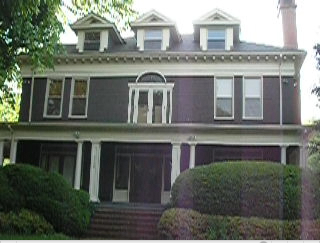
428 Roland Ave. Built 1926

At age 17, Adams left Baltimore to attend college at University of Pennsylvania where he studied Architecture, completing both a B.S. (1911) and M.S. (1912) degrees. During his time at Penn, one of his colleagues, James Richard Edmunds Jr., was also to become a notable Baltimore architect. Adams's talent was recognized early, when his participation in the New York Intercollegiate Architectural Federation competition gained him a mention while still an undergraduate. Otto Eugene Adams served during World War I as a captain in the US Army in France where he was injured in the arm. Thereafter, he expanded his expertise and theoretical understanding of his field through advanced certification at both the prestigious Ecole des Beaux Arts, Paris and at the American Academy, Rome. O. E. Adams was listed in the Maryland Manual editions 1916 through 1920 as a Notary Public and his address was given as 900 N. Gay St.

== Practice ==
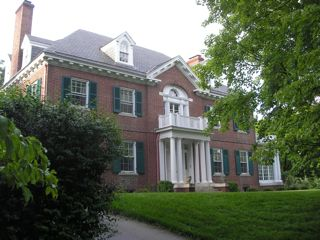
16 Overhill Rd. Built 1928

Much of the work attributed to Adams was creation of public architecture or bent toward theoretical study of buildings: programming, rejuvenation and improving the efficiency of pre-existing facilities. In his report to the mayor's office, regarding the state of the Baltimore City Courthouse, he said: "it has been doing the work for which it was designed. Fortunately, due to having a fundamentally sound building to work on, it is possible to so modernize the Courthouse for another generation." The approach to his work and quotations that he gave about his work, demonstrate an interest in sustainable design, embodied energy in building assemblies, and overall efficiency, much the way current designers are interested in green architecture.

Adams had a long career, considering his formal retirement in 1959, of over 40 years. Throughout that time he collaborated on much of his work with his father's engineering consulting firm. Adams was a partner in the firm of Adams & Rigg for much of that time. Though the arrangement may have only been formalized later, since as late as 1946, he is given recognition as if a sole-proprietor. Adams was a member of the American Institute of Architects and was faculty for the Maryland Institute, College of Art architectural program.

== Works ==
=== Public works ===
An incomplete list of works and studies attributed to Otto Eugene Adams, in Baltimore and other Maryland cities:

Kelso Home for Girls

- Baltimore City Courthouse study
- Dormitory Building, Baltimore Orphanage (address not given)
- Emanuel Evangelical Church, Baltimore & Garrison Ave., Baltimore
- Methodist Home for the Aged which is currently Springwell Senior Living Community
- Home purchased for Baltimore Orphanage Asylum at Govans "Marble Hall" Woodbourne Ave. home of Charles S. Abell originally summer home of Enoch Pratt. Asylum to move from Stricker St.,
- Nursery and Childs Hospital - Woodbourne Rd. and East side York Rd.
- Competition for the Baltimore City College building
- Kelso Home for Orphans (became Kelso Home for Girls) - building and planning, 17-acre (69,000 m^{2}) tract, Towson (charity now resides at Garrison Ave. and Forest Park Ave. ), (now Towson YMCA).
- Enoch Pratt Free Library Branch no. 27 Westport, 1929.
- Fairfield Elementary School (Chesapeake Ave and Sun Street), 1942
- Govans School no. 213, York Rd. 1951
- Baker Memorial Chapel abt.1958 and possibly other buildings at Western Maryland College (now McDaniel College). The campus plan and several buildings look as if they might have been fashioned by him.
- Woodbourne Junior High (now Chinquapin School # 46 at Woodbourne and Beauregard avenues) completed 1959
- Baltimore (Broadway) Public Comfort Station 1922
- Baltimore Police (Belair Road) Sub-station 1922

=== Residential designs and alterations ===
An incomplete list:

==== Guilford (neighborhood) ====
- 211 Chancery Rd. of Roland Pk. 1928
- 214 Chancery Rd. of Roland Pk. 1925
- 219 Southway 1920

==== Roland Park (neighborhood) Civic League ====
- 107 Club Rd. 1926, 1928
- 509 Edgevale Rd. 1925, 1948
- 3 Englewood Rd. 1929
- 5403 Falls Rd. 1936
- 903 Falls Rd. 1933
- 312 Overhill Rd. 1929
- 16 Overhill Rd. 1928
- 4906 Roland Ave. 1932
- 428 Roland Ave. 1926

==== Homeland (neighborhood) ====
- 202 Churchwarden's Rd. 1929
