= Thomas Kelso =

American philanthropist (1784–1878)

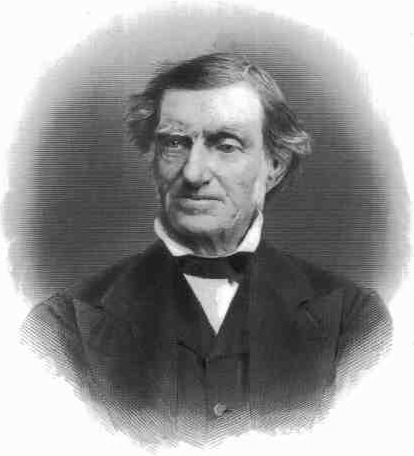
- Born: 1784; Clones, County Monaghan, Ireland
- Died: July 26, 1878 (aged 93–94); Baltimore, Maryland, U.S.
- Occupations: Philanthropist; businessman
- Spouse: Ellen Cross (m. 1807)

Thomas Kelso (1784 – July 26, 1878) was an Irish-American philanthropist and businessman, who was born in Clones, a market town in the north of Ireland, August 28, 1784. He died on the morning of July 26, 1878 at his home of many years on East Baltimore Street in Baltimore, Maryland, at the age of 94.

== Life ==
Kelso's parents died when he was a child. He had two older brothers and a sister. Kelso came to the United States at age seven in 1791, arriving August 2 with his older brother John. The Kelso boys' oldest brother George was already in the U.S. working as a school teacher, and was known to be in the Baltimore vicinity. By chance, the three brothers were reunited while [John and Thomas?] were visiting the school George taught in. With $100 from George, the three began a successful butchering business. In 1807 he married Miss Ellen Cross, daughter of John and Jane Cross, well known and highly respected citizens of Cecil County in northeast Maryland.

His daughter, Mrs. Jane Kelso Guiteau, later the widow of the Rev. S. Guiteau, never recovered from her father's death and died suddenly in December 1878, at the landmark Carrollton Hotel, at the northeast corner of Light and German (now Redwood) Streets.

== Public life ==
One of the most prominent and influential citizens of his adopted home city in the 19th Century. During his career, he was a director in the Philadelphia, Wilmington and Baltimore Railroad for 37 years, which built its southern terminus in 1849–1850, east of the harbor "basin" (today's modern "Inner Harbor") at President and Fleet Streets of the President Street Station, (which is today the Baltimore Civil War Museum, with its landmark architectural design, the oldest big city train depot left in America and a historic site in the American Civil War for the infamous "Pratt Street Riots" with the "First Bloodshed of the Civil War" of April 19, 1861). Kelso was also the president of the Baltimore Equitable Fire Insurance Company, one of the oldest such fire insurers in the nation. vice president and director in the First National Bank of Baltimore, principal Director and principal stockholder in the Baltimore Steam Packet Company (locally famous as "The Old Bay Line") and the Seaboard and Roanoke Railroad Company, president of the Preachers' Aid Society of the Methodist Episcopal Church, and member and later President of the Board of Trustees of the Male Free School of Baltimore, organized 1802 under the direction of the trustees of the Methodist Episcopal Churches of Baltimore in the school room at the old Light Street Methodist Episcopal Church (between Baltimore and German (later Redwood) Streets, second site of the former historic Lovely Lane Meeting House or Chapel, (off German (now Redwood) Street, east of South Calvert Street), then known as the First Methodist Episcopal Church when constructing its 1884 "Centennial Monument of American Methodism" building at St. Paul and 23rd Streets in the Peabody Heights, now Charles Village neighborhood.

From June 2, 1861 through March 29, 1862, Kelso served on the military-appointed Baltimore City Board of Police Commissioners, which oversaw the Baltimore Police Department.

Later the Male Free School was incorporated in 1808, by January 1813, the school was moved to 39-1/2 Courtland Street by East Saratoga Street (today's St. Paul Street and Place, near "Preston Gardens"). Kelso succeeded the earlier presidents of the Board of Trustees, beginning with George Roberts 1808–1828, and William Wilkins, 1828–1833 at the death of Mr. Wilkins. Kelso remained in the presiding office until his death almost forty-five years later, he was succeeded by John B. Seidenstricker, a member of the Baltimore City Council and author of the resolution which established The High School of Baltimore in 1839, later the Male High School, then the Central High School of Baltimore – today's Baltimore City College, the third oldest public high school in America. The object of the Male Free School was to educate poor children without regard to creed and was increased by a bequest from Miss Rachel Colvin of $10,000 to enable the trustees of the Male Free School of Baltimore to expand its pupils to include girls, and so established the Colvin Institute for Girls.

Kelso was a contemporary and associate of another well known Baltimore merchant, financier and philanthropist, Enoch Pratt, (1808–1896), who founded and endowed the first public library circulating system in America, and the city's new public library, the Enoch Pratt Free Library in 1882–1886. They served together on the board of the Philadelphia, Wilmington and Baltimore Railroad Company.

Politically, he was a member of the Baltimore City Council for several terms, when there was no salary attached to the position. His philanthropic efforts were his several gifts to the various charities of the national and local Baltimore Annual Conference of the Methodist Episcopal Church; including $14,000 to the Metropolitan Methodist Episcopal Church in Washington, D.C. and $12,000 to the M.E. denomination's Church Extension Society.

He also established the Kelso Home (also known as the Kelso Orphans Asylum) with besides its property site at No. 87 East Baltimore Street, an original bequest of $120,000, included an annuity of $5,000 per year. It opened on January 1, 1874 (for orphans in 1872). The first location for the home was almost directly across the street from his residence in the Jonestown or Old Town neighborhood, east of the Jones Falls.
