= Samuel Ford McGill =

Liberian physician and politician (1815–1871)

Governor of Maryland in Liberia
- In office 1851 – June 8, 1854
- Preceded by: John Brown Russwurm
- Succeeded by: William A. Prout

Personal details
- Born: January 1815 Baltimore, Maryland
- Died: June 26, 1871 (aged 56)
- Education: Washington Medical College; Dartmouth College; Dartmouth Medical School

Samuel Ford McGill (January 1815 – June 26, 1871) was a Liberian medical doctor and politician who served as governor of Maryland in Liberia from 1851 to 1854. Born free in Baltimore, Maryland, he emigrated to Liberia in 1826.

== Early life and education ==
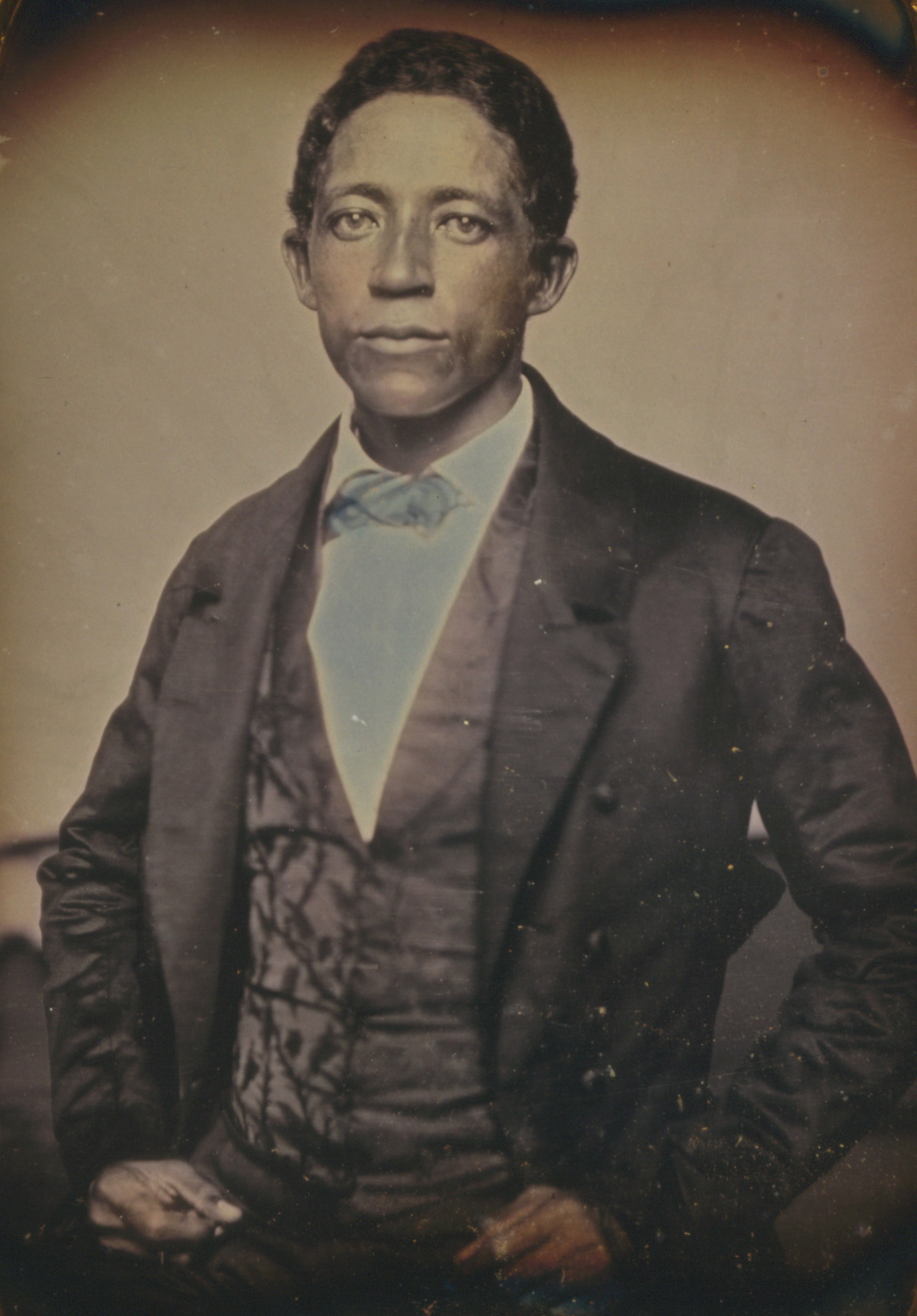
Samuel Ford McGill's brother, Urias McGill

Samuel Ford McGill was born in January 1815 in Baltimore, Maryland, to parents George R. and Angelina R. McGill. His father was born into slavery but was later freed. Samuel was the couple's eldest son. In 1826, Samuel emigrated to Liberia along with his parents. There, they lived in Monrovia. George had built up connections with the leaders of the colonization movement, and served as the vice agent of Liberia for one year, among other privileged positions in the colony. In 1827, the state of Maryland founded their own colonization society separate from that of the American Colonization Society. George's son-in-law, John Brown Russwurm, became the first governor of the colony established by this separate colonization society.

In the fall of 1835, George contacted Moses Sheppard, a former member of the Board of Governors of the Maryland State Colonization Society, to ask for assistance in raising funds for Samuel to attend medical school in the United States for him to practice medicine in Liberia. Sheppard gathered a network to try and help Samuel, and together they got him a position at Washington Medical College in Baltimore. Sheppard attempted to warn Samuel about the racism in America, as he had grown up ignorant to it in Liberia. In November 1836, Samuel began to attend lectures at Washington Medical College, but by the next month, white students had organized and protested for his expulsion. He was expelled before the end of 1836.

Sheppard then contacted a medical professor at the University of Vermont, Edward Elisha Phelps. They arranged for Samuel to be given an apprenticeship under Phelps, and he traveled to Windsor, Vermont in the winter of 1837. In July 1837, Phelps resigned from the University of Vermont to start a private medical practice. Phelps felt that Samuel was prepared to practice medicine, but Samuel wanted the legitimacy of a medical degree. Phelps then contacted a medical professor at Dartmouth College, Reuben D. Mussey, and secured him a position at the university. In June 1839, Samuel earned a medical degree from Dartmouth with honors. McGill was the first African-American to earn a medical degree.

== Career ==
Upon McGill's return to Liberia, he was the first black physician in the country. He mentored colonists in medicine for the next decade. In 1851, McGill was appointed as acting Governor of Maryland in Liberia upon the death of his brother-in-law, Governor Russwurm. McGill later became the proper governor of the colony. He served in this capacity until Maryland's independence on June 8, 1854. Later, in 1854, Samuel McGill joined his brothers Urias, James, and R. S. McGill into a trading firm called McGill Brothers. The firm was one of Liberia's most prominent commercial endeavors in its early years.

== Personal life ==
McGill was married twice. He had seven children with his first wife, and three children with his second.

== Death ==
McGill died on June 26, 1871.
