= Sheppard and Enoch Pratt Hospital =

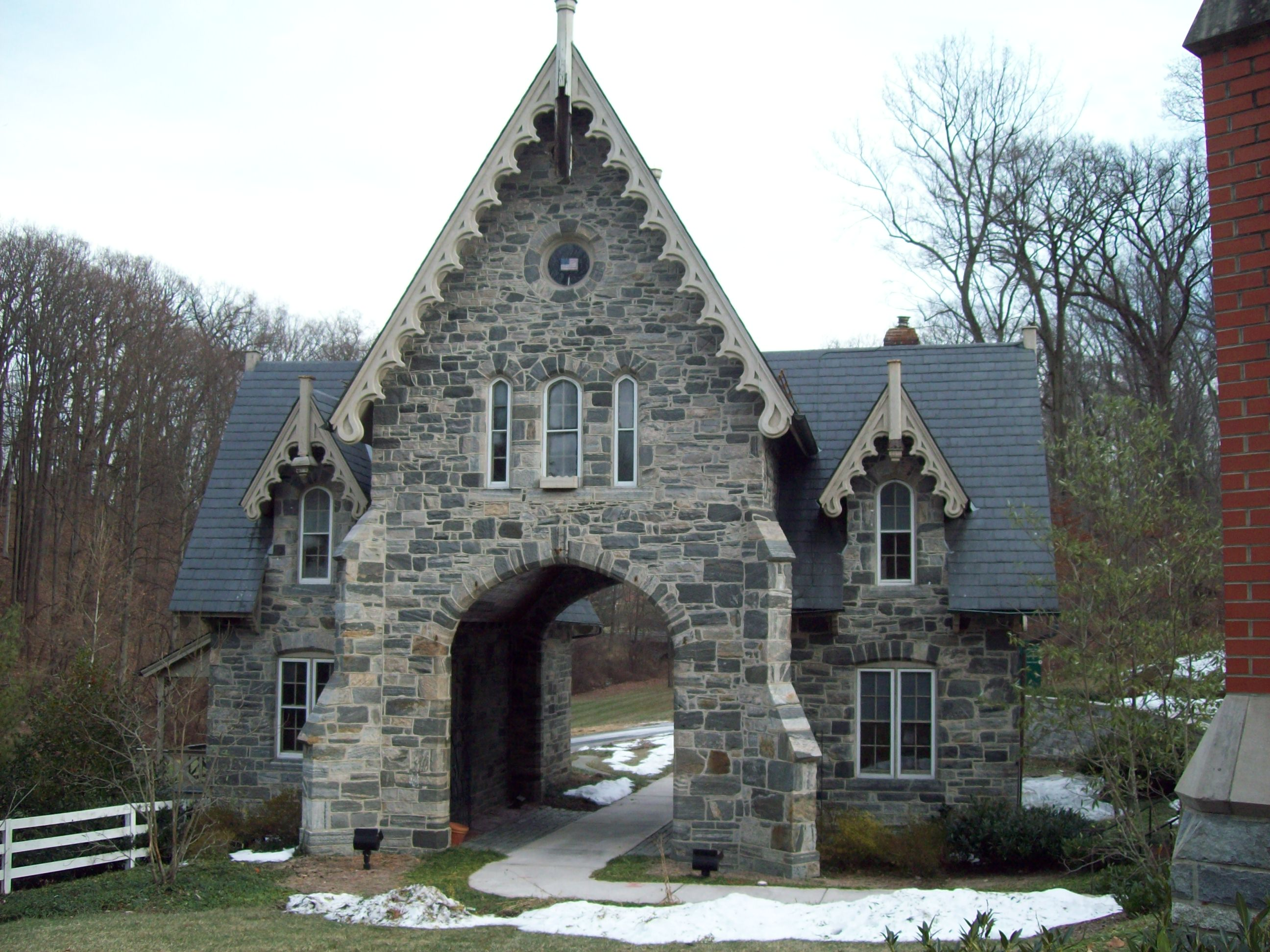
- Sheppard and Enoch Pratt Hospital Gatehouse, December 2009

Geography
- Location: Towson, Maryland, United States

Organization
- Type: Specialist

Services
- Speciality: Psychiatric hospital

History
- Former name: Sheppard Asylum
- Opened: 1891

Links
- Lists: Hospitals in Maryland
- Sheppard and Enoch Pratt Hospital and Gatehouse
- U.S. National Register of Historic Places
- U.S. National Historic Landmark
- Location within Maryland Location within the United States
- Location: Charles St., Towson, Maryland
- Coordinates: 39°23′28″N 76°37′9″W
- Area: 20.9 acres (8.5 ha)
- Built: 1860
- Architects: Calvert Vaux; Dixon, Thomas & James M.
- Architectural style: Late Gothic Revival, Norman Revival
- NRHP reference No.: 71000369

Significant dates
- Added to NRHP: November 11, 1971
- Designated NHL: November 11, 1971

The Sheppard and Enoch Pratt Hospital, known to many simply as Sheppard Pratt, is a psychiatric hospital located in Towson, a northern suburb of Baltimore, Maryland. Founded in 1853, it is one of the oldest private psychiatric hospitals in the nation. Its original buildings, designed by architect Calvert Vaux, and its Gothic gatehouse, built in 1860 to a design by Thomas and James Dixon, were designated a National Historic Landmark in 1971.

== History ==
Founded in 1853 by the Baltimore merchant Moses Sheppard, (1771-1857), with an endowment of $560,000 (~$20 million in 2021) after a visit and inspiration by the mental health rights advocate and social reformer Dorothea Lynde Dix, the hospital was originally called the Sheppard Asylum. Located on the former country estate "Mount Airy Farm" of Baltimore merchant Thomas Poultney, between the old York Road (then the Baltimore and York Turnpike) and (North) Charles Street Avenue, southwest of the suburban/rural Baltimore County seat of then called Towsontown (today's Towson). The original buildings were designed by the architect Calvert Vaux and constructed on what had previously been a 340-acre (140 ha) farm, which had been purchased in 1858. The cornerstone of the original building was laid in the spring of 1862. Earlier Gatehouse designs in 1860 by Thomas and James Dixon of Baltimore, and with hospital plans furnished by Dr. D.T. Brown of the Bloomingdale Insane Asylum, to be constructed of stone and brick with a frontage of 375 feet. Originally accommodating 150 patients, the facility was designed according to the Kirkbride Plan.

Sheppard stipulated that the following conditions were to be imposed for the Asylum:

Courteous treatment and comfort of all patients; that no patient was to be confined below ground; all were to have privacy, sunlight, and fresh air; the asylum's purpose was to be curative, combining science and experience for the best possible results; and that only income, not principal would be used to build and operate the asylum.

As a result of these financial restraints, the Asylum did not open until 1891, 34 years after Sheppard's death, and thirty-one after construction had first started. It also left it with financial uncertainty, putting its long-term future in doubt.

The future of the Asylum was greatly enhanced five years later when in 1896, the estate of Baltimore merchant, businessman, banker, steamship line owner, and philanthropist, Enoch Pratt, (1808-1896) bequeathed a substantial amount of his remaining fortune, approx. $2 million (~$63.5 million in 2021), (after founding, constructing, and endowing the city's public circulating library system, the first in the country, with the Enoch Pratt Free Library on West Mulberry Street near Cathedral Street in 1882-1886) to complete the construction and expand the asylum as originally planned decades before with the stipulation that the name be changed to "The Sheppard and Enoch Pratt Hospital". Mr. Pratt knew Mr. Sheppard as a fellow merchant on Light Street, several blocks away from his establishment on South Charles Street during his early business career. He also admired and thought well of the original Sheppard Asylum trustees for having tried to maintain faithfulness with Mr. Sheppard's requests and desires that he expressed before his death. After some legal controversy between Pratt's family members and the Maryland legal community about the explicit terms of Pratt's will and bequest, the changes and visions were approved and upheld by the Maryland courts.

In 2000, Sheppard Pratt retained the services HDR, Inc. to design a major expansion to the campus, which would be the largest addition to Sheppard Pratt since its inception. The new addition was as large as the original buildings, encompassing over 270,000 square feet (25,000 m^{2}), effectively doubling the size of the facility. with the expansion and renovation complete, patient rooms have been moved from the hospital's twin historic Victorian-era buildings to more modern facilities.

== The Retreat at Sheppard Pratt ==
The Retreat is a 22-bed unit intended for patients seeking a comprehensive evaluation and intensive treatment in a psychotherapeutic setting, operating outside standard third-party insurance arrangements. The program includes 38 hours of group programming and six to eight individual clinician sessions per week. Stays typically range from several weeks to several months, with a minimum length of stay of 20 days.[1]

The Retreat offers a multi-disciplinary treatment approach to a variety of psychiatric conditions that can be treated safely and effectively in a voluntary, unlocked environment. Individualized treatment at The Retreat includes specialized practices such as Dialectical Behavior Therapy and Transcranial Magnetic Stimulation

== See also ==
- List of National Historic Landmarks in Maryland
- National Register of Historic Places listings in Baltimore County, Maryland
