= Aeolian-Skinner =

American pipe organ manufacturer (1901–1972)

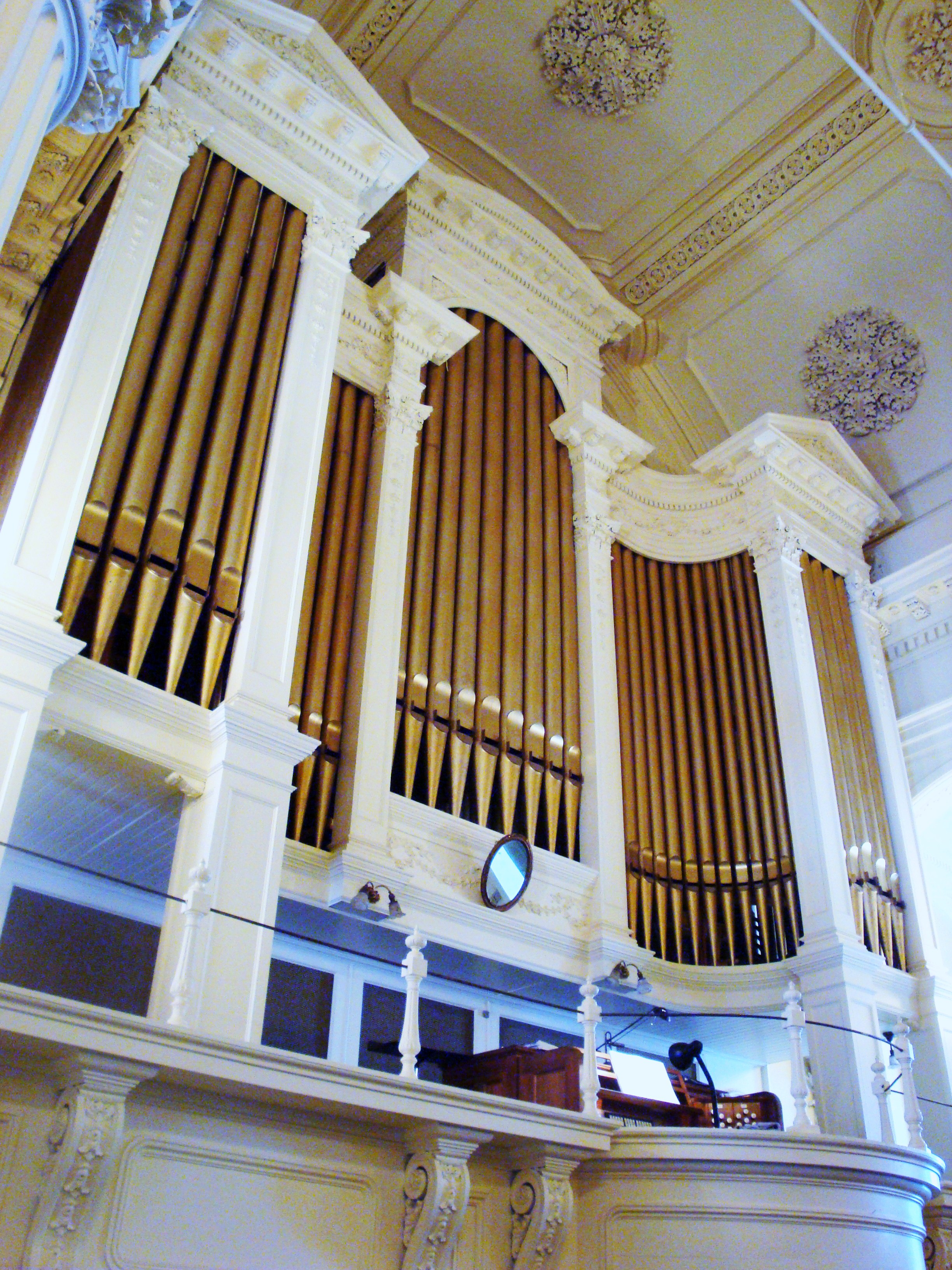
Aeolian-Skinner organ in Arlington Street Church, Boston, Massachusetts

Aeolian-Skinner Organ Company, Inc. of Boston, Massachusetts was an American builder of a large number of pipe organs from its inception as the Skinner Organ Company in 1901 until its closure in 1972. Key figures were Ernest M. Skinner (1866–1960), Arthur Hudson Marks (1875–1939), Joseph Silver Whiteford (1921-1978), and G. Donald Harrison (1889–1956). The company was formed from the merger of the Skinner Organ Company and the pipe organ division of the Aeolian Company in 1932.

== Skinner period ==
The Skinner & Cole Company was formed in 1902 as a partnership of Ernest Skinner and Cole, another former Hutchings-Votey employee. By 1904 the partnership had dissolved, and the "Ernest M. Skinner & Company" purchased the Skinner and Cole assets, in the form of the contract for the Evangelical Lutheran Church of the Holy Trinity in New York City from the former company for $1.

Between 1904 and 1910, the firm produced approximately 30 instruments, including several new instruments of Skinner's design, in the 60- to 80-stop size range.

By 1912 the firm had perfected the "Pitman Windchest" to a state of simple technical elegance. (A "wind chest" is the large box, normally built of wood, upon which the sound producing pipes are "planted", and which contains the valves and mechanisms which control the wind supply to the pipes.) The Pitman chest allows the air to be held constantly pressurized, directly at the valves located beneath each of the thousands of pipes, which increases responsiveness to the player, and eliminates noise and other problems found with the "Ventil"-style chests, which apply wind only when a stop is drawn. Virtually all major builders of electro-pneumatic action organs, including M. P. Möller, W. W. Kimball (both firms later defunct), Schantz, and Reuter, use some form of the Pitman windchest, although most have only recently begun to credit Skinner with the design and subsequent refinements that make it an industry benchmark.

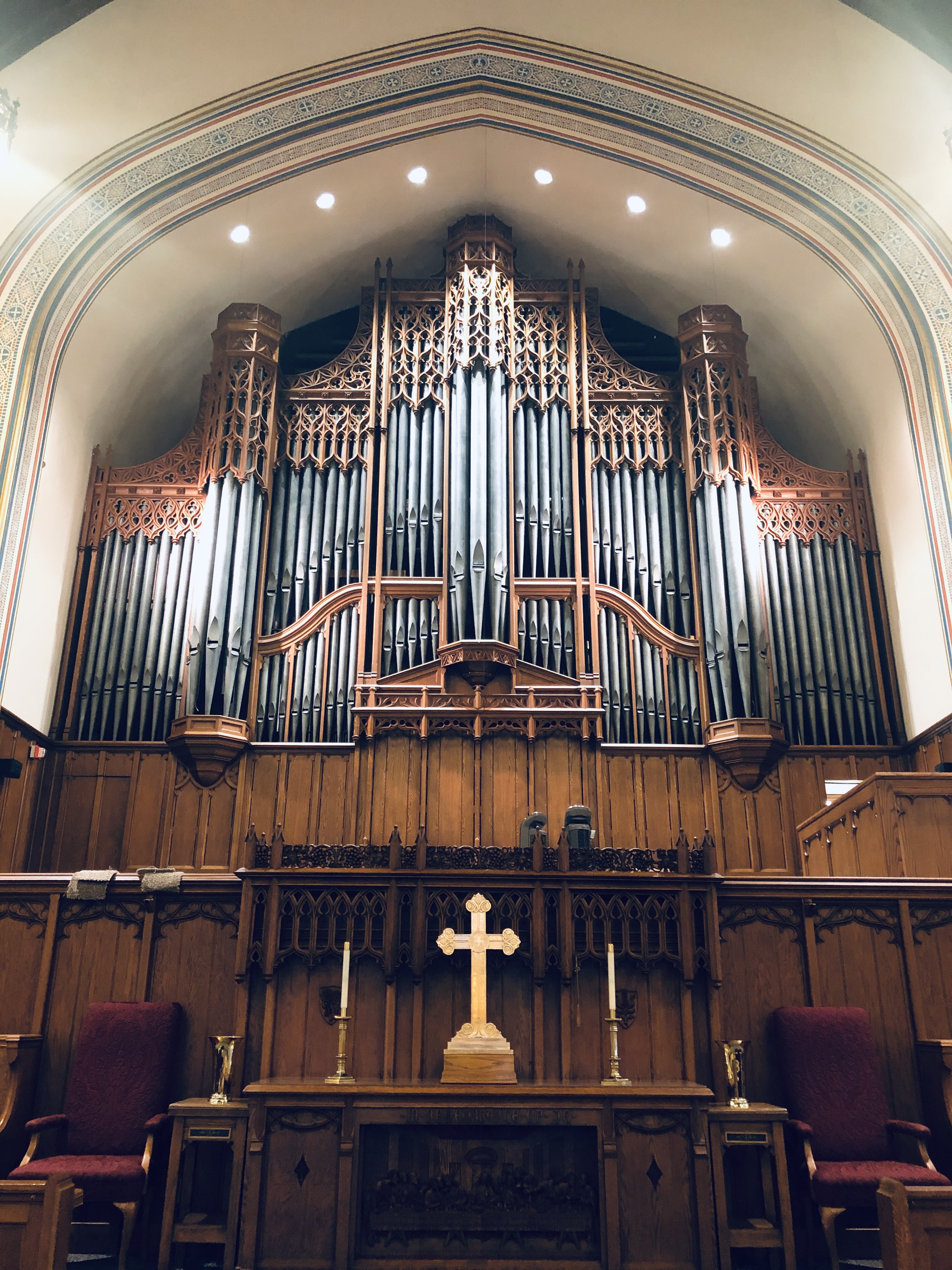
The 1928, Opus 750 at Missouri United Methodist Church in Columbia, Missouri was a favorite of organist James Thomas Quarles.

Skinner also developed and perfected numerous parts of the "actions" for the instruments, as well as the Whiffletree Shade Motor, a mechanical device that moves the expression shades in a smooth, fluid motion without the "slam" that often accompanies mechanical expression shade controls. This allowed the instruments to provide quick and responsive control of the expression (volume) levels of the different parts of the instrument.

In 1914 the Skinner Organ Factory company moved into a new factory building in the Dorchester neighborhood of Boston at Crescent Avenue and Sydney Street.

== Harrison period ==
G. Donald Harrison joined the Skinner firm in July 1927, and slowly began to influence how Skinner organs were built. After several years of conflict between Ernest Skinner and Arthur Marks, Harrison was appointed Vice-President and Tonal Director of Aeolian-Skinner in 1933. The company’s tonal philosophy continued to turn from the romantic-style orchestral instruments built under the direction of Skinner to a classically eclectic style. Organists began to look to the past to find direction for the future, and in doing so they found that they were in sympathy with the ideas being developed by Harrison. These ideas included the provision of smaller-scaled diapasons, along with more higher-pitched and mutation stops in place of large-scaled unison diapasons, color reeds and flutes.

During Harrison's tenure from 1933 until his death in 1956 (while doing tonal finishing on the organ at St. Thomas Church, New York City, which was completed by Arthur Birchall after Harrison's death), the tonal design of Aeolian-Skinner organs changed a great deal, but retained and perfected many of Ernest Skinner's mechanical innovations. The company used Skinner's Pitman windchest, for example, throughout its existence. Also the high quality and distinctive design details of the Aeolian-Skinner console were preserved.

Instruments built or rebuilt during the Harrison period include (date, consoles/ranks):

- Rochester, Minnesota: St Marys Hospital Chapel (1932)
- San Francisco, California: Grace Cathedral Opus 910 (1934, IV/125) G. Donald Harrison signature organ.
- Groton, Massachusetts: Groton School (1935, III/95)
- New Haven, Connecticut: Trinity Church on the Green (1935, III/78)
- Boston, Massachusetts: Church of the Advent (1935, III/77)
- Philadelphia, Pennsylvania: Church of the Advent (1935, III/77)
- Philadelphia, Pennsylvania: St. Mark's Episcopal Church Opus 948 (1936, IV/112) G. Donald Harrison signature organ.
- Minneapolis, Minnesota: Northrop Auditorium Opus 892C (1936, IV/102)
- Ithaca, New York: Cornell University Sage Chapel (1940, III/69)
- New York, New York: Church of St. Mary the Virgin (1942, IV/76)
- Salt Lake City, Utah: Salt Lake Tabernacle, Church of Jesus Christ of Latter-Day Saints(1948, V/204) G. Donald Harrison Signature organ
- Boston, Massachusetts: Symphony Hall (1949, IV/80) G. Donald Harrison signature organ
- St. Mark's Episcopal Church, Mt. Kisco, New York (1952) G. Donald Harrison signature organ
- Boston, Massachusetts: The First Church of Christ, Scientist Opus 1203 (1952, IV/241 )
- Jacksonville, Illinois: MacMurray College Annie Merner Chapel (1952 Opus 1150, IV/59)
- New York, New York: Cathedral of St. John the Divine (1953, IV/141) Opus 150-A first organ to have the state trumpet. G. Donald Harrison signature organ
- Rock Hill, South Carolina: Winthrop University Opus 1257 (1955, IV/78) G. Donald Harrison signature organ
- Seymour, Connecticut: Seymour Congregational Church, Opus 1262 (1955)
- New York, New York: Saint Thomas Church (Manhattan) (1956) G. Donald Harrison signature organ (Harrison died while finishing the voicing)

== Whiteford period ==
After Harrison's death in June 1956, former Vice President Joseph S. Whiteford was appointed President. Whiteford joined the company in 1948 and had distinguished himself through research in the field of musical acoustics as it relates to church music. Under his direction, Aeolian-Skinner built pipe organs for five of the foremost symphony orchestras in America. His love for vocal music led him to emphasize the role of the organ in accompanying singing. He had a charismatic personality that was well suited to the prestige of the Aeolian-Skinner name. In fact, his personal involvement secured major contracts that were directly commissioned without competing bids. His tonal work was not without criticism, including from within the company- e.g. Donald Gillett's unhappiness with Whiteford's "string quartet Greats". For more information see Dr Charles Callahan's book Aeolian-Skinner Remembered.

Instruments from the Whiteford period include:

- Detroit: Ford Auditorium (1957, III/71). Dismantled immediately prior to the auditorium being demolished in 2011. The organ will be installed in St. Aloysius Catholic Church in downtown Detroit.
- Westminster, Maryland: Baker Memorial Chapel (1958)
- Independence, Missouri: RLDS Auditorium (1959, IV/113)
- Honolulu: St. Andrew's Cathedral (1960, IV/72)
- Ypsilanti, Michigan: Eastern Michigan University Pease Auditorium (1960). Still in full working order and used for regular performances as of 2014.
- New York City: Church of the Epiphany (1962)
- Atlanta: Cathedral of St. Philip (1962, IV/98)
- New York City: Lincoln Center, Philharmonic Hall (1963, IV/98). Removed and incorporated into the Crystal Cathedral (Christ Cathedral) organ, Garden Grove, California.

After the Whiteford's resignation in 1966, John J. Tyrell, Donald M. Gillett, and Robert L. Sipe served as president until the company ceased operations in 1972.

== Recordings made by Aeolian-Skinner ==
Beginning in 1954, Aeolian-Skinner produced a series of LP records titled The King of Instruments. These LPs are devoted to the tone and history of the modern organ. Volume 1, The American Classic Organ, contains a descriptive discussion written over both sides of the LP cover by Tyler Turner and Joseph Whiteford on the beginnings of the American classic organ. The five recorded sections on the record, with G. Donald Harrison as narrator describing the five selections, are "I-Principals", "II-Flutes", "III-Strings", "IV-Reeds", and "V-Mixtures and Mutations". Organ demonstrations come from the Aeolian-Skinner organs of St. John the Divine, Symphony Hall, St. Paul's Cathedral (Boston), and First Presbyterian Church, Kilgore, Texas.

- Volume 1: "The American Classic Organ"
- Volume 2: "Organ Literature-Bach to Langlais"
- Volume 3: "Organ Recital" – Robert Owen, Christ Church; Bronxville, New York
- Volume 4: Edgar Hilliar at St. Mark's; Mount Kisco, New York
- Volume 5: "Music of Richard Purvis" – Grace Cathedral; San Francisco, California
- Volume 6: "The Cathedral of St. John the Divine" Alec Wyton-Organist
- Volume 7 "Marilyn Mason in Recital" St. John's Chapel; Groton, Massachusetts
- Volume 8: "Norman Coke-Jephcott at St. John the Divine
- Volume 9: "The Mother Church; Boston, Massachusetts" – Ruth Barrett Phelps
- Volume 10: "Music of the Church" – Organ and choir recital at the 1st Presbyterian Church in Kilgore, Texas
- Volume 11: "Henry Hokans at All Saints" (Worcester, Massachusetts
- Volume 12: "Pierre Cochereau at Symphony Hall" (Boston, Massachusetts
- AS313: "Organ Music and Vocal Solos" – Ruth Barrett Phelps and Frederick Jagel, tenor, at The Mother Church, Boston
- AS315: "Catharine Crozier Program I" – RLDS Auditorium, Independence, Missouri
- AS316: "Catharine Crozier Program II" – RLDS Aufitorium, Independence, Missouri
- AS317: "Phillip Steinhaus" – organ of All Saints Church, Pontiac, Michigan
- AS318: "Two Great Organs" Albert Russell, organs of Philharmonic Hall, New York, and Asylum Hill Cong. Church, Hartford, Connecticut
- AS319: "Duruflé Requiem" Albert Russell and choir
- AS320: "John Weaver Playing Liszt and Mozart" – Lutheran Church of the Holy Trinity, New York
- AS322: "Maurice and Marie-Madeleine Duruflé" – organ of Christ Church Cathedral, St. Louis, Missouri
- AS323: "Ronald Arnatt" – organ of Christ Church Cathedral, St. Louis, Missouri
- AS325: "Clyde Holloway" – organ of National Presbyterian Church, Washington, DC
- AS327: "Robert Anderson in a Program of 20th Century Music" – organ of Zumbro Lutheran Congregation, Rochester, Minnesota
- AS328: "Robert Anderson in a Program of 19th Century Music" – organ of Zumbro Lutheran Congregation, Rochester, Minnesota
- AS329: "Robert Anderson in a Program of 18th Century Music" – organ of Zumbro Lutheran Congregation, Rochester, Minnesota
- AS 306: Ruth Phelps at the Mother Church; Boston, Massachusetts
- AS 322: Maurice and Marie-Madeleine Duruflé at Christ Church Cathedral; St. Louis, Missouri
- AS 326: Alexander Boggs Ryan at the Cathedral of Christ the King; Kalamazoo, Michigan
- ASC 501: "Two Great Organs" Albert Russell, organs of Philharmonic Hall, New York, and Asylum Hill Cong. Church, Hartford, Connecticut (Ampex reel-to-reel tape)
- ASC 502: Catharine Crozier at the RLDS Auditorium, Independence MO (No. 1309, 1959) – Program I (Reubke, Langlais, Roger-Ducasse, Alain) (Ampex reel-to-reel tape)
- ASC 503: Catharine Crozier at the RLDS (Community of Christ) Auditorium; Independence Missouri (Ampex reel-to-reel tape)
