= Moses Sheppard =

American merchant (1771–1857)

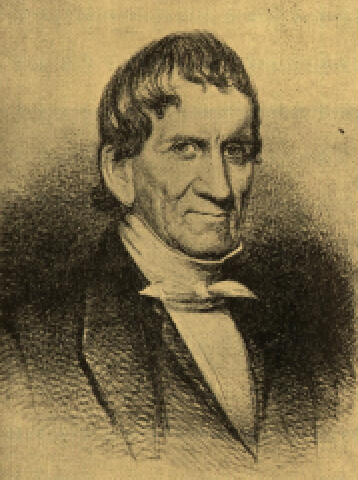
Moses Sheppard

Moses Sheppard (1771-1857) was a Baltimore businessman, a Friend (Quaker), a philanthropist, and founder of the now-Sheppard and Enoch Pratt Hospital.

Born in Philadelphia, Pennsylvania, in 1771, to Nathan Sheppard (1726-) and Sarah Shoemaker, Sheppard's family, loyal to England, lost a great majority of its property during the Revolutionary War when they moved to Canada to avoid the violence. The family returned to America after the war to live on a plot of land provided by Elisha Tyson, a cousin and benefactor of Sheppard during his youth. Sheppard began working as an errand boy and clerk for Tyson's brother-in-law, John Mitchell. Within a few years, he became a partner with Mitchell, eventually taking over the business upon Mitchell’s death, a business he retired from in 1832.

Fully aware of his own lack of schooling, Sheppard was dedicated to the cause of education for much of his life. He helped raise money for the founding of Fairhill Boarding School for Quaker youth who lived too far from meeting houses. Like many Quakers of the time, he was active in the abolitionism movement and an active supporter of the Protective Society of Maryland to Protect Free Negroes, the American Antislavery Society, and the Society of Friends Indian Affairs Committee. Speaking before the Maryland Historical Society in 1854, he compared the treatment of slaves in America and Jamaica (to America's detriment). He also helped in the payment for the education of several colored men who became important in the founding of Liberia, among them Dr. Samuel Ford McGill. Sheppard lobbied the Maryland General Assembly, stopping legislation that would have banished free African-Americans from the state.

In Baltimore, as well as being a prominent merchant, Sheppard was also commissioner of the prison. Even before this, he was exposed to conditions in the city jail through his role on the Inspection Commission of the City Jail and introduced the manufacturing shop into the Baltimore City Jail. Through this activity, Sheppard became aware of the inhumane treatment accorded to persons with mental illnesses, or "lunatics," as they were then called. Appalled by this treatment and in accordance with the ideas of the Society of Friends, Sheppard sought to improve conditions for those suffering from mental illness. In 1851, he was visited by prominent social reformer Dorothea Lynde Dix, who enlisted Sheppard in her effort to establish a state institution for the humane care of the insane. Sheppard approached and obtained a charter from the Maryland General Assembly for the construction of an asylum to be located on a 340-acre (1.4 km²) farm in Towson, Maryland, just north of Baltimore. This facility, though, would be private and not a state-run institution.

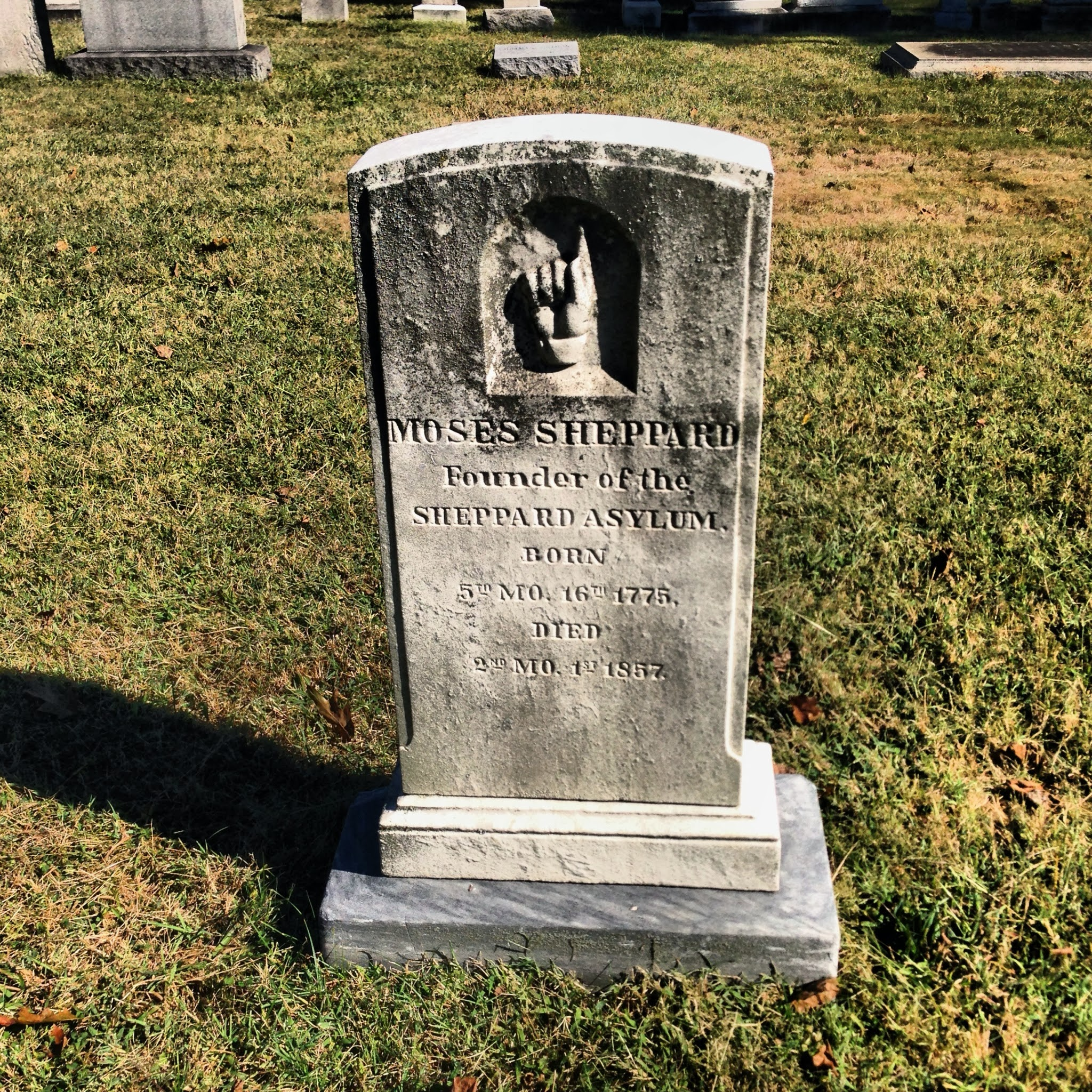
Grave of Sheppard at Green Mount Cemetery

Upon his death in 1857, Sheppard dedicated his entire fortune to building the asylum. He was buried in Green Mount Cemetery. Sheppard stipulated the following: “Courteous treatment and comfort of all patients; that no patient was to be confined below ground; all were to have privacy, sunlight, and fresh air; the asylum's purpose was to be curative, combining science and experience for the best possible results; and that only income, not principal, would be used to build and operate the asylum.” Because of the financial restrictions that Sheppard put in place, the asylum, designed by Calvert Vaux, did not open until 1891, almost 34 years after Sheppard's death.

When opened, the asylum was known as The Sheppard Asylum, though that name would change in 1896 to The Sheppard and Enoch Pratt Hospital, after fellow Baltimore merchant Enoch Pratt bequeathed a substantial portion of his fortune to the project.
