= Tivoli (Baltimore, Maryland) =

Historic house in Maryland, United States

- U.S. National Register of Historic Places
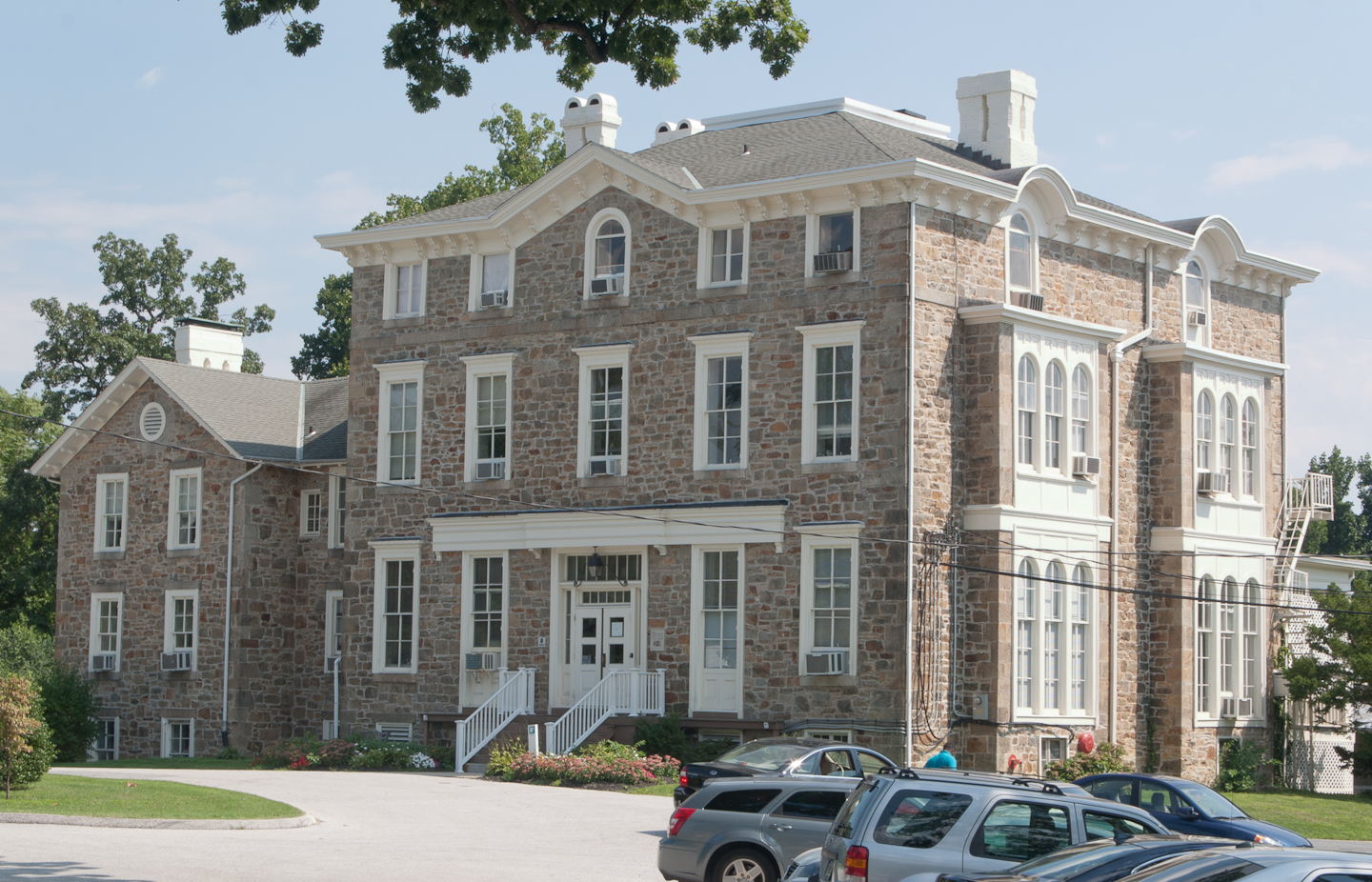
- Tivoli Mansion, August 2011

- Location within Baltimore Location within Maryland Location within the United States
- Location: 1301 Woodbourne Ave., Baltimore, Maryland
- Coordinates: 39°21′12″N 76°35′33″W
- Area: 3 acres (1.2 ha)
- Built: 1855
- Architectural style: Italianate
- NRHP reference No.: 80001791
- Added to NRHP: October 9, 1980

Tivoli is a historic home located at Baltimore, Maryland, United States. It is a random stone ashlar masonry structure built about 1855 and consisting of a three-story, symmetrical Italianate main block, with a contemporary two-story, T-shaped service wing. It contains the administrative and clinical offices, the infirmary, and dining hall of the Woodbourne Center, also known as Nexus-Woodbourne Family Healing, a mental health treatment center for adolescents. It was the summer residence of Enoch Pratt, who purchased the property in 1870 and died here in 1896. It was also a home of Charles S. Abell, one of the owners of the Baltimore Sun Papers and whose wife gave the property to Woodbourne in 1925.

Tivoli was listed on the National Register of Historic Places in 1980.
