= Henry Adams (mechanical engineer) =

American mechanical engineer (1858-1929)

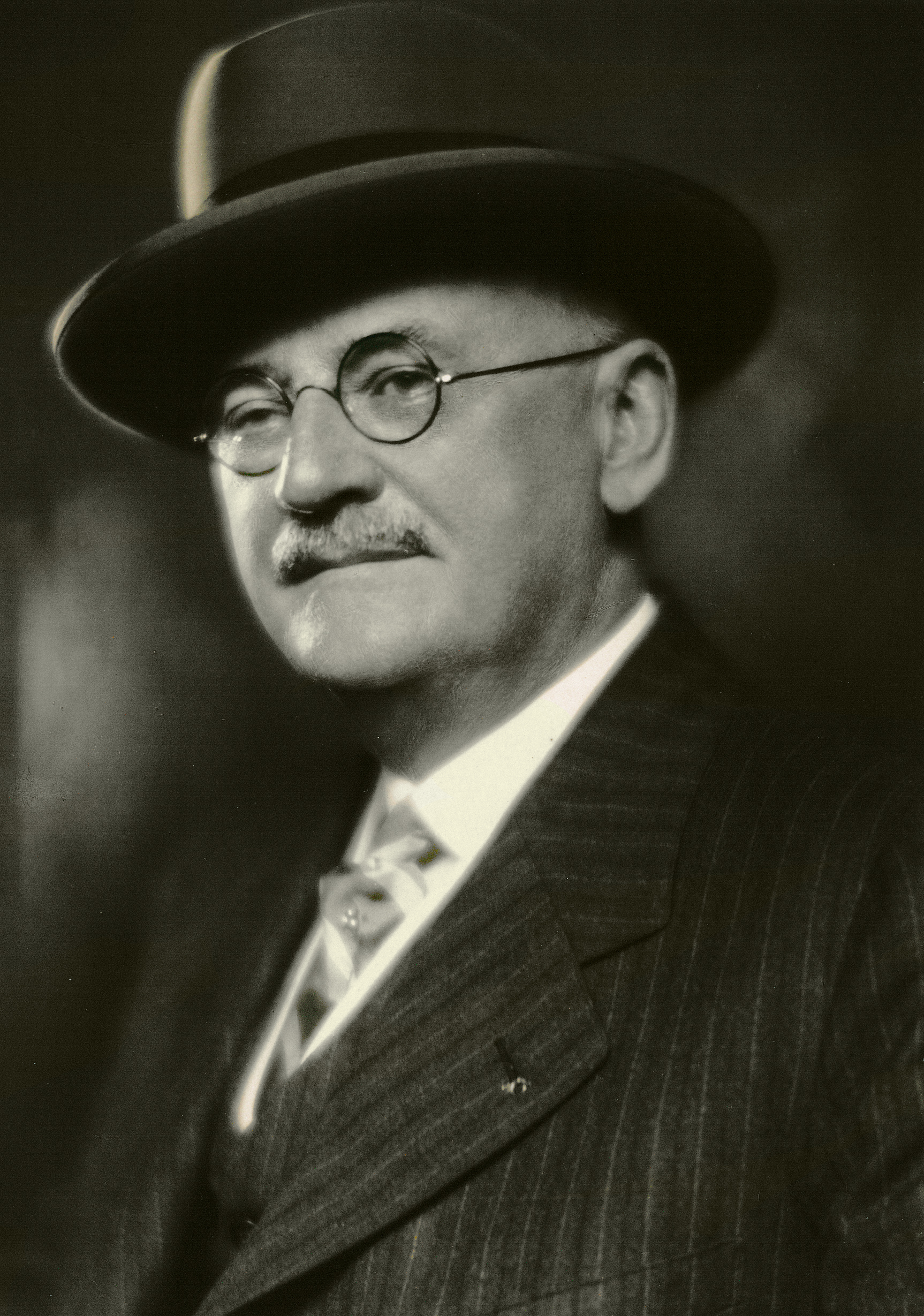
- Born: February 11, 1858; Duisburg
- Died: December 9, 1929 (aged 71)
- Occupation: Mechanical Engineer

Henry Adams (February 11, 1858 – December 9, 1929) was an American mechanical engineer. He emigrated at age 22 to Baltimore from Duisburg, Kingdom of Prussia, having been educated as a building engineer. He later worked with the District of Columbia government buildings, and established a longstanding private practice in Baltimore, Maryland.

== Public life ==
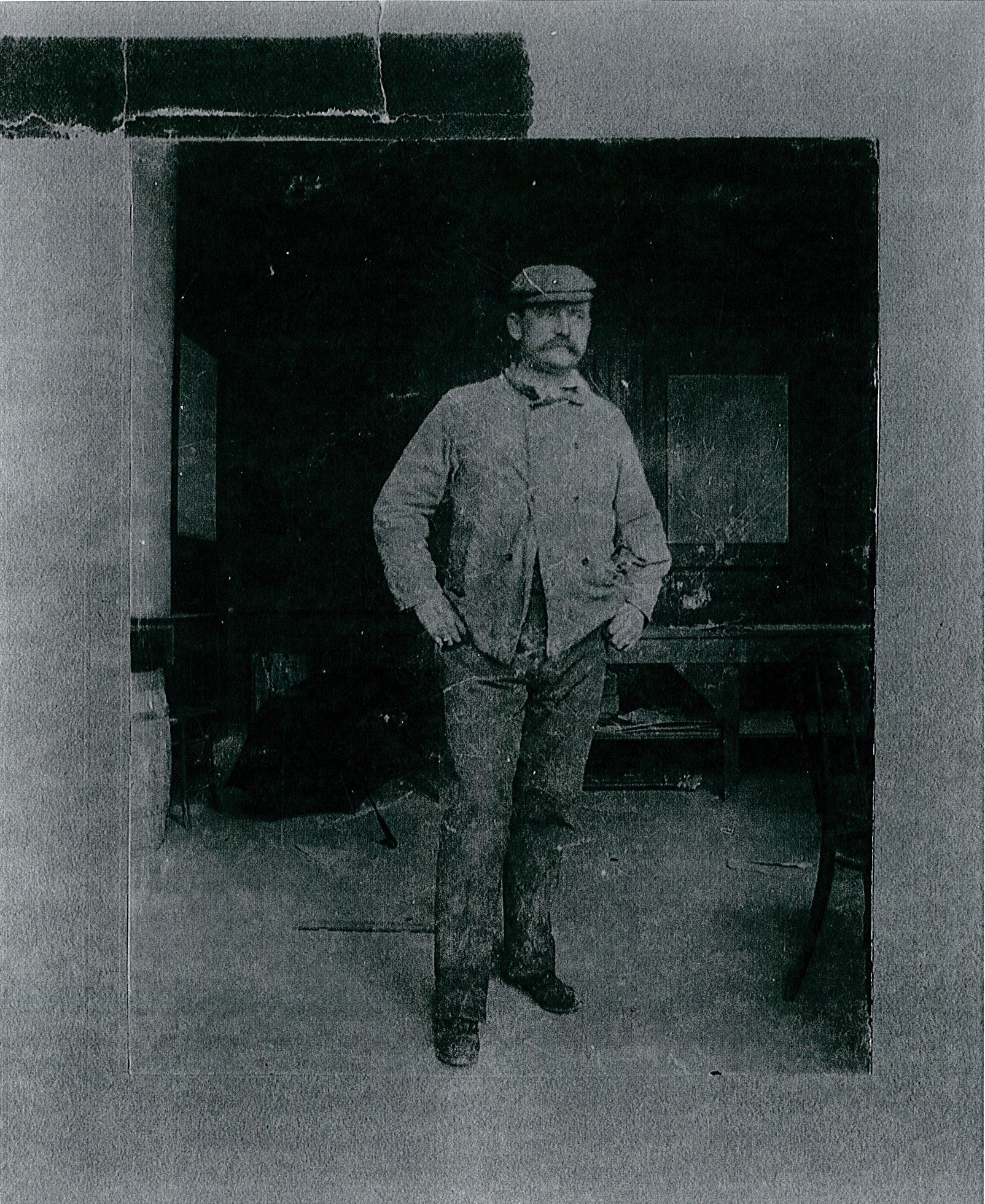
Henry Adams as a working man

In Baltimore, he first worked for builder Benjamin F. Bennett. In 1886, he became a heating and ventilating engineer with the Office of the Supervising Architect of the United States Department of the Treasury. In 1894 he joined the American Society of Heating and Ventilating Engineers (ASHVE) as one of 75 charter members. He served on the organization's Compulsory Legislation committee. He later served as ASHVE president (from 1899 to 1900), on the board of managers, and participated on their council.

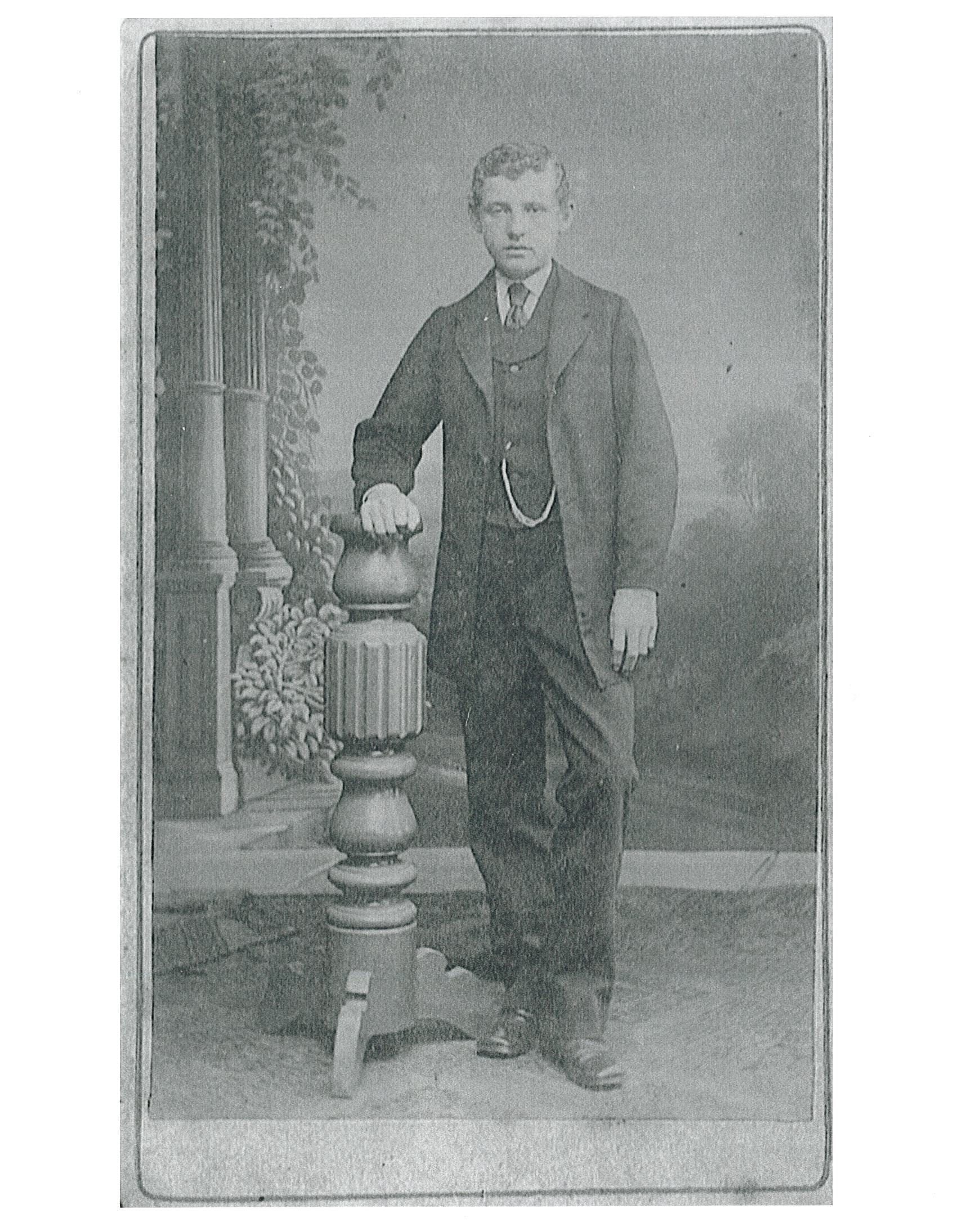
Henry Adams as a young man

He was president of the board of the Maryland Institute in Baltimore, currently known as the Maryland Institute College of Art (MICA). He taught at the institute for 12 years then he participated as a board member and later as president of the board (until his death 45 years later). Adams served as a Federal Fuel Administration engineer for Maryland and Delaware during World War I.

The press of his work was great, but it did not prevent him paying a great deal of attention to matters of public interest. He was a charter member of the Engineers' Club of Baltimore and a touching tribute was paid him in that organization's official organ, The Baltimore Engineer. "Henry Adams," the memorial article said, was a good citizen, a just man, a capable engineer, full of charity, and died beloved by all who knew him. Baltimore, therefore, mourns his loss and will always cherish the thought and belief that the world was better for his life."

== Professional life ==
Henry Adams received his early education in Germany but came to the United States to seek a wider field of activity in 1880. In a short time he had won a position of prominence in his chosen profession, engineering. He was appointed Chief Engineer of the Office of the supervising Architect of the United States Government in Washington, DC which was a position he filled with distinction for 18 years. Upon his resignation, he opened business office in Baltimore in 1898; the company became Henry Adams, LLC which still exists today in Towson, Maryland. He practiced as a consulting engineer until the time of his death.

Over the course of his career, he completed important work for the United States Government, the State of Maryland, the City of Baltimore and many corporations of national scope.

His engineering design is also found in several Baltimore buildings: the Bromo Seltzer Tower, Maryland Institute and the Baltimore Museum of Art, Belvedere Hotel, and the first renovation of the Baltimore Courthouse. As a federal engineer, he designed the mechanical system for Ellis Island. He oversaw mechanical equipment design for the Peking Union Medical College in China, and designed equipment for the Masonic temple in Manila.

== Family life ==
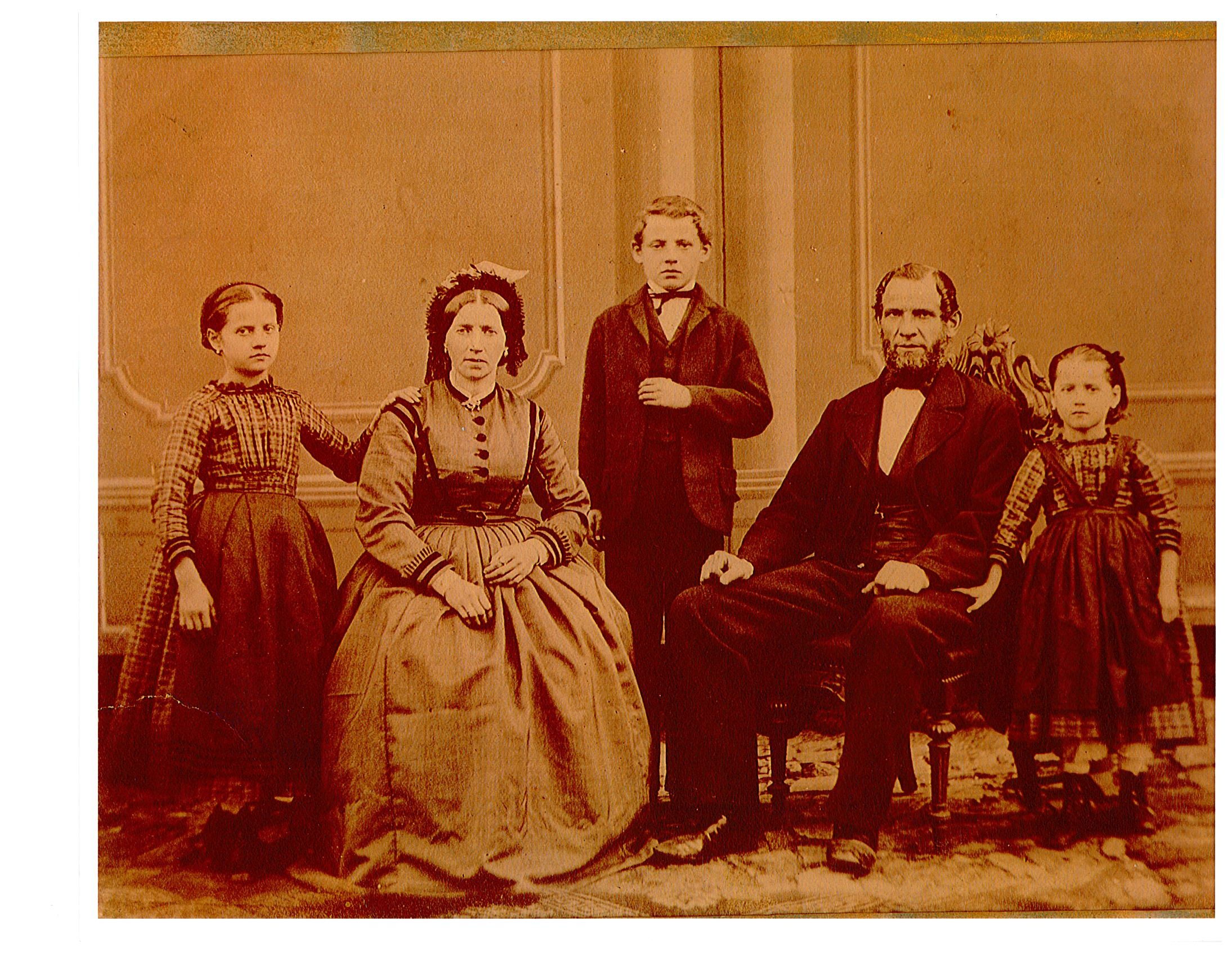
Henry Adams as a young man with his mother, father, and two sisters.

Married to Mary Elizabeth Klingelhofer, whose parents, John E and Mary Klingelhofer, were Baltimore bakers who had emigrated from Hessen, Germany. Adams had three sons: Otto Eugene Adams (architect), Ernest H. Adams and Clarence T. Adams (engineers).

== Henry Adams scholarship ==
A college scholarship was established by the firm, Henry Adams, LLC, in the memory of Adams. The endowment is coordinated by ASHRAE.

== Sources ==
- Making it work on the inside; Engineering: For 100 years, Henry Adams Inc. has made some of the finest structures in the mid-Atlantic region function properly.; Shanon D. Murray. The Sun. Baltimore, Md.: Apr 26, 1998. pg. 1.F - - ProQuest document ID: 29147560
- The History of Henry Adams Consulting Engineers
- ASME History and Heritage (1980). Mechanical Engineers in America Born Prior to 1861: A Biographical Dictionary. New York: ASME. LCCN 79-57364. OCLC 6579756.
