= McGill family =

Prominent Americo-Liberian family

The McGill family of Monrovia, Liberia, was a free African-American family from Baltimore, Maryland, who emigrated to Monrovia in the 19th century. Among the early American settlers in Liberia, the McGills became established as one of the most prominent early Americo-Liberian families. Daguerreotypes of the McGill family can be found in the Library of Congress. Members occupied colonial offices, and they are mentioned in the African Repository magazine published by the American Colonization Society.

== Immigration to Liberia ==
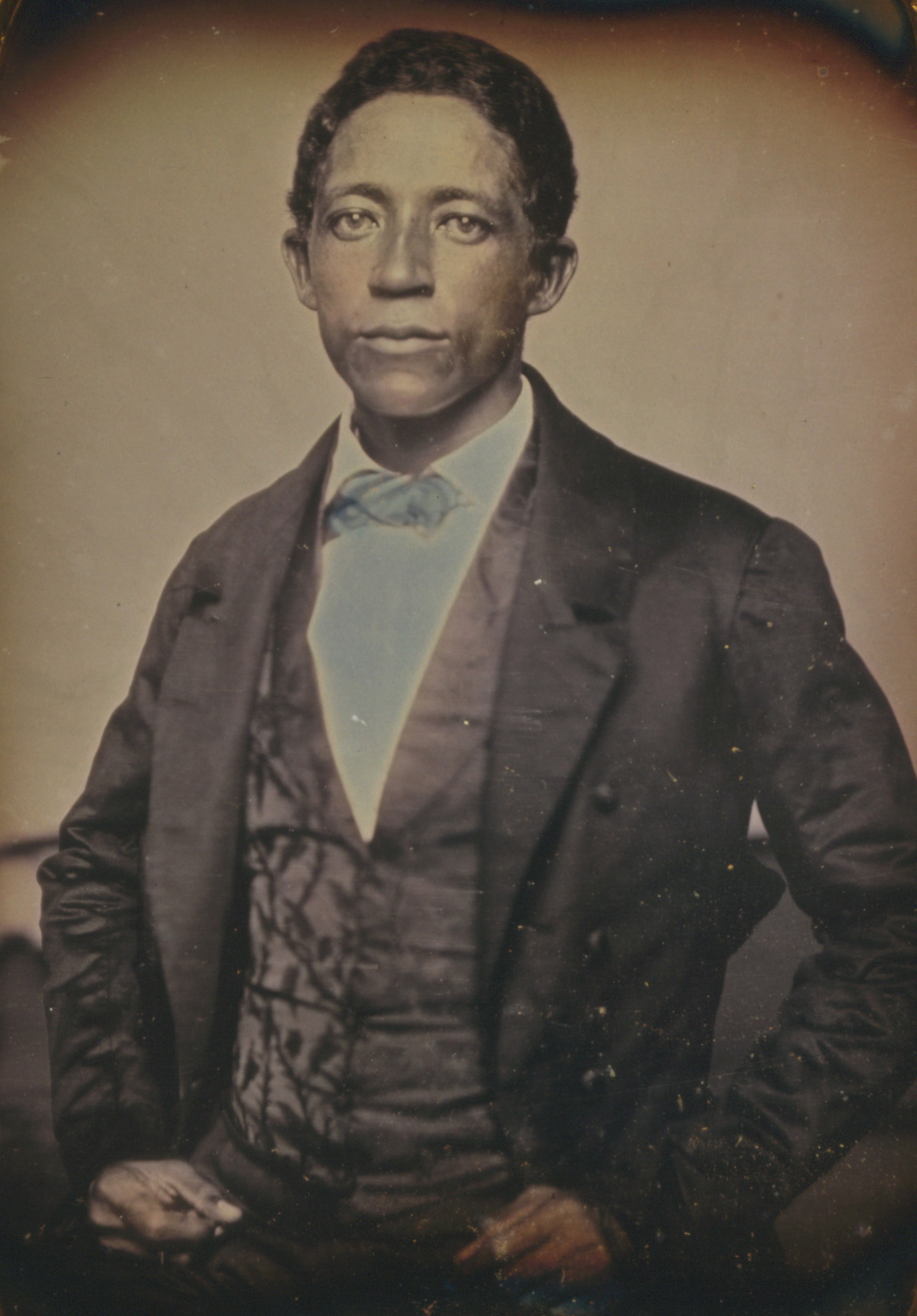
Urias McGill

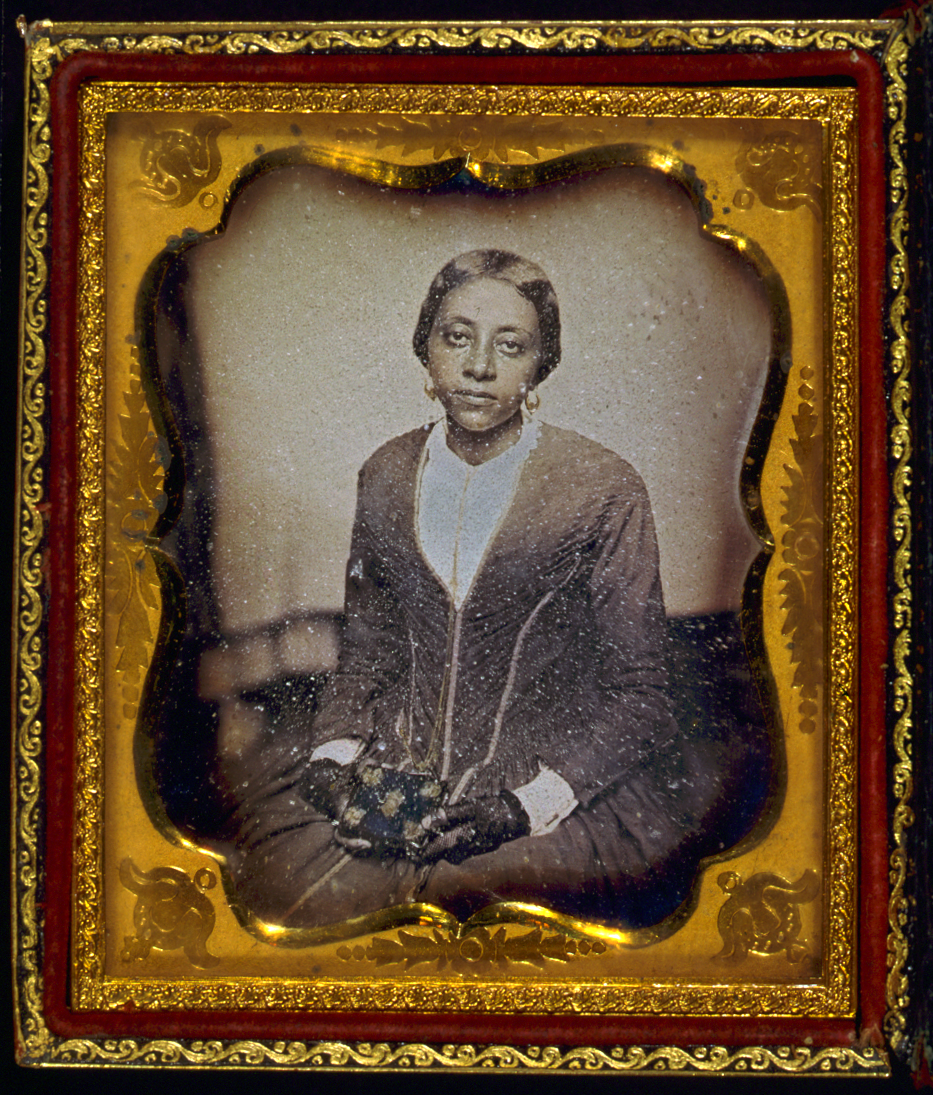
Likely Sarah McGill Russwurm

George R. and Angelina McGill emigrated to Liberia aboard the Reaper with several members of their family and arrived in Monrovia in February 1831. Shortly after, Angelina died. Some of the McGill family settled at Cape Palmas, south of Monrovia. George McGill, however, remained in Monrovia, where he became a wealthy merchant and Methodist preacher; two of his four sons followed suit.

George McGill also served as the acting colonial agent of the American Colonization Society from September 24, 1833, to January 1, 1834. Brothers Urias and James McGill partnered in 1854 to establish the Urias A. McGill & Brother trading company. Later on the name was changed to McGill Brothers when their two other brothers, Samuel and R. S. McGill, joined them in the trading business. The McGill Brothers company established many warehouses and numerous stores. They were among the first successful Americo-Liberian trading families.

== Members of the family ==
- Urias McGill (merchant)
- Sarah McGill Russwurm, wife of John Brown Russwurm
- James McGill (American Colonist)
- Samuel Ford McGill (doctor, merchant, graduate of Dartmouth College)
- R. S. McGill
- Edwin Urias McGill. Son Urias McGill
- Rick Betton-Desheild. Great-grandson of Edwin Urias McGill
- Corinna McGill. Daughter of Urias McGill
- Edrinna McGill Moosman. Grand-daughter of Urias McGill (An American Model-Actress & Entrepreneur)
- Lance Bell. Great-Grand son of Urias McGill
- Corinna Moosman. Great-granddaughter of Urias McGill
- Devin McGill. Great-Grand son of Urias McGill

They were members of the largely mixed-race Americo-Liberian community, as they had visibly light skin and European ancestry.

Two portraits of members of the McGill family were shown on a segment of African American Lives presented by Henry Louis Gates; one of the members of the family shown was Urias McGill, known as the "Merchant of Monrovia" Daguerreotypes of the McGill family are held in the Library of Congress as they were among the early 19th-century colonizers of Liberia.

== See also ==
- Joseph Jenkins Roberts - first president of Liberia
- Stephen Allen Benson - second president of Liberia
- Quander family
- Syphax family
