= Kelso Home for Girls =

Coordinates: 39°20′49″N 76°45′38″W

- Interactive map of the Kelso Home for Girls area

General information
- Type: Orphanage
- Location: Baltimore, Maryland,, U.S.
- Opened: September 27, 1925

The Kelso Home for Girls, formerly the Kelso Home and Orphan Asylum in Baltimore, Maryland, was a 19th-century orphanage and school building for girls on East Baltimore Street in the Jonestown/Old Town neighborhood, east of the Jones Falls. It was founded by businessman and philanthropist Thomas Kelso, (1784–1878), a former member of the old Methodist Episcopal Church, and inaugurated in January 1874. Formerly the Towson Family YMCA, it is now the Y of Central Maryland Towson Family Center.

== History ==
Relocation of the Kelso Home for Girls to Towson took place September 27, 1925. Originally, it was thought that the campus would accommodate both boys and girls, but with the advent of donated property in Eldersburg, Maryland, the boys were located to the Strawbridge Home for Boys. The site was purchased for $300,000 from the heirs of Thomas W. Offutt who had acquired it from the Amos Matthews / Woodbine estate, to erect the home on its 17-acre (6.9 ha) natural campus at 600 West Chesapeake avenue, Towson.

The design of the Towson facility is credited to Otto Eugene Adams, a Maryland architect. The original building, a brick Colonial structure, contained accommodations for 80 girls, an assembly hall, infirmary, play rooms, and other features. Several outbuildings were to have been added at a later date, but were never completed. Thomas Hicks & Son Inc., were contracted to erect the building, the original cost being estimated at $100,000.

A dedication of the completed home, presided over by Methodist Episcopal Bishop William McDowell, occurred in 1925. Several prominent Methodists and other friends of the institution attended the dedicatory services, including Revs. Dr. F. R. Bayley, Dr. J. B. Gillum, and Dr. E. T. Mowbray, district superintendents of the Baltimore Conference of the Methodist Episcopal Church; Louis Moller, president of the board of trustees of the home; Walter Kirwan, secretary to the board of managers for the home; and Mrs. Ella J. Kilcourse, superintendent of the home. Milton W. Gatch, lay organizer of fundraising for the new home, officially presented it to the bishop. Accounts from the attending guests describe the home's interior appointments as having wide hallways and a bright living room with cretonne curtains, that opened into a sun parlor. The home's dining room was furnished with Windsor chairs and tables. The smaller children were grouped into dormitories, having ivory-colored woodwork and beds, while the older girls were to be settled into single and double rooms that had mahogany-colored furniture.

In 1958, under the direction of W. Gibbs McKenney, president of the board of the home, the campus and structure were sold to the Baltimore YMCA organization for use as the Towson Family YMCA branch. The Kelso Home organization had 85 years of service behind it at the time (1958) the charity moved from Towson. The girls orphanage was named for its original benefactor, Thomas Kelso, (1784–1878), who began the charity at a location in eastern downtown Baltimore neighborhood of Jonestown/Old Town, east of the Jones Falls.

The Y of Central Maryland completed a master plan for Towson in 1995, then generated a "feasibility study and preliminary design" for phased renovation of what would be a 60,000-square-foot (5,600 m^{2}) facility in 2000. In January 2008 those schemes were superseded by a plan to raze all the buildings on the site.

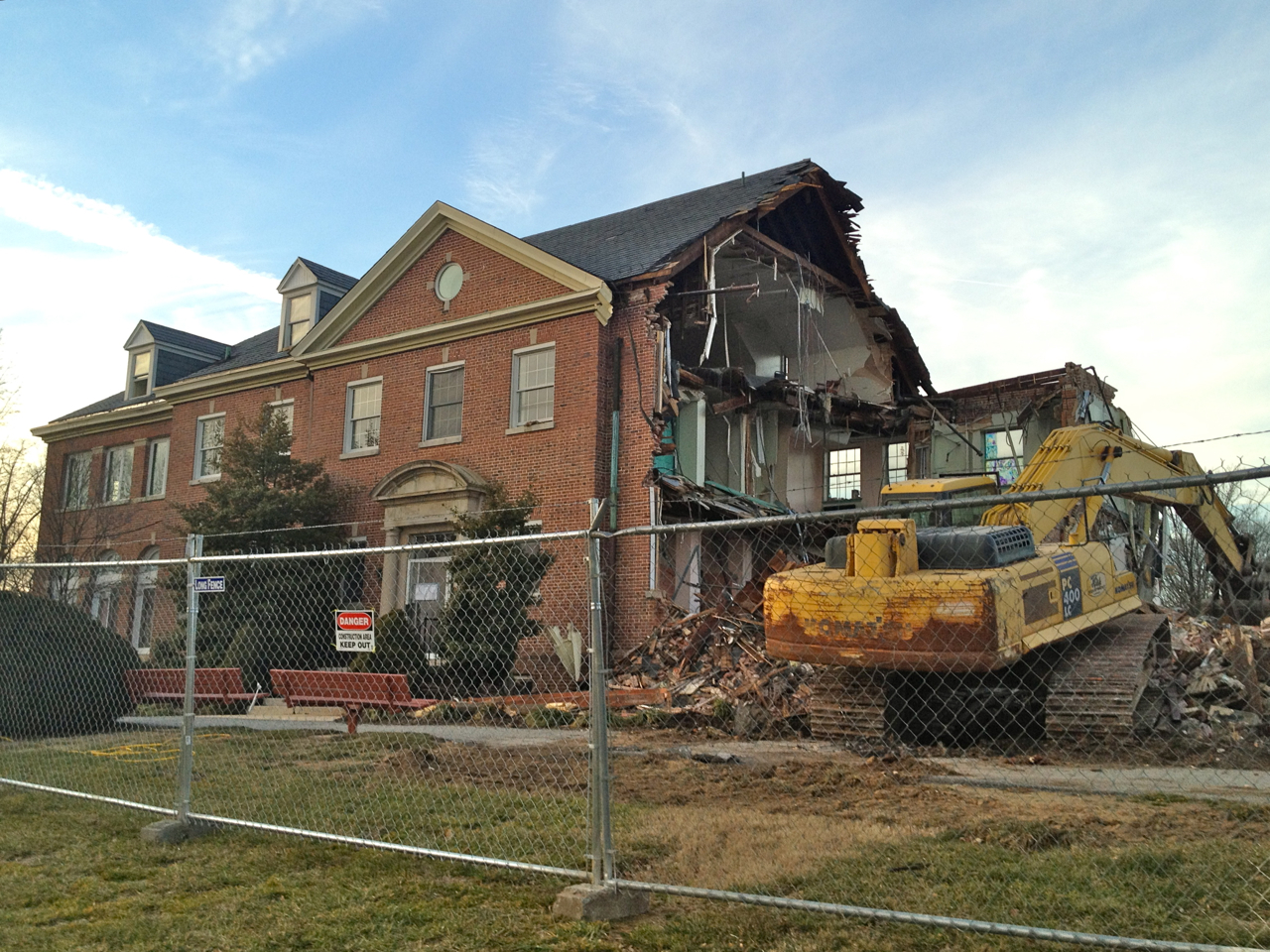
Demolition of the Kelso Home building - front facade

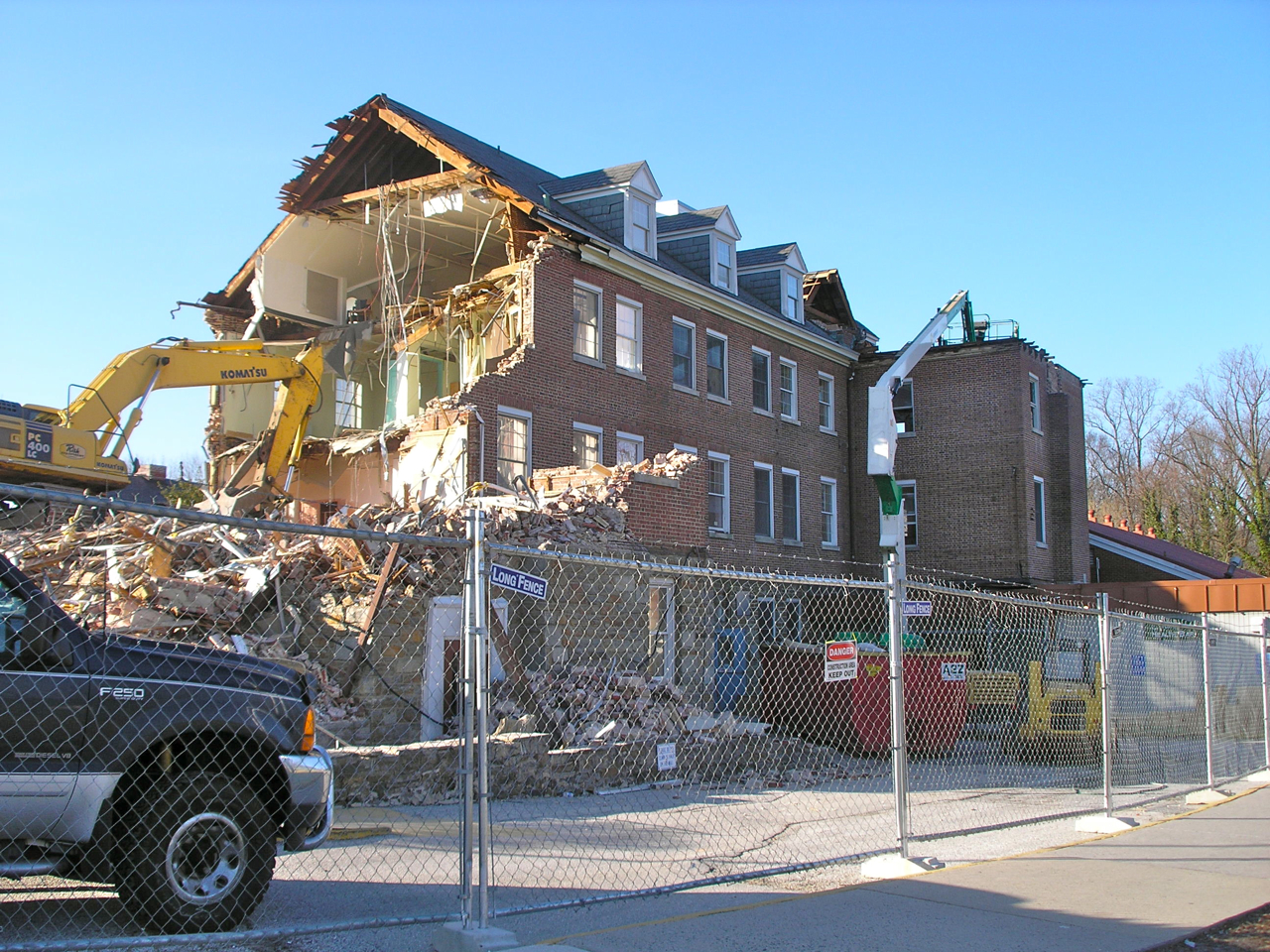
Demolition of the Kelso Home building - view from existing fitness-center entry

Baltimore County government and the current owner, Y of Central Maryland, are involved in an arrangement where the county would purchase 4 to 5 acres (about 2 ha) of the property for use as recreational fields. Design of a new 45,000 s.f. facility, to be begun in 2010, was unveiled by the YMCA of Central Maryland at a fundraiser. Development as stated "specifically designed to garner LEED certification" will not however seek credit available under that programs 'Materials and Resources (MR)' Credits 1/1.1 or 1.2. for 'Building Reuse'. Plans are to raze all existing structures after completion of the new facility.
