= Baker Memorial Chapel =

Coordinates: 39°35′1.5″N 77°0′8″W

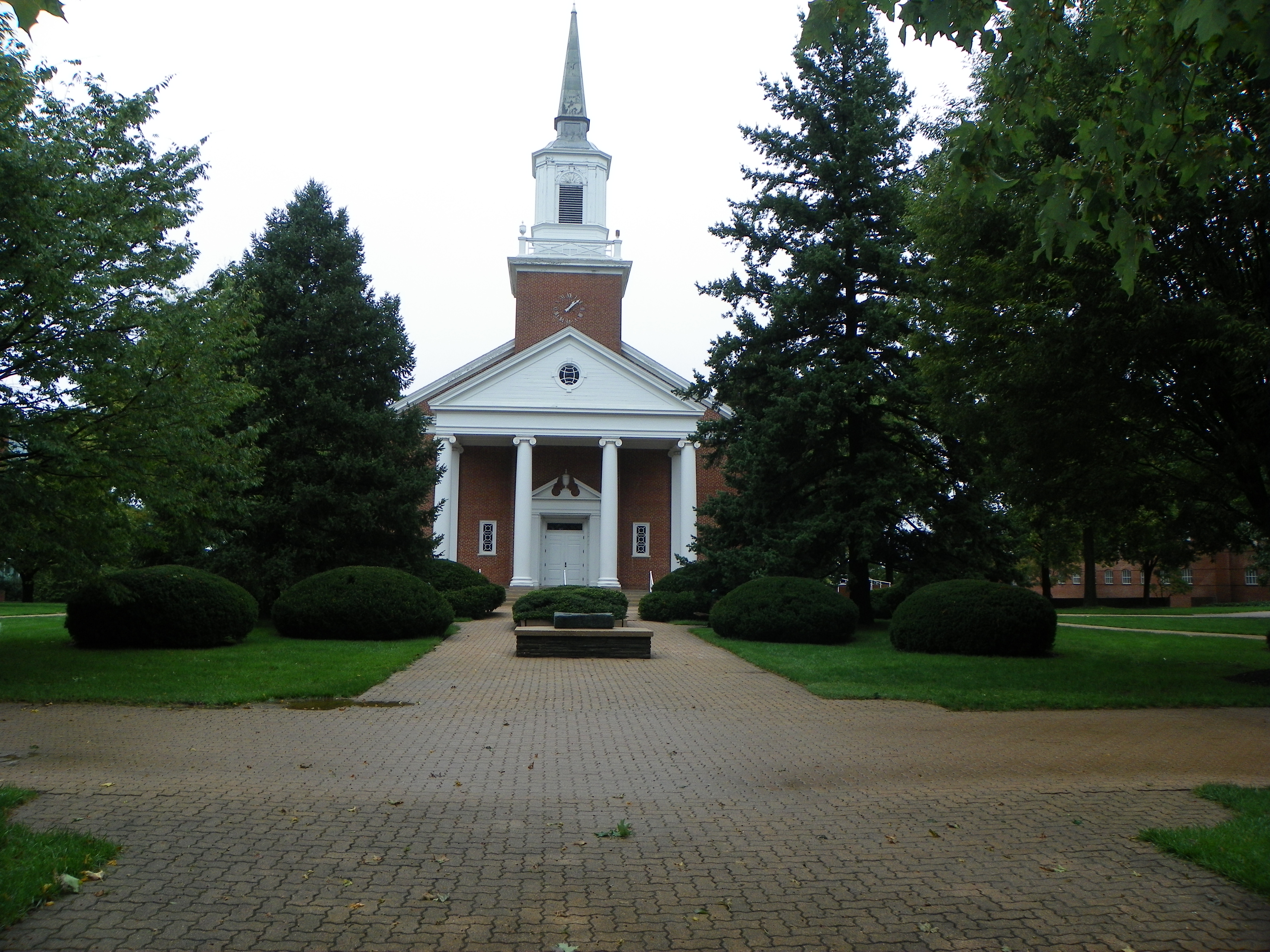
Baker Memorial Chapel in 2011

Baker Memorial Chapel is a building on the campus of McDaniel College, in Westminster, Maryland, that was dedicated April 20, 1958. The chapel was built in memory of W.G. Baker, Joseph D. Baker, Daniel Baker, and Sarah Baker Thomas. When the initial endowment was announced in 1955 both the donor's identity and the identity of the memorialized individuals were unknown. As conceived, the new chapel was to have a capacity of approximately 900, and was "expected to be of Georgian colonial architecture in keeping with the design of other recent buildings on the campus."

The chapel was designed by architects Otto Eugene Adams and E.G. Riggs, of Baltimore. The Chapel steeple, 113 feet tall, is visible for miles around and was originally topped by a stainless steel cross 6 feet in height. The wood panels of the chancel were designed to complement the antique organ console which was originally in the Bruton Parish Church, at Williamsburg, Virginia. The organ in the new chapel was given by two alumni, father and son, Roger J. Whiteford, a prominent Washington attorney and graduate in 1906, and his son Joseph S. Whiteford, a graduate in 1943, president of the Aeolian-Skinner Organ Company, Boston, Mass. The organ, with its 2,310 pipes, is held to be the largest in the area. The Whitefords also gave the carillon installed in the steeple.
