= Cheltenham, Maryland =

Unincorporated community in Maryland, United States

Cheltenham
- Unincorporated community
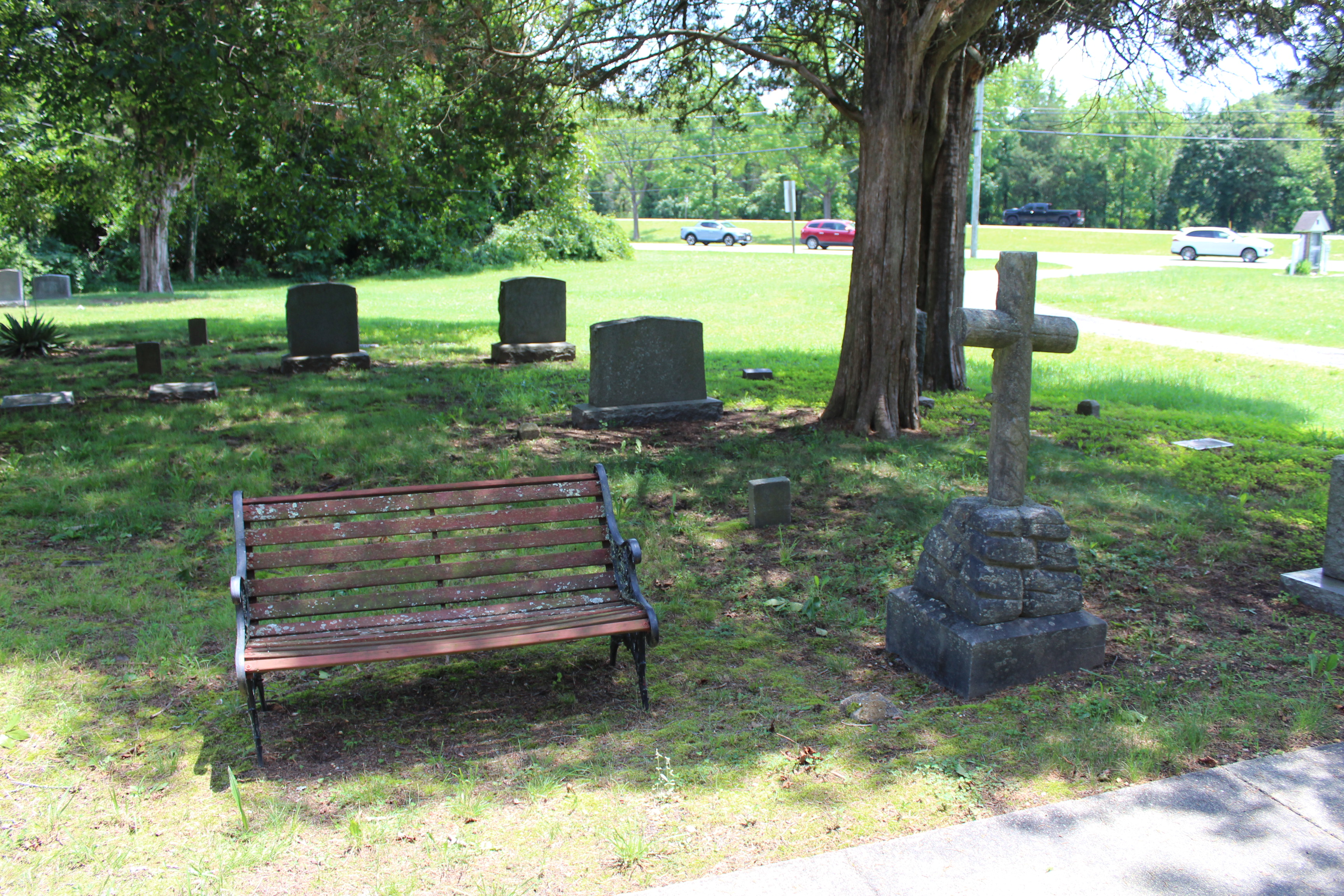
- Cheltenham United Methodist Church Cemetery

- Location in Maryland Cheltenham (the United States)
- Coordinates: 38°44′8″N 76°49′35″W
- Country: United States
- State: Maryland
- County: Prince George's
- Elevation: 190 ft (58 m)
- Time zone: UTC-5 (Eastern (EST))
  - Summer (DST): UTC-4 (EDT)
- ZIP code: 20623
- Area codes: 240 and 301
- GNIS feature ID: 597222

Cheltenham is an unincorporated community in Prince George's County, in southern Maryland, United States, adjacent to U.S. Highway 301. It is named after Cheltenham, Gloucestershire, England.

== History ==
The Cheltenham Youth Detention Center, a juvenile correctional facility, was founded in the 1870s as a "House of Reformation for Colored Children" by Baltimore merchant, banker, and philanthropist Enoch Pratt on his former farm property. Cheltenham is also home to the Southern Maryland Regional Farmers Market, and the Cheltenham State Veterans Cemetery, along with many scenic farms and woods.

== Geography ==
Nearby is the Marlton housing development.
