= Enoch Pratt =

American businessman (1808-1896)

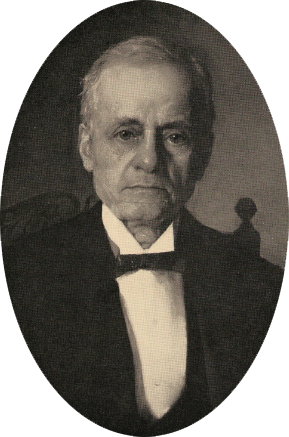
- Born: September 10, 1808; Middleborough, Massachusetts, U.S.
- Died: September 17, 1896 (aged 88); Baltimore, Maryland, U.S.
- Resting place: Green Mount Cemetery
- Occupations: Business magnate, Philanthropist
- Spouse: Maria Louisa Hyde (m. 1837)

Enoch Pratt (September 10, 1808 – September 17, 1896) was an American businessman in Baltimore, Maryland. Pratt was a Unitarian and philanthropist. He is best known for his donations to establish the Enoch Pratt Free Library in Baltimore and expanding the former Sheppard Asylum to become The Sheppard and Enoch Pratt Hospital, located north of the city in western Towson, county seat of Baltimore County. Born and raised in Massachusetts, he moved south to the Chesapeake Bay area and became devoted to the civic interests of the city of Baltimore. He earned his fortune as an owner of business interests beginning in the 1830s originally as a hardware wholesaler, and later expanding into railroads, banking and finance, iron works, and steamship lines and other transportation companies.

== Early life ==
Born in Middleborough, Massachusetts, Enoch Pratt was the second of eight children born to Naomi (née Keith) and Isaac Pratt. A successful businessman, Isaac Pratt managed several businesses, including a sawmill, general store, wholesale hardware. The young Enoch was educated at the former Bridgewater Academy in the neighboring town of Bridgewater, Massachusetts's Town Common. After graduating, at the age of 15, Enoch Pratt began his first job in business as a clerk in a Boston hardware establishment.

In 1831, Pratt moved to Baltimore with US$150 to launch his own wholesale iron hardware business, Enoch Pratt & Brothers at 23-25 South Charles Street, between East Baltimore and German (now Redwood) Streets. The business proved successful, and six years later, Pratt married Maria Louisa Hyde (1818–1913), the daughter of Samuel G. and Catherine Hyde, whom he met at his church, on August 1, 1837. They did not have children.

== Business career ==
With his successful hardware business, Pratt became involved in other businesses as vice president of the Philadelphia, Wilmington and Baltimore Railroad, who built their southern terminal in 1849-1850 at the President Street Station, at President and Fleet Streets, east of the harbor "basin" (today's Inner Harbor). He also served as president of the National Farmers' and Planters' Bank of Baltimore, and was the controlling stockholder in the Maryland Steamboat Company. In 1851, Pratt and his partner invested in western Maryland coal mines and iron yards in the expanding and developing industrial and commercial Baltimore neighborhood of Canton. They made their own merchandise, thereby ending their dependence on northern manufacturers. From 1860 until his death in 1896, he was the president of the National Farmers' and Planters' Bank of Baltimore. Pratt also became president of the Baltimore Clearing House and the Maryland Bankers' Association, in addition to establishing a role in several transportation companies. He was also a director for three other railroads, including the famous Baltimore and Ohio Railroad. He was a contemporary and associate of philanthropist Thomas Kelso. They served together on the board of the Philadelphia, Wilmington and Baltimore Railroad Company.

== Philanthropy ==
During his early years as a businessman, Pratt's philanthropy started with donations to his church, the First Independent Church of Baltimore (later the First Unitarian Church (Unitarian and Universalist), at North Charles and West Franklin Streets, where he served as a trustee for over 40 years. He paid off several of the congregation's large debts, bought a new organ, and financed significant remodeling of the church in the 1890s. Other early philanthropy included his patronage of the artist Edward Sheffield Bartholomew, Pratt commissioned many public sculptures and memorials throughout Baltimore, including the statue of George Washington erected in Druid Hill Park.

Pratt gave much of his time and wealth to Baltimore's cultural and charitable institutions. He served as a trustee of the Peabody Institute. He founded the "House of Reformation and Instruction for Colored Children" which he offered on his former farm property at Cheltenham (in Prince George's County), and the Maryland School for the Deaf and Dumb located at Frederick on South Market Street. In 1865, he donated a free school and public library (The Pratt Free School in 1856, and further endowed upon its 1865 incorporation - which later became a public grammar school preparing students for advancement to the local Middleborough High School, founded 1873), to his hometown of Middleborough in Massachusetts.

He died on September 17, 1896, at his summer residence "Tivoli", a mansion of Italianate style which he bought in 1870, off Woodbourne Avenue in northeast Baltimore. He was buried in Green Mount Cemetery.

=== Enoch Pratt Free Library ===
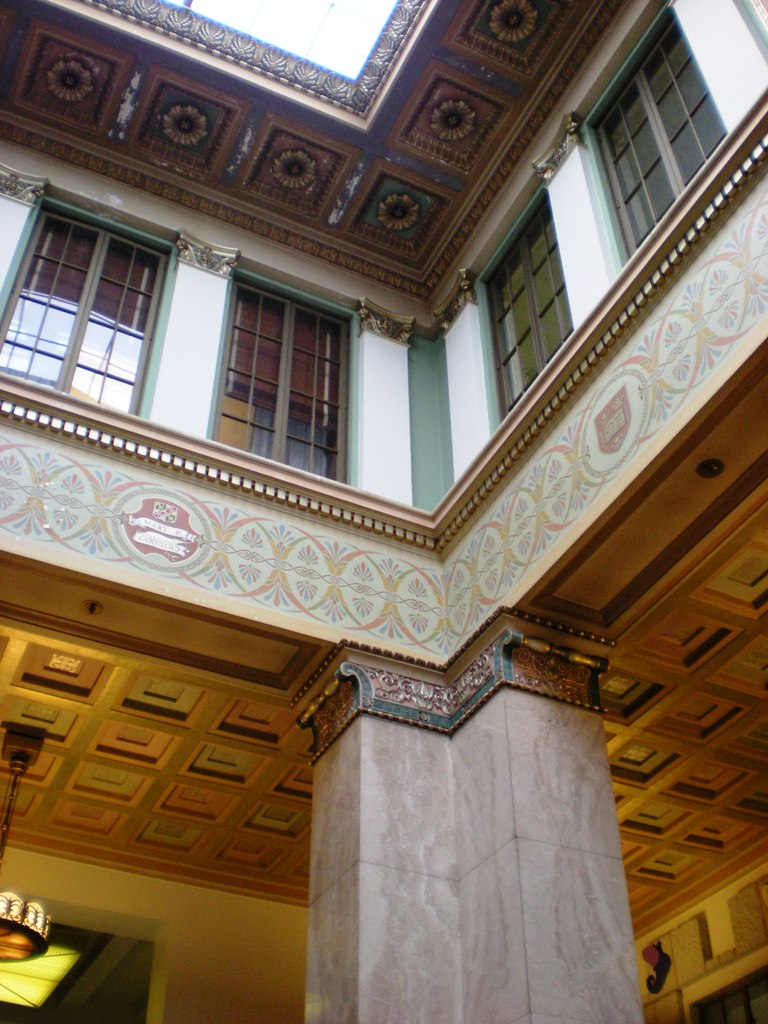
The interior of the Enoch Pratt Free Library

Pratt is best known for his establishment of the Enoch Pratt Free Library in Baltimore. Many residents of the city in late 1881 speculated what was being planned for the excavations going on in the north side of West Mulberry Street, by Cathedral Street, near the old Baltimore Cathedral in the tony Mount Vernon-Belvedere-Mount Royal neighborhood, north of the business district on Cathedral Hill. The mystery was explained when on January 21, 1882, in a letter addressed to the Mayor and City Council of Baltimore, Pratt offered a gift of a central library, four branch libraries (with two additional ones to be constructed shortly thereafter), and a financial endowment of US$1,058,333. Further, he requested that to Mayor William Pinkney Whyte and the City Council continue an annual appropriation to the new library system and support it in the years to come to supplement the interest and benefits accumulating from the principal of his bequest. His intention was to establish a library that "shall be for all, rich and poor without distinction of race or color, who, when properly accredited, can take out the books if they will handle them carefully and return them." The grant was accepted by the municipal government, approved by the General Assembly of Maryland with some enabling legislation, and approved by the city voters later that year in an election/referendum on October 25, 1882. After four years of plans, construction and the hiring of staff with the purchasing of many books, the new library was ready to be opened in January 1886 with some appropriate addresses at ceremonies at the nearby luxurious auditorium of the Academy of Music on North Howard Street (between West Centre and West Franklin Streets), and opened to new patrons and business at the beginning of February 1886.

=== Sheppard Asylum ===
Pratt left the vast majority of his wealth ($2 million of his $2.5 million) to supplement the earlier endowment of The Sheppard and Enoch Pratt Hospital, (as it was later renamed, today it is titled "Sheppard Pratt Health System", giving equal weight to both generous co-founders). Pratt was impressed by the trustees' frugal handling of the 1857 endowment of the original founder, Moses Sheppard. "They are the only Board of Trustees in Baltimore", said Pratt, "who have carried out exactly the directions of the founder". Pratt's bequest was used to complete construction of the old Moses Sheppard Asylum, enlarge the facility to house 200 additional patients at its country campus in western Towson, further north of the city off (North) Charles Street Avenue in suburban Baltimore County, at the old "Mount Airy Farm" of Baltimore merchant Thomas Poultney, which they purchased in 1858 and began construction two years later, however not opening until 1891, trying to remain faithful to the original directions to serve the indigent.

== Enoch Pratt Mansion / Maryland Historical Society ==
Enoch Pratt's city townhouse/mansion located at 201 West Monument Street (southwest corner with Park Avenue in Mount Vernon-Belvedere, purchased in 1847). The Pratt mansion was occupied by his wife Maria Louisa Hyde Pratt until her death in 1913.

In 1919, the West Monument Street townhouse/mansion was gifted to the Historical Society by Mary Washington Keyser, whose husband was a longtime member of the society. A research library, archives, and underground storage stacks were constructed in the following decade at the southern rear of the mansion replacing the former carriage house.

== Legacy ==
Industrialist and philanthropist Andrew Carnegie described Pratt as a pioneer to himself. He praised Pratt's devotion to the free library movement and described him as the "ideal disciple of the gospel of wealth".
