= Urias McGill =

Liberian businessman

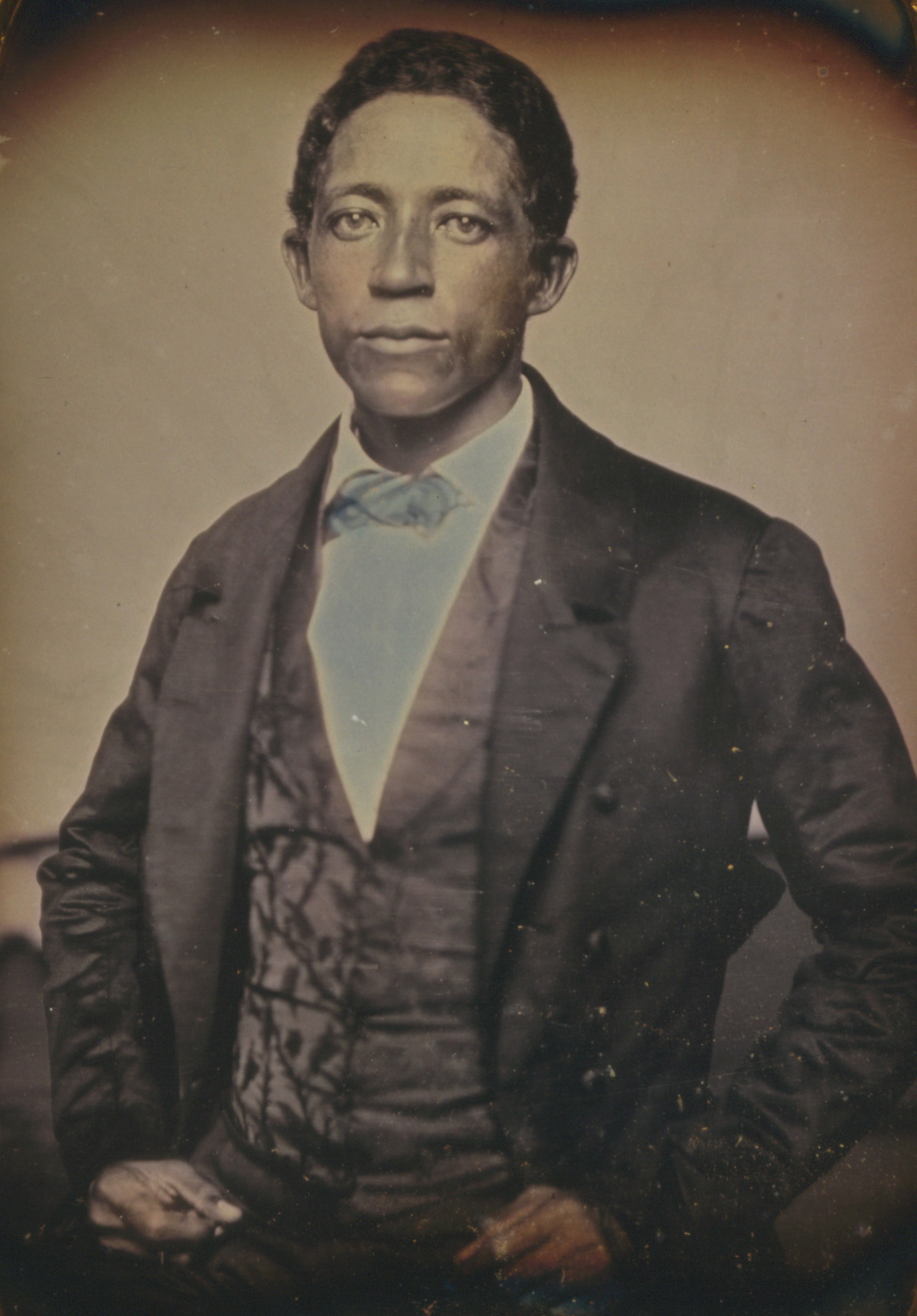
- Portrait of Urias McGill c. 1854
- Born: 1823
- Died: 1866 (aged 42–43)
- Occupation: Businessman

Urias Africanus McGill (c. 1823 – 1866) was an African-American who emigrated with his family to Liberia in the 19th century. He was a member of the well-known McGill family, and he and his brothers established a successful trading business out of Monrovia.

== Biography ==
Urias McGill was born free in Baltimore, Maryland, to George R. and Angelina McGill. When he was eight years old, he and his family emigrated to Liberia aboard the Reaper. His mother died shortly after they arrived in Monrovia in February 1831. In 1854 Urias and his three brothers formed the trading company McGill Brothers.
