= Enoch Pratt Free Library =

Public library system in Baltimore, Maryland, US

- Location: 400 Cathedral Street, (between West Franklin and Mulberry Streets); Baltimore, Maryland
- Type: Free, (Municipal/State) Public Library
- Established: 1882/1886
- Branches: 22

Other information
- Director: Chad Helton, President and CEO
- Website: www.prattlibrary.org

Central Library
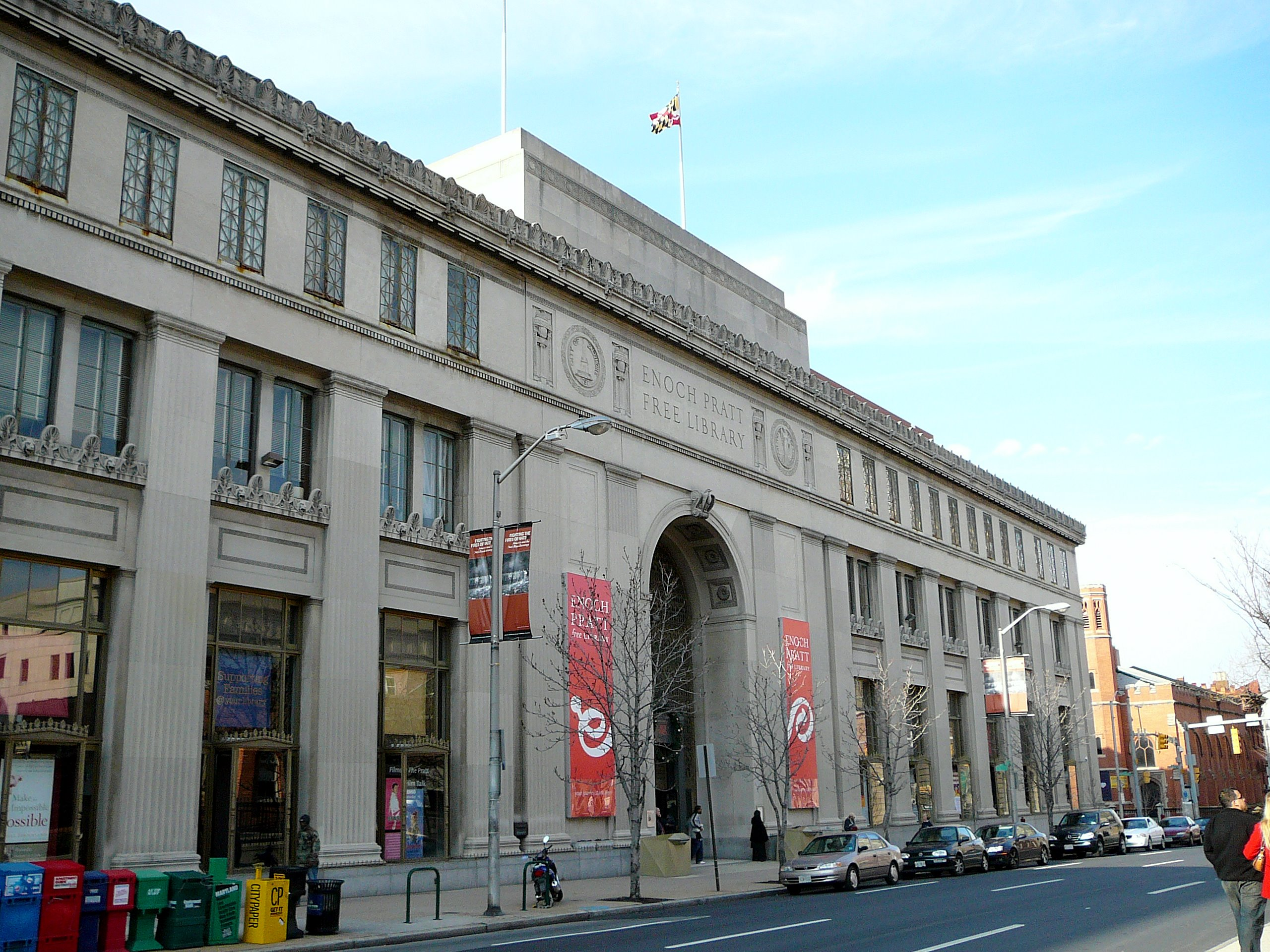
- Enoch Pratt Free Library, Central Library building (second structure - built 1931-1933), Cathedral Street main entrance.
- Interactive map of the Central Library area

General information
- Construction started: 1931
- Construction stopped: 1933

The Enoch Pratt Free Library is the free public library system of Baltimore, Maryland. Its Central Library is located on 400 Cathedral Street (southbound) and occupies the northeastern three quarters of a city block bounded by West Franklin Street (U.S. Route 40 westbound) to the north, Cathedral Street to the east, West Mulberry Street (U.S. Route 40 eastbound) to the south, and Park Avenue (northbound) to the west. Located on historic Cathedral Hill, north of downtown, the library is also in the Mount Vernon-Belvedere-Mount Royal neighborhood and cultural and historic district.

The Cathedral Street Main Library is the flagship of the entire Enoch Pratt Free Library system, which includes twenty-one neighborhood branches, it was designated the "Maryland State Library Resource Center" by the General Assembly of Maryland in 1971. Central Library operates as the state library for Maryland.

== History ==
Library establishment began on January 21, 1882, when the longtime local hardware merchant, banking, and steamship company executive and philanthropist Enoch Pratt (1808–1896) offered a gift of a central library, four branch libraries (with two additional shortly afterward), and a financial endowment of more than $1 million to Mayor William Pinkney Whyte and the Baltimore City Council. His intention was to establish a public circulating library that "shall be for all, rich and poor without distinction of race or color, who, when properly accredited, can take out the books if they will handle them carefully and return them." The grant was soon accepted by the municipal government and approved by the voters in October 1882.

One of the early hires at the library was William A. Williams, the first Black Catholic seminarian in America, who later dropped out due to the prevailing racist attitudes of the day.

In 1886, the Enoch Pratt Free Library system opened not as a single library but as a coordinated system of a central library and four neighborhood branches. The Central Library opened on January 5, 1886, on Mulberry Street in Baltimore, while four branches followed during the next three months. One of these was the Canton Branch, which opened on February 15, 1886, at Ellwood Avenue and O'Donnell Street. Canton was therefore not a separate library system, but one of the original neighborhood branches of the newly established Enoch Pratt Free Library. Pratt had offered Baltimore a central library, four branch libraries, and an endowment of more than $1 million in 1882; the city accepted the gift later that year.

Canton was the first of the four original branches to open, although the Central Library had already opened several weeks earlier. The choice of Canton was particularly significant because the neighborhood already had a tradition of community library services. In 1879, the Workingmen's Institute was established in Canton with a collection of about 1,500 books and subscriptions to more than 100 magazines and newspapers. Enoch Pratt was a trustee of the institute, and later historical accounts have connected his experience there with his interest in extending library services into Baltimore's neighborhoods. The opening of the Canton Branch was therefore part of Pratt's broader plan to combine a central library with neighborhood branches, making free library services accessible to residents throughout Baltimore.

By the end of 1886, the new system consisted of five libraries—the Central Library and four branches. The system's first year demonstrated the scale of the undertaking: the five libraries together held 45,109 volumes, had 25,963 registered borrowers, and recorded 410,215 circulations. The Pratt system thus began as a deliberately organized citywide network rather than as a single central library that was subsequently expanded with branches.

From 1993 to August 2016, Carla Hayden, formerly of the Chicago Public Library, served as the CEO of Enoch Pratt Free Library in Baltimore and since has been the Librarian of Congress in Washington, DC. Hayden and the staff of the Pennsylvania Avenue branch were praised for keeping the branch open in April 2015, after protests and the civil strife over the death of Freddie Gray. The library's location, at the intersection of Pennsylvania and West North Avenues in the northwest center city Sandtown-Winchester community, found itself at the center of the protests drawing nationwide and international attention, giving community members a safe place during the troubled times.

Following Hayden's departure and promotion in August 2016, the acting director of the library was Gordon Krabbe, who served as the library's chief operating officer since 1989.

In July 2017, Heidi Daniel was named the new president and CEO of the public library system. Under Daniel's leadership, the Pratt became one of the first fine-free public library systems on the East Coast. In 2017, the Enoch Pratt Free Library was named one of Reader's Digest and Good Morning America's Nicest Places in America. Daniel helped expand the library's social impact programs, including Social Worker in the Library, Healthcare in the Library, Peer Navigators, and Housing Navigators. Daniel sits on the Board of the Urban Libraries Council. In September 2024, Chad Helton was named as the library system's new president and CEO.

In June 2022, workers across the Pratt Library system voted to form a union named Pratt Workers United with AFSCME Council 67, representing over 300 workers across the system, calling for improved wages, benefits, career advancement, and increased staff input on their work environment. The council would also represent workers at Baltimore Museum of Art and Walters Art Museum if union campaigns at those institutions are successful. Workers within the library system have been organizing for a union since May 2021.

== Central Library building ==
=== Original (1886–2015) ===
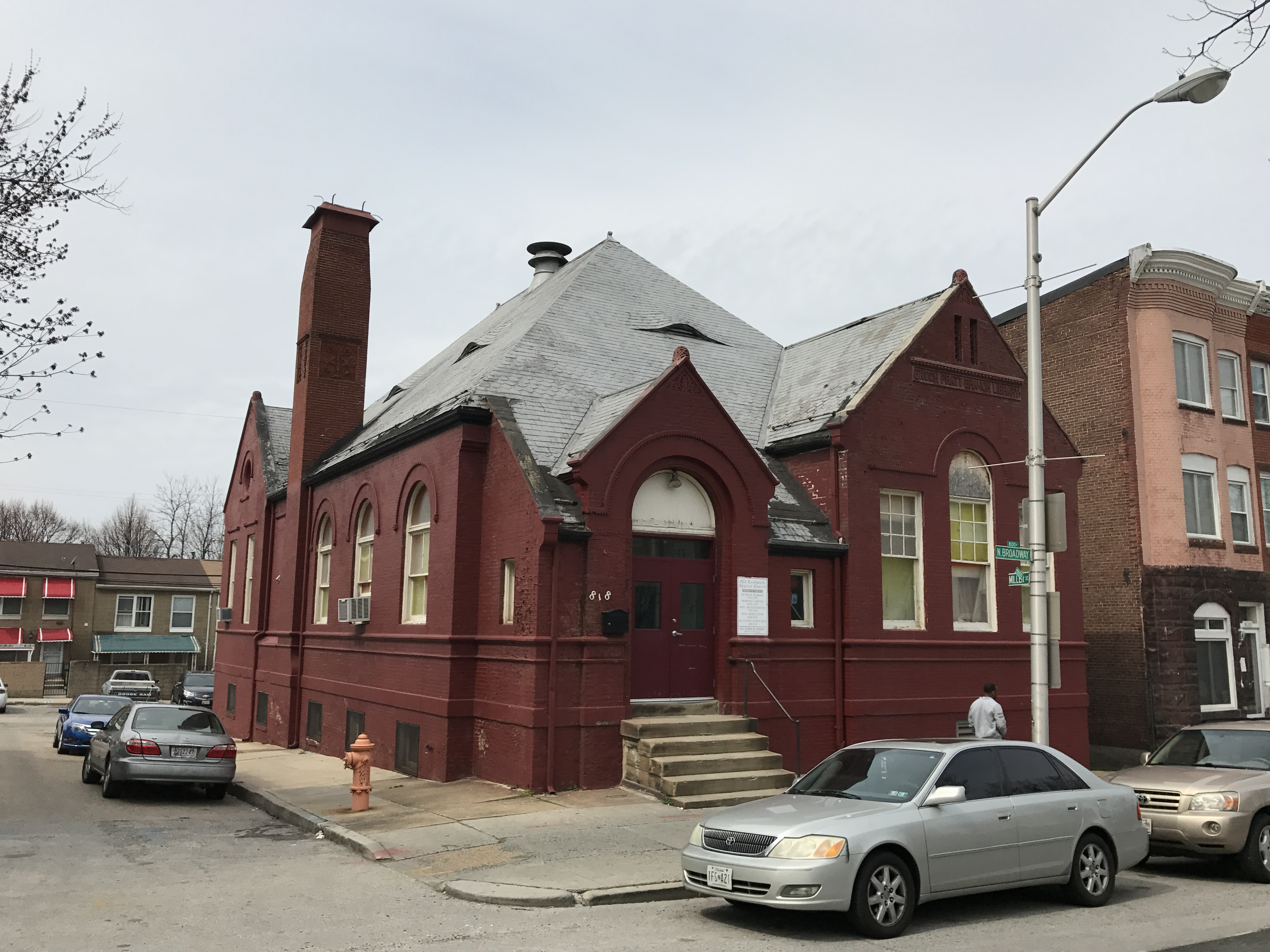
Former branch number 5, now a church.

The merchant and financier Enoch Pratt, in a letter to the Baltimore City Council on January 21, 1882, offered to donate and construct a free public library with several neighborhood branches open to all the citizens of the City of Baltimore, and its surrounding environs. After some debate and discussion which was widely reported in the local newspapers, the mayor and council accepted the gift and the terms of its conditions later that year, which were approved by the citizens in a referendum held during an election that October, 1882.

Pratt's donation consisted of $250,000 for land and building for the central library; $50,000 for land and building for four branch libraries; and $833,333 in cash for an endowment whose estimated annual return of $50,000, he anticipated, would finance expenses for management of the library system.

Construction of the Central Library began 1882. It opened on January 5, 1886. The first four branches also opened in 1886. Subsequently, Pratt gave funds for the construction of two more branches; one opened 1888 and the other in 1896. In 1899, Robert Poole, a Baltimore industrialist, built and gave to the City of Baltimore, a seventh branch located in Hampden. In 1905, steel-maker and philanthropist Andrew Carnegie gave $500,000 for the construction of twenty more branches. Because of closings, relocations, and reallocation of space, the Pratt system now has twenty-two active branches.

Designed by Charles L. Carson, "Old Central" occupied a fraction of the same plot of land as its successor 47 years later, facing West Mulberry Street near the corner of Cathedral Street. The structure's elaborate Romanesque Revival architecture became a target of criticism from journalists during final years of existence: H. L. Mencken of The Baltimore Sun, a frequent and prolific user of the branch at Calhoun and Hollins Streets, judged it "so infernally hideous that it ought to be pulled down by the common hangman".

=== Current ===
By the late 1920s, Old Central could no longer hold the library's continually expanding collection, even though an annex had been added at the rear. Baltimore City voters approved a loan for $3 million by an almost 3-to-1 margin on May 3, 1927. The Central Pratt Library's staff, services and 400,000 volumes were relocated to temporary quarters at the old Rouse-Hempstone Building at West Redwood Street and Hopkins Place (now the site of the Royal Farms Arena) for a two-year stay during 1931–1933. At this temporary location, the Central Pratt was able to reorganize and plan for its future arrangements of departments and try out its soon-to-be famous "department store windows" displays It was razed in 1931, along with several townhouses facing Cathedral Street, including a significant one formerly owned by Robert Goodloe Harper.

The replacement structure occupies the entire block facing the Old Baltimore Cathedral. Construction began in June 1931, during the darkest, most difficult days of the financial Great Depression and along with other major construction projects occurring at that time with the building of a new U.S. Courthouse and Post Office at Battle Monument Square at North Calvert and East Lexington-Fayette Streets, and the new Municipal Office Building on Holliday Street, across from the old Baltimore City Hall and the new Federal Courthouse/Post Office, offered an important source of desperately needed employment to the hundreds of out-of-work citizens of the city.

The architects were C. and N. Friz, with consulting architects Tilton & Githens from New York. The building was completed in January 1933, and opened to the public on February 3, with a record of not one day of suspended service since the original beginnings of "Enoch Pratt's Folly" on January 5, 1886. In Spring of 2016, ground was broken on a $115 million restoration of the historic Central Library. The building remained open to the public. February 11–19, the Central Library closed to the public to relocate departments to the newly renovated upper floors, and to begin renovation of the lower levels. The restoration was completed in Fall of 2019. A Grand Reopening block party drew a crowd of 9,000 people.

In 2020, the Senator Barbara A. Mikulski Room, with mementos and Mikulski's Presidential Medal of Freedom, was opened in the Central Library.

=== Maryland Department ===
The Maryland Department, located on the second floor of the 2004 Annex, contains many of the library's prized collections. These include 275,000 mounted documents (mostly newspaper articles), 2100 maps, 6000 pieces of ephemera, and 24,000 photographs, all relevant to Maryland and Maryland history. The Maryland Department also has a room full of books pertaining to Maryland, with an emphasis on Baltimore.

Most materials in the Maryland Department are non-circulating but available for patrons to examine.

== Statistics ==
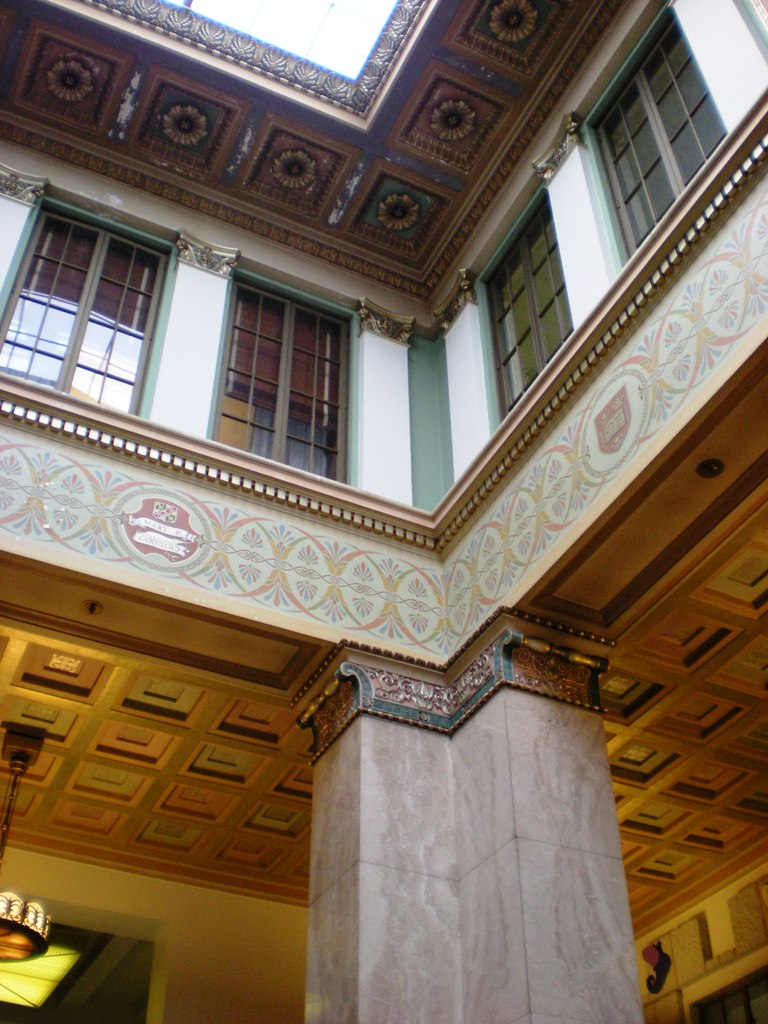
Central Hall, Central Library building.

In 2024, The Pratt Library hit a 13-year high for circulation and all-time high for active cardholders. The summer reading program, Summer Break Baltimore also hit a record high with more than 23,000 participants across the city.

== Branches ==
The Enoch Pratt Free Library operates the Central Library and 22 neighborhood branches throughout Baltimore City, supplemented by mobile and outreach services. The branch system developed from four neighborhood branches established shortly after the Central Library opened in 1886, and has expanded and evolved through successive periods of construction, relocation, and replacement.

- Brooklyn — opened in 1921 in the Brooklyn neighborhood; the original building was replaced in 1965.
- Canton — opened in 1886 in the Canton neighborhood and is one of the original Pratt branches.
- Central Library — opened in 1886 in the Mount Vernon neighborhood and serves as the main library of the Pratt system.
- Cherry Hill — serves the Cherry Hill neighborhood and surrounding communities.
- Clifton — opened in 1916 in the Clifton neighborhood.
- Edmondson Avenue — opened in 1952 in the Edmondson Village area after local residents campaigned for a permanent branch.
- Forest Park — opened in 1910 in the Forest Park area and continues to serve Northwest Baltimore.
- Govans — opened in 1921 in the Govans neighborhood and continues to operate at the same location.
- Hamilton — opened in 1920 in the Hamilton neighborhood; a larger replacement building opened in 1959.
- Hampden — opened in 1900 in the Hampden neighborhood.
- Herring Run — opened in 1963 in the Herring Run area of Northeast Baltimore.
- Johnston Square — opened in 2025 in the Johnston Square neighborhood of East Baltimore.
- Light Street — opened in 1886 and serves the Federal Hill, Locust Point, and Otterbein areas.
- Northwood — dedicated in 1960 and serves communities in Northeast Baltimore, including Northwood and surrounding neighborhoods.
- Orleans Street — traces its history to the Broadway branch, opened in 1888; the branch was relocated to its present location and renamed Orleans Street in 2007.
- Patterson Park — opened in 1910 in the Patterson Park area and remains in operation.
- Pennsylvania Avenue — opened in 1953 in its present form; it succeeded the earlier Easterwood branch, which opened in 1914.
- Reisterstown Road — opened in 1967 and serves Northwest Baltimore along the Reisterstown Road corridor.
- Roland Park — opened in 1924 in the Roland Park neighborhood.
- Southeast Anchor — opened in 2007 in Southeast Baltimore and was the first new library construction in Baltimore in more than 30 years.
- Walbrook — began serving the Walbrook community in 1903 and moved into a permanent branch building in 1907; the present building opened in 1957.
- Washington Village — serves the Washington Village (Pigtown) area of Southwest Baltimore.
- Waverly — originated as the Homestead branch, opened in 1911; it was relocated and renamed the Waverly branch in 1971.

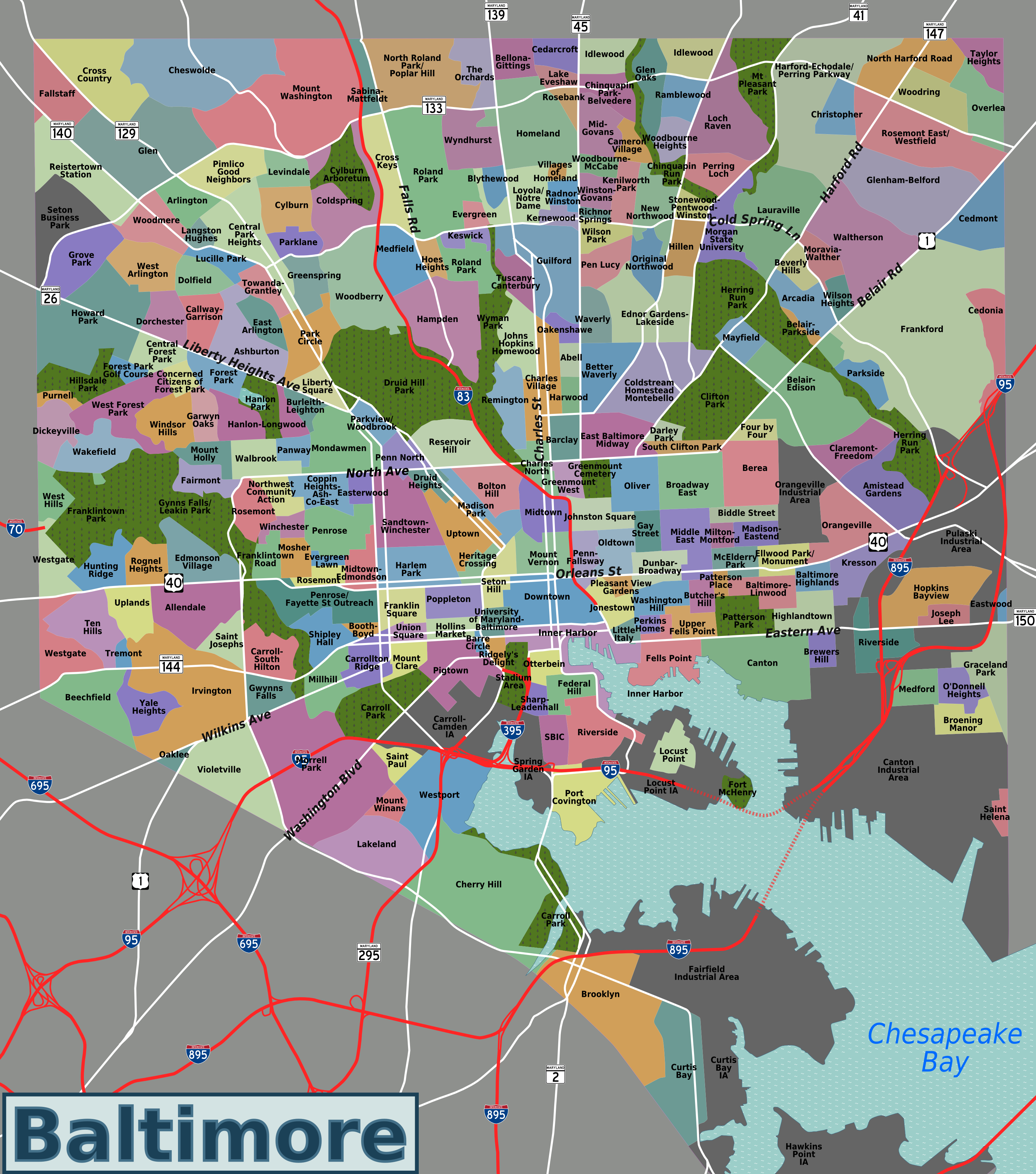
Map of Baltimore's neighborhoods.

== See also ==
- Edgar Allan Poe
- George Peabody Library
