= List of people from Baltimore =

This is a list of notable people who were born in or lived in Baltimore, Maryland.

== A ==
- Horace Abbott (1806–1887), born in Sudbury, Massachusetts, moved to Baltimore in 1836, iron manufacturer, supplied the armor for USS Monitor
- Arunah Shepherdson Abell (1806–1888), born in East Providence, Rhode Island, founder of the Baltimore Sun
- David T. Abercrombie (1867–1931), born in and raised in Baltimore, founder of Abercrombie & Fitch
- Don Abney (1923–2000), jazz pianist
- Rosalie Silber Abrams (1916–2009), first female and Jewish majority leader in Maryland State Senate
- Brendan Adams (born 2000), basketball player in the Israeli Basketball Premier League
- Henry Adams (1858–1929), prominent mechanical engineer, co-founder of ASHVE; born in Germany, died in Baltimore
- Otto Eugene Adams (1889–1968), architect
- Charles Adler Jr. (1899–1980), inventor
- Larry Adler (1914–2001), harmonica player
- Spiro Agnew (1918–1996), born in Baltimore; governor of Maryland 1967–1969 and vice president of the United States 1969–1973
- Felix Agnus (1839–1925), Union Army general, editor and publisher of Baltimore American newspaper, buried under Black Aggie
- John W. Albaugh (1837–1909), actor
- Franklin A. Alberger (1825–1877), mayor of Buffalo, New York
- Al Albert (born 1949), college soccer coach and president of United Soccer Coaches
- William Albert (1816–1879), U.S. representative, born in Baltimore
- Grant Aleksander (born 1959), actor
- John Aler (1949–2022), lyric tenor
- Hattie Alexander (1901–1968), pediatrician and microbiologist
- Robert Alexander (1863–1941), World War I general, commander of 77th Infantry Division
- All Time Low, pop punk band formed in Baltimore by Jack Barakat, Rian Dawson, Alex Gaskarth, and Zack Merrick
- Devin Allen, photographer and photojournalist
- Yari Allnutt (born 1970), soccer player who played for the United States national team
- Cecilia Altonaga (born 1962), judge of United States District Court for the Southern District of Florida
- Rafael Alvarez (born 1958), journalist
- John Patrick Amedori (born 1987), actor
- Adrian Amos (born 1993), safety for the Green Bay Packers
- Tori Amos (born 1963), born in North Carolina, grew up in Baltimore; singer, songwriter and pianist
- William H. Amoss (1936–1997), politician, former Maryland state senator
- Tom Amrhein (1911–1987), soccer player who played for the United States national team
- Charles W. Anderson (1844–1916), awarded Medal of Honor
- Curt Anderson (born 1949), politician, broadcast journalist, member of Maryland House of Delegates
- Mignon Anderson (1892–1983), silent film actress
- Richard Snowden Andrews (1830–1903), architect, Confederate officer
- Peter Angelos (1929–2024), born in Pittsburgh, attorney, former owner of the Baltimore Orioles
- Carmelo Anthony (born 1984), born in New York, grew up in Baltimore; professional basketball player formerly for the Oklahoma City Thunder, New York Knicks, Denver Nuggets, and Houston Rockets
- George Armistead (1780–1818), born in Virginia, commander of Fort McHenry during the Battle of Baltimore
- Lewis Addison Armistead (1817–1863), born in North Carolina, Confederate general mortally wounded at Gettysburg, buried in Baltimore
- Annie Armstrong (1850–1938), Baptist missionary
- Bess Armstrong (born 1953), actress
- John S. Arnick (1933–2006), politician, former member of the Maryland House of Delegates
- Howard Ashman (1950–1991), Academy Award-winning lyricist (The Little Mermaid, Beauty and the Beast, Little Shop of Horrors)
- Sonny Askew (born 1957), soccer player and coach who played for the United States national team
- John Astin (born 1930), TV and film actor, Gomez Addams on The Addams Family television series
- Lisa Aukland (born 1957), professional bodybuilder and powerlifter
- Robert Austrian (1916–2007), physician, medical researcher, winner of Albert Lasker Clinical Medical Research Award
- Tavon Austin (born 1991), wide receiver for Dallas Cowboys
- Flo Ayres (1923–2022), nationally known radio actress
- Leah Ayres (born 1957), actress

== B ==
- David Bachrach (1845–1921), lived in Baltimore, photographer, took only known photo of Lincoln giving the Gettysburg Address; uncle to Gertrude Stein
- Penn Badgley (born 1986), born in Baltimore, actor, Dan Humphrey from Gossip Girl
- Orlando Bagwell (born 1951), film director
- Robert Lewis Baker (1937–1979), after whom Robert Baker Park is named, Federal Hill
- Russell Baker (1925–2019), raised in Baltimore, writer, political columnist for The New York Times
- Virginia S. Baker (1921–1998), nicknamed "Baltimore's First Lady of Fun", the Patterson Park Recreation Center in Baltimore is named in her honor
- F. Clever Bald (1897–1970), historian and professor
- Florence E. Bamberger (1882–1965), pedagogue, school supervisor, and progressive education advocate
- Louis Bamberger (1855–1944), businessman, department store owner, and philanthropist
- Lloyd Banks (born 1982), rapper born in Baltimore and raised in Queens, New York
- Margaret Barker (1908–1992), actress, director, producer, educator, and playwright
- Jasmine Arielle Barnes (born 1991), composer, vocalist, and educator
- Joshua Barney (1759–1818), commodore in U.S. Navy
- Christian Barreiro (born 1990), soccer player
- John Barth (1930–2024), author
- Gary Bartz (born 1940), jazz saxophonist
- Bernadette Bascom (born 1962), R&B singer
- Robbie Basho (1940–1986), guitarist and singer
- Isaac Rieman Baxley (1850–1920), poet
- Sylvia Beach (1887–1962), owned Shakespeare and Company, key bookstore for expatriates in Paris
- Madison Smartt Bell (born 1957), novelist and professor at Goucher College
- Ben Bender (born 2001), soccer player
- Jacob Beser (1921–1992), only person to crew both atomic bomb missions in World War II
- Caleb Biggers (born 1999), American football player
- Eubie Blake (1887–1983), composer of ragtime, jazz and popular music
- Shelly Blake-Plock (born 1974), entrepreneur and musician
- Nili Block (born 1995), Israeli world champion kickboxer and Muay Thai fighter
- Clarence W. Blount (1921–2003), Maryland State Senate
- A. Aubrey Bodine (1906–1970), photojournalist for The Baltimore Sun
- Tyrone "Muggsy" Bogues (born 1965), professional basketball player
- John R. Bolton (born 1948), National Security advisor of the United States, former U.S. ambassador to the United Nations
- Charles Joseph Bonaparte (1851–1921), U.S. attorney general, secretary of the Navy, relative of Napoleon
- Keith Booth (born 1974), Maryland Terrapins assistant coach, former Chicago Bulls player
- William S. Booze (1862–1933), former U.S. congressman for Maryland's 3rd District
- John Borozzi (born 1954), soccer player, coach, and executive
- Julie Bowen (Julie Bowen Luetkemeyer; born 1970), film and TV actress, star of Modern Family
- Andrew J. Boyle (1911–2001), U.S. Army lieutenant general
- Ryan Boyle (born 1981), MLL and NLL lacrosse player, graduate of the Gilman School
- Cora Belle Brewster (1859–1937), physician, surgeon, medical writer, editor
- Flora A. Brewster (1852–1919), Baltimore's first women surgeon
- Margaret Sutton Briscoe (1864–1941), short story writer
- Conrad Brooks (1931–2017), B movie actor
- Buster Brown (1913–2002), tap dancer
- George William Brown (1812–1890), mayor of Baltimore during the Pratt Street Riot
- Rosey Brown (1932–2004), football star for New York Giants; member of Pro Football Hall of Fame; attended Morgan State University in Baltimore
- James M. Buchanan (1803–1876), judge and U.S. ambassador to Denmark
- Robert C. Buchanan (1811–1878), Union army general
- Tony Bunn (born 1957), jazz bassist, composer, producer
- Elise Burgin (born 1962), tennis player
- Elizabeth Burmaster (born 1954), superintendent of public instruction of Wisconsin
- Beverly Lynn Burns (born 1949), became first woman Boeing 747 airline captain on July 18, 1984
- Ed Burns (born 1946), screenwriter and former homicide and narcotics police detective
- David Byrne (born 1952), songwriter for new wave band Talking Heads, grew up in Baltimore County

== C ==
- Cab Calloway (1907–1994), jazz singer and bandleader, raised in Baltimore
- Cecil Calvert, 2nd Baron Baltimore (1605–1675), proprietary governor
- Leonard Calvert (1606–1647), first governor of Province of Maryland
- Josh Campbell (born 1978), soccer player
- Nick Campofreda (1914–1959), NFL player
- Ben Cardin (born 1943), U.S. senator and U.S. representative from Maryland
- Meyer Cardin (1907–2005), Democratic state delegate (1936–38), former judge, Baltimore City Supreme Bench
- Pete Caringi Jr. (born 1955), soccer player and coach
- Bub Carrington (born 2005), NBA player
- John Carroll (1735–1815), first Roman Catholic archbishop in U.S.
- Ben Carson (born 1951), born and raised in Detroit, Michigan; U.S. secretary of housing and urban development; noted neurosurgeon at Johns Hopkins Hospital
- Hetty Cary (1836–1892), maker of one of first three battle flags of the Confederacy
- Sam Cassell (born 1969), professional basketball player and coach
- Brett Cecil (born 1986), Major League Baseball pitcher for the St. Louis Cardinals
- Rome Cee (born 1982), rapper
- Dennis Chambers (born 1959), drummer (P-Funk All Stars, Steely Dan)
- Norman "Chubby" Chaney (1914–1936), short-lived child actor, Our Gang
- Josh Charles (born 1971), actor, Sports Night, The Good Wife, Dead Poets Society
- Charley Chase (Charles Joseph Parrott; 1893–1940), silent and sound film comedian, director
- Samuel Chase (1741–1811), signer of Declaration of Independence and US Supreme Court judge
- Jim Cherneski (born 1974), soccer player, coach, and inventor
- Robert F. Chew (1960–2013), actor, The Wire
- John Christ (born 1965), rock musician, Danzig classic lineup guitarist
- Tom Clancy (1947–2013), author of The Hunt for Red October and many other novels, several of which were made into motion pictures
- Jace Clark (born 2005), soccer player
- Martha Clarke (born 1944), modern choreographer
- Mary Pat Clarke (1941–2024), Baltimore City Council
- Kevin Clash (born 1960), puppeteer best known for portrayal of Elmo on Sesame Street
- Charles Pearce Coady (1868–1934), U.S. congressman (D) for Maryland's 3rd District, 1913–1921
- Ta-Nehisi Coates (born 1975), MacArthur Fellow and National Book Award winning author of Between the World and Me
- Andy Cohen (1904–1988), Major League Baseball second baseman and coach
- Claribel Cone (1864–1929), with sister Etta, collected art of Matisse, Picasso, and Van Gogh
- Hans Conried (1917–1982), comic character actor and voice actor
- Keandre Cook (born 1997), basketball player for Hapoel Tel Aviv in the Israeli Basketball Premier League
- Kenny Cooper (born 1984), soccer player who represented the United States national team
- Miriam Cooper (1891–1976), silent film actress, co-starred in The Birth of a Nation
- Martha Coston (1826–1904), inventor and businesswoman
- Thomas Cromwell Corner (1865–1938), portrait artist
- Elijah E. Cummings (1951–2019), U.S. congressman (D) for Maryland's 7th District
- Ida R. Cummings (1867–1958), Baltimore's first black kindergarten teacher
- Mary C. Curtis (born 1953), journalist
- Harvey Cushing (1869–1939), pioneer neurosurgeon at Johns Hopkins Hospital

== D ==
- Thomas D'Alesandro Jr. (1903–1987), mayor of Baltimore, U.S. representative, father of Nancy Pelosi
- Bob Dalsemer (born 1943), square and contra dance writer and caller
- Brian Dannelly, director (Saved!, Weeds, United States of Tara)
- Clay Davenport, sabermetrician and computer programmer for NOAA
- Charles William Davis (born 1947), rapist and serial killer
- Gervonta Davis (born 1994), boxer
- Henrietta Vinton Davis (1860–1941), elocutionist, dramatist, and impersonator
- Angela Dawson, community activist murdered at age 36 along with her family in 2002
- Dan Deacon (born 1981), electronic musician
- Buddy Deane (1924–2003), disc jockey, host of TV dance show that inspired the movie Hairspray
- William deBuys (born 1949), author and conservationist
- Olive Dennis (1885–1957), railroad engineer
- Divine (1945–1988), drag queen persona of Glen Milstead, actor and singer
- Juan Dixon (born 1978), basketball player at University of Maryland, College Park and pro ranks
- Sheila Dixon (born 1951), first female mayor of Baltimore
- Stephen Dixon (1936–2019), author
- Mary Dobkin (1902–1987), baseball coach
- Fitzhugh Dodson (1923–1993), clinical psychologist, lecturer, educator and author
- John Doe (born 1953), guitarist for the band X
- James Lowry Donaldson (1814–1885), Union army general
- Henry Grattan Donnelly (1850–1931), author and playwright
- Art Donovan (1924–2013), Baltimore Colts, Pro Football Hall of Famer
- Joey Dorsey (born 1983), professional basketball player for the Houston Rockets
- Frederick Douglass (1818–1895), abolitionist, statesman, orator, editor, author, prominent figure in African-American history
- Ronnie Dove (born 1935), pop and country singer who had a string of 21 Billboard hits from 1964 to 1969
- Dru Hill, R&B singing group
- W.E.B. Du Bois (1868–1963), founder of the NAACP, lived in Baltimore 1939–1950
- Mildred Dunnock (1901–1991), Oscar-nominated theater, film and television actress
- Ferdinand Durang (c. 1785–1831), actor, best known as the first person to sing publicly Francis Scott Key's "The Star-Spangled Banner"
- Adam Duritz (born 1964), singer with Counting Crows
- Charles S. Dutton (born 1951), actor

== E ==
- Joni Eareckson Tada (born 1949), Christian author and singer
- Charles K. Edmunds (1876–1949), president of Lingnan University and Pomona College
- Tyde-Courtney Edwards (born 1987), dancer and businesswoman
- Robert Ehrlich (born 1957), former U.S. congressman, 60th governor of Maryland
- Milton S. Eisenhower (1899–1985), president of Johns Hopkins University 1956–1967
- Louis E. Eliasberg (1896–1976), financier and numismatist known for assembling the only complete collection of U.S. coins ever
- Cass Elliot (1941–1974), born Ellen Naomi Cohen, singer, member of The Mamas & the Papas
- Donald B. Elliott (born 1931), member of Maryland House of Delegates
- James Ellsworth (born 1984), professional wrestler
- Joan Erbe (1926–2014), painter and sculptor
- Cal Ermer (1923–2008), Minnesota Twins manager
- Ellery Eskelin (born 1959), jazz saxophonist, raised in Baltimore
- Helen Essary (1886–1951), Baltimore Sun reporter and syndicated columnist in Washington, born and raised in Baltimore
- Shinah Solomon Etting (1744–1822), matriarch of one of Baltimore's first Jewish families
- Solomon Etting (1764–1847), merchant and politician
- Damon Evans (born 1949), actor best known as the second to portray Lionel Jefferson on the CBS sitcom The Jeffersons
- Tony Evans (born 1949), pastor of Oak Cliff Bible Fellowship

== F ==
- Diane Fanning, true crime author and novelist
- Anna Faris (born 1976), actress, notably for Scary Movie, born but not raised in Baltimore
- Lois Feinblatt (1921–2022), sex therapist
- Nathaniel Fick (born 1977), U.S. Marine captain, author, and technology executive
- Walter Fillmore (1933–2017), U.S. brigadier general, United States Marine Corps
- Steven Fischer (born 1972), film producer, two-time Emmy Award nominee, raised in northeast Baltimore
- Ray Fisher (born 1987), actor, notably for Justice League
- George Fisher (born 1970), vocalist for death metal band Cannibal Corpse
- F. Scott Fitzgerald (1896–1940), author; lived late in life in Baltimore, buried in Rockville
- Paul Ford (1901–1976), actor, notably for The Phil Silvers Show and The Music Man
- Edward R. Foreman (1808–1885), meteorologist
- Jane Frank (1918–1986), abstract expressionist artist, painter, sculptor, mixed media and textile artist, pupil of Hans Hofmann
- Gertrude Franklin (1858–1913), singer and music educator
- George A Frederick (1842–1924), architect of Baltimore City Hall
- Alex Freeman (born 2004), soccer player who represented the United States national team
- Antonio Freeman (born 1972), football wide receiver, most notably for Green Bay Packers
- Mona Freeman (1926–2014), actress, notably for Black Beauty in 1946
- William H. French (1815–1881), Union army general
- John Friedberg (born 1961), Olympic fencer
- Paul Friedberg (born 1959), Olympic fencer
- Bill Frisell (born 1951), jazz guitarist and composer

== G ==
- Joe Gans (1874–1910), lightweight boxing champion
- John Work Garrett (1820–1884), banker, philanthropist, and president of the Baltimore and Ohio Railroad (B&O)
- Mary Garrett (1854–1915), suffragist and philanthropist
- Alex Gaskarth (born 1987), singer for rock band All Time Low
- Lee Gatch (1902–1968), abstract artist
- Rudy Gay (born 1986), basketball player for University of Connecticut and NBA's Memphis Grizzlies, Sacramento Kings, Toronto Raptors, and San Antonio Spurs
- Herb Gerwig (1931–2011), professional wrestler of the 1960s and 1970s known as Killer Karl Kox
- James Gibbons (1834–1921), cardinal, 9th Roman Catholic Archbishop of Baltimore
- Garretson W. Gibson (1832–1910), president of Liberia 1900–1904
- Horatio Gates Gibson (1827–1924), Union Army general
- Adam Gidwitz (born 1982), children's book author
- Brian David Gilbert (born 1994), comedian
- Duane Gill (born 1953), former WWE wrestler (as Gillberg) who resides in Severn, Maryland
- Anita Gillette (born 1936), actress and game show personality
- Dondre Gilliam (born 1977), football player
- Ira Glass (born 1959), radio personality; host of This American Life, distributed by Public Radio International; cousin of Philip Glass
- Philip Glass (born 1937), minimalist composer
- Jacob Glushakow (1914–2000), painter
- Duff Goldman (born 1974), food artist, cake baker, television personality
- Minna Gombell (1892–1973), stage and film actress
- Tamir Goodman (born 1982), basketball player
- Jaimy Gordon (born 1944), author, winner of National Book Award for Fiction
- Shan Goshorn (1957–2018), artist
- Brian Gottfried (born 1952), tennis player, reached No. 3 in the world in 1977
- Elmer Greensfelder (1892–1966), playwright
- George Griffin (1849–1897), freed slave and confidant of Mark Twain

== H ==
- Virginia Hall (1906–1982), OSS agent
- Stavros Halkias (born 1989), stand-up comedian, writer, actor, and podcaster
- Edith Hamilton (1867–1963), "the greatest woman classicist"
- Elaine Hamilton-O'Neal (1920–2010), artist, born in Catonsville near Baltimore; graduated from Baltimore's Maryland Institute College of Art
- Louis Hamman (1877–1946), physician and namesake of Hamman's sign, Hamman's syndrome and Hamman-Rich syndrome
- Mary Hamman (1907–1984), writer and editor, daughter of Louis Hamman
- Dashiell Hammett (1894–1961), detective writer of Maltese Falcon, born in Maryland and worked as a detective in Baltimore
- Steve Handelsman (born 1948), journalist
- Frances Harper (1825–1911), abolitionist leader
- Elaine D. Harmon (1919–2015), aviator
- Ken Harris (1963–2008), city councilman
- Kyle Harrison (born 1983), lacrosse player
- David Hasselhoff (born 1952), actor
- Marcus Hatten (born 1980), basketball player
- Moshe Hauer (d. 2025), Orthodox rabbi
- Emily Spencer Hayden (1869–1949), photographer
- Raymond V. Haysbert (1920–2010), business executive and civil rights leader
- Maya Hayuk (born 1969), fine artist and muralist
- Mo'Nique Hicks (born 1967), comedian, television and film actress from Woodlawn, Maryland
- Alger Hiss (1904–1996), State Department official, accused of being a Soviet spy and convicted of perjury
- Henry Hochheimer (1818–1912), rabbi
- Katie Hoff (born 1989), Olympic medalist swimmer and multiple World Aquatics Championships gold medalist; lives in Baltimore
- Billie Holiday (1915–1959), born Eleanora Fagan Gough, jazz singer
- Sidney Hollander (1881–1972), humanitarian and civil and political rights activist
- Ella Virginia Houck Holloway (1862–1940), American socialite, clubwoman, anti-communist, and anti-suffragist
- Henry Holt (1840–1926), publisher, founded Henry Holt & Company in 1873
- Johns Hopkins (1795–1873), Quaker businessman, abolitionist and philanthropist whose bequest established Johns Hopkins University
- John Eager Howard (1752–1827), soldier, governor of Maryland, namesake of Howard County, Maryland
- William Henry Howell (1860–1945), physiologist who pioneered the use of heparin as a blood anti-coagulant
- Christopher Hughes (1786–1849), diplomat
- Sarah T. Hughes (1896–1985), federal judge who swore in Lyndon B. Johnson aboard Air Force One after the Kennedy assassination

== I ==
- Joseph Iglehart (1891–1979), financier
- Moses Ingram (born 1994), actress

== J ==
- Lillie Mae Carroll Jackson (1889–1975), pioneer civil rights activist, organizer of Baltimore branch of NAACP
- Debbie Jacobs (born 1955), singer
- Thomas Jane (born 1969), actor
- Harry Jeffra (1914–1988), professional boxer, world bantamweight champion
- Ariell Johnson (born 1983), business owner
- Bryant Johnson (born 1981), professional football player with San Francisco 49ers
- Delano Johnson (born 1988), football player
- Natalie Joy Johnson (born 1978), film and stage actress, singer and dancer
- Brionna Jones (born 1995), WNBA power forward
- Cyrus Jones (born 1993), former professional football player
- LaKisha Jones (born 1980), singer
- Thomas David Jones (born 1955), astronaut with doctorate in planetary science
- Brian Jordan (born 1967), Major League Baseball player, briefly a pro footballer
- Jerome H. Joyce (1865–1924), president of Aero Club of Baltimore
- JPEGMafia (born 1989), music producer, experimental hip hop artist

== K ==
- K-Swift (1978–2008), born Khia Edgerton, club/radio DJ, producer, radio personality at WERQ
- David Kairys (born 1943), professor of Law at Temple University School of Law
- Al Kaline (1934–2020), Major League Baseball player for Detroit Tigers; Hall of Famer, never played in minor leagues
- Camara Kambon (born 1973), film composer, songwriter, music producer, pianist
- John Kassir (born 1957), actor, voice of Crypt Keeper in TV's Tales from the Crypt
- David Katz (1993–2018), Jacksonville Landing shooter
- Chris Keating (born 1982), lead singer and songwriter for band Yeasayer
- William Henry Keeler (1931–2017), Archbishop Emeritus of Baltimore and Cardinal of Roman Catholic Church
- Stacy Keibler (born 1979), actress, former professional wrestler for WWE
- Thomas Kelso (Ireland 1784–1878), wealthy merchant, founder of Kelso Home, philanthropist
- John Pendleton Kennedy (1795–1870), U.S. secretary of the Navy, congressman, speaker of Maryland General Assembly, author, led effort to end slavery in Maryland
- James Lawrence Kernan (1838–1912), Yiddish theater manager and philanthropist
- Stu Kerr (1928–1994), television personality and weatherman
- Ernest Keyser (1876–1959), sculptor
- Stanton Kidd (born 1992), basketball player for Hapoel Jerusalem in the Israeli Basketball Premier League
- Greg Kihn (1949–1924), pop musician
- David J. Kim (born 1979), publisher of Teen Ink, co-founder of C2 Education
- J. William Kime (1934–2006), commandant of U.S. Coast Guard, 1990–1994
- D.King (born 1989), rapper
- Mel Kiper Jr. (born 1960), football analyst
- Benjamin Klasmer (1891–1949), musician
- Jim Knipple (born 1977), professional stage director
- Tate Kobang (born 1992), real name Joshua Goods, rapper
- Adam Kolarek (born 1989), pitcher in the Atlanta Braves organization
- Jeff Koons (born 1955), artist and sculptor, graduate of Maryland Institute College of Art, Baltimore
- Ruth Krauss (1901–1993), author of children's books
- Steve Krulevitz (born 1951), American-Israeli tennis player

== L ==
- Henrietta Lacks (1920–1951), namesake of HeLa cell line
- Mary Lange (ca. 1784–1882), founder of the Oblate Sisters of Providence and a school for free black children
- Bucky Lasek (born 1972), pro skateboarder
- Maysa Leak (born 1966), jazz singer
- Jerry Leiber (1933–2011), lyricist ("Hound Dog", "Stand by Me", "Poison Ivy", "Is That All There Is?", "Kansas City")
- Noah Lennox (born 1978), known as Panda Bear, sings and plays drums and electronics in band Animal Collective
- Ivan Leshinsky (born 1947), American-Israeli basketball player
- Barry Levinson (born 1942), screenwriter, Academy Award-winning film director, producer of film and television
- Kevin Levrone (born 1968), IFBB professional bodybuilder, musician, actor and health club owner
- Hank Levy (1927–2001), jazz composer, founder of Towson University's jazz program
- Reggie Lewis (1965–1993), professional basketball player for the Boston Celtics
- Reginald F. Lewis (1942–1993), businessman
- Kevin Liles (born 1968), record executive; former president of Def Jam Recordings and vice president of The Island Def Jam Music Group
- Eli Lilly (1838–1898), soldier, pharmaceutical chemist, industrialist, entrepreneur, founder of Eli Lilly and Company
- Laura Lippman (born 1959), author of detective fiction
- Doug Llewelyn (born 1938), reporter and television personality, born in Baltimore
- Alan Lloyd (1943–1986), composer, born in Baltimore
- Walter Lord (1917–2002), non-fiction author
- Los (born 1982), real name Carlos Coleman, rapper
- Morris Louis (1912–1962), abstract expressionist painter
- G. E. Lowman (1897–1965), clergyman and radio evangelist
- Chris Lucas, country singer with LoCash
- Katharine Lucke (1875–1962), organist and composer
- Edmund C. Lynch (1885–1938), business leader graduate of Boys' Latin, Johns Hopkins and co-founder of Merrill Lynch & Co.

== M ==
- William M. Maloy (1874–1949), state delegate and state senator, Democratic candidate for governor
- Marvin Mandel (1920–2015), former governor of Maryland, assumed office upon resignation of Spiro Agnew
- Ann Manley (c. 1828 – after 1870), brothel proprietor
- Mario (born 1986), born Mario Dewar Barrett, singer, grew up in Gwynn Oak, Maryland in Baltimore County
- Todd Marks (born 1976), local businessman and entrepreneur
- Thurgood Marshall (1908–1993), first African-American U.S. Supreme Court justice
- Joseph Maskell (1939–2001), Catholic priest accused of sexual abuse
- Nancy Mowll Mathews (born 1947), art historian, curator, and author
- Aaron Maybin (born 1988), football player for Buffalo Bills, picked in 2009 NFL draft
- Ernest G. McCauley (1889–1969), aviation pioneer
- Shane McClanahan (born 1997), pitcher and 2-time All-Star for the Tampa Bay Rays
- Angel McCoughtry (born 1986), basketball player; first overall pick in 2009 WNBA draft by Atlanta Dream
- Jim McKay (James Kenneth McManus, 1921–2008), television sports journalist, Olympic and Wide World of Sports host
- Theodore R. McKeldin (1900–1974), governor of Maryland
- Randolph Harrison McKim (1842–1920), American Episcopal clergy and writer
- Georgie A. Hulse McLeod (1827–1890), author, educator, temperance activist
- H.L. Mencken (1880–1956), journalist and social critic known as "the Sage of Baltimore"
- Ottmar Mergenthaler (1854–1899), inventor of linotype machine that revolutionized the art of printing
- Joe Metheny (1955–2017), murderer and suspected serial killer
- Kweisi Mfume (born 1948), former CEO of NAACP and U.S. congressman
- Barbara Mikulski (born 1936), U.S. senator
- Isaiah Miles (born 1994), basketball player in the Israeli Basketball Premier League
- Jamie Miller (born c. 1975), musician, drummer for Bad Religion
- Steve Miller (1950–2024), author of science-fiction stories and novels
- Clarence M. Mitchell Jr. (1911–1984), civil rights leader
- Juanita Jackson Mitchell (1913–1992), civil rights lawyer and activist
- Keiffer J. Mitchell Jr. (born 1967), Baltimore City Council, grandson of civil rights leaders Clarence M. Mitchell Jr. and Juanita Jackson Mitchell
- Parren Mitchell (1922–2007), former U.S. congressman
- Colonel Thomas Hoyer Monstery (1824–1901), duellist, fencing master, mercenary and author
- Garry Moore (Thomas Garrison Morfit, 1915–1993), early television host, I've Got a Secret
- Lenny Moore (born 1933), running back, Baltimore Colts, member of Pro Football Hall of Fame
- Phil Moore (born 1961), host of Nick Arcade
- John E. Morrison (1918–201), US Air Force major general
- Bessie Moses (1893–1965), gynecologist, obstetrician and birth control advocate
- Sean Mosley (born 1989), basketball player for Hapoel Tel Aviv B.C. of Israeli Basketball Premier League
- Nick Mullen (born 1988), comedian best known as the host for the podcast Cum Town
- Billy Murphy Jr. (born 1943), lawyer and judge
- Carl J. Murphy (1889–1967), newspaper editor, journalist
- George B. Murphy Jr. (1906–1986) newspaper editor, journalist, civil rights leader
- John H. Murphy Sr. (1840–1922), African American newspaper publisher
- John L. V. Murphy (1878–1933), member of the Maryland House of Delegates
- Robert Murray (1822–1913), Surgeon General of the United States Army
- William H. Murphy Sr. (1917–2003), judge, lawyer, and civil rights activist
- Max Muscle (1963–2019), born John Czawlytko, professional wrestler known for appearances in WCW in 1990s
- Clarence Muse (1889–1979), actor

== N ==
- Anita Nall (born 1976), Olympic gold medalist swimmer
- Ogden Nash (1902–1971), iconic poet and humorist
- Mildred Natwick (1905–1994), stage, film and television actress
- Gary Neal (born 1984), professional basketball player
- John Needles (1786–1878), Quaker abolitionist, master craftsman of fine furniture
- James Crawford Neilson (1816–1900), architect
- Jeff Nelson (born 1966), professional baseball player, middle relief pitcher
- Harry Nice (1877–1941), 50th governor of Maryland
- Joe Nice (born c. 1976), dubstep DJ, moved to Baltimore from Southampton at the age of two
- Brian Nichols (born 1971), known for 2005 killing spree
- Edward Norton (born 1969), actor, 3-time Academy Award nominee
- Brandon Novak (born 1978), skateboarder and member of Viva La Bam
- Ego Nwodim (born 1988), actress and comedian

== O ==
- Ric Ocasek (1949–2019), vocalist and frontman for The Cars
- Rashard Odomes (born 1996), basketball player in the Israeli Basketball Premier League
- Caroline Schutz O'Fallon (1804–1898) benefactor and philanthropist
- Madalyn Murray O'Hair (1919–1995), activist
- Frank O'Hara (1926–1966), poet
- Johnny Olszewski (born 1982), U.S. representative for Maryland and Baltimore County Executive
- Martin O'Malley (born 1963), born in Washington, D.C., mayor of Baltimore, 61st governor of Maryland
- Ken Ono (born 1968), mathematician, grew up in Towson
- Dorothea Orem (1914–2007), nursing theorist, creator of self-care deficit nursing theory

== P ==
- William Paca (1740–1799), signatory to Declaration of Independence; governor of Maryland
- George W. Padgett (1858–1916), Maryland state delegate and Baltimore sheriff
- Tim Page (born 1954), winner of Pulitzer Prize for Criticism; biographer of Dawn Powell
- Preston A. Pairo Jr. (1927–2010), member of the Maryland House of Delegates
- Jim Palmer (born 1945), born in New York, Baseball Hall of Fame starting pitcher for Baltimore Orioles 1965–84
- James A. Parker (1922–1994), African-American foreign service officer for the U.S. Department of State
- Nicole Ari Parker (born 1971), actress
- Bob Parsons (born 1950), entrepreneur; founder and CEO of Go Daddy
- Travis Pastrana (born 1983), freestyle motocross, x-treme sports professional, spokesman for Red Bull
- Randy Pausch (1960–2008), former professor of computer science, human–computer interaction, and design at Carnegie Mellon University
- Felicia Pearson (born 1980), actress, community volunteer, and convicted drug dealer nicknamed "Snoop", who played the eponymous character (Snoop Pearson) on The Wire
- Nancy Pelosi (born 1940), U.S. representative from California since 1987, speaker of the House
- Clarence M. Pendleton Jr. (1930–1988), chairman of U.S. Commission on Civil Rights from 1981 until death in 1988; worked in Model Cities Program in Baltimore, 1968–1970
- Vincent Pettway (born 1965), boxer, light middleweight boxing champion
- Michael Phelps (born 1985), swimmer from Baltimore County, multiple world-record holder, winner of more gold medals (23) and total medals (28) than any other Olympian
- Tom Phoebus (1942–2019), MLB pitcher
- Jada Pinkett Smith (born 1971), actress and singer
- Greg Plitt (1977–2015), fitness model and actor
- Art Poe, member of College Football Hall of Fame
- Edgar Allan Poe (1809–1849), iconic poet, short story writer, editor and critic
- Edgar Allan Poe (1871–1961), attorney general of Maryland, 1911–1915
- Gresham Poe (1880–1956), football head coach at Virginia in 1903
- John P. Poe, Sr. (1836–1909), attorney general of Maryland, 1891–1895
- Johnny Poe (1874–1915), college football player and coach, soldier of fortune
- Jack Pollack (1899–1977), politician and criminal
- Gordon Porterfield, playwright, actor, poet and educator
- David Portner (born 1979), musician and lead singer of experimental avant-garde artpop band Animal Collective
- Parker Posey (born 1968), actress, known for Dazed and Confused, Waiting for Guffman, Scream 3, Best in Show
- Emily Post (1872–1960), author of etiquette books
- Walter de Curzon Poultney (1845–1929), art collector and socialite
- Boog Powell (born 1941), born in Florida, baseball player for Orioles and Baltimore restaurant owner
- Enoch Pratt (1808–1896), businessman and philanthropist; founded Enoch Pratt Free Library, one of oldest free public libraries in U.S.
- Thomas Rowe Price Jr. (1898–1983), businessman, founder of Baltimore-based investment counsel firm T. Rowe Price
- Helen Dodson Prince (1905–2002), astronomer who pioneered work in solar flares
- Ernest W. Prussman (1921–1944), Medal of Honor recipient
- Rain Pryor (born 1969), actress
- Greg Puciato (born 1980), musician, singer, author

== Q ==
- Robin Quivers (born 1952), sidekick of TV and radio personality Howard Stern

== R ==
- Hasim Rahman (born 1972), boxer, former World Heavyweight Champion
- Frederick Ramsay, UMSM academic and administrator, mystery writer
- Jane Randall, contestant on America's Next Top Model, Cycle 15, and an IMG model
- James Ransone (1979–2025), actor, The Wire, Generation Kill, Sinister, adult Eddie Kaspbrak from It Chapter Two
- John Rawls (1921–2002), professor of political philosophy at Harvard, author
- Sam Ray (born 1991), musician, EDM project Ricky Eat Acid, founder of Teen Suicide, former member of Julia Brown
- Lance Reddick (1962–2023), actor, Col. Cedric Daniels from The Wire
- Angel Reese (born 2002) WNBA all-star forward for the Atlanta Dream
- Chris Renaud (born 1966), animator and illustrator; co-director of The Lorax and Despicable Me; voice of many Minions
- Bryan Reynolds (born 1995), outfielder and All-Star for the Pittsburgh Pirates
- Hilary Rhoda (born 1987), fashion model
- Adrienne Rich (1929–2012), poet, writer, teacher, and feminist
- Hester Dorsey Richardson (1862–1933), author
- Charles Carnan Ridgely (1760–1829), 15th governor of Maryland
- Charles G. Ridgely (1784–1848), United States Navy officer
- Billy Ripken (born 1964), born in Havre de Grace, Maryland, second baseman for Baltimore Orioles
- Cal Ripken Jr. (born 1960), born in Havre de Grace, infielder for Baltimore Orioles, member of Hall of Fame
- Cal Ripken Sr. (1935–1999), coach and manager of Baltimore Orioles
- Brooks Robinson (1937–2023), born Little Rock, Arkansas, third baseman for Baltimore Orioles 1955–77, member of Hall of Fame
- Lenny B. Robinson (1963–2015), born in Baltimore, charity worker who dressed up as superhero Batman
- Frank Robinson (1935–2019), born in Beaumont, Texas, outfielder for Baltimore Orioles, member of Hall of Fame
- Chrisean Rock (born 2000), rapper
- Martin Rodbell (1925–1998), biochemist and molecular endocrinologist; won 1994 Nobel Prize in Physiology or Medicine
- Josh Roenicke (born 1982), baseball player in Cincinnati Reds organization
- Eddie Rommel (1897–1970), Major League Baseball pitcher and umpire
- Adeke Rose, poet, psychoanalyst and teacher
- Carroll Rosenbloom (1907–1979), owner of Baltimore Colts and Los Angeles Rams
- Matt Rosendale (born 1960), Montana state politician and businessman
- Alec Ross (born 1971), author and former senior advisor for Innovation to Secretary of State Hillary Clinton
- Axl Rotten (1971–2016), professional wrestler
- Francis Peyton Rous (1879–1970), pathologist who won Nobel Prize in Physiology or Medicine
- Christopher Rouse (1949–2019), composer, Pulitzer Prize winner
- James Rouse (1914–1996), pioneering real estate developer, civic activist, and philanthropist
- Mike Rowe (born 1962), host of Discovery Channel program Dirty Jobs
- Ruckus, born Claude Marrow, professional wrestler
- Ruff Endz, R&B duo consisting of members David "Davinch" Chance and Dante "Chi" Jordan from Baltimore; best known for songs "No More" and "Someone to Love You"
- Mike Ruocco (born 1983), singer-songwriter of bands Plunge and Cinder Road; bassist of SR-71
- Dutch Ruppersberger (born 1946), U.S. congressman (D)
- Harry W. Rusk (1852–1926), U.S. congressman (D) for Maryland's 3rd District, 1886–1897
- Elizabeth Lownes Rust (1835–1899), philanthropist, humanitarian, Christian missionary
- Babe Ruth (1895–1948), iconic baseball player for New York Yankees, member of Baseball Hall of Fame
- Ida Mary Barry Ryan (1854–1917), philanthropist
- Rye Rye (born 1990), real name Ryeisha Berrain, dancer and rapper

== S ==
- Pat Sajak (born 1946), television personality, Wheel of Fortune host; resides in Maryland
- Al Sanders (1941–1995), TV news anchor WJZ-TV; died in Baltimore
- John Sarbanes (born 1962), U.S. representative for Maryland
- Paul Sarbanes (1933–2020), born in Salisbury, Maryland, former member of Maryland House of Delegates from Baltimore, U.S. congressman, U.S. senator
- William Donald Schaefer (1921–2011), mayor of Baltimore, 58th governor of Maryland, and 32nd Comptroller of Maryland
- Jason Schappert (born 1988), aviator, born in Baltimore
- Kurt L. Schmoke (born 1949), former mayor of Baltimore, current president of the University of Baltimore
- Gina Schock (born 1957), rock drummer The Go Go's, songwriter and actress
- Dwight Schultz (born 1947), actor, played H.M. Murdock in The A-Team series and Lt. Reginald Barclay in Star Trek: The Next Generation
- Henry A. Schultz (1844–1916), state delegate
- Josh Selby (born 1991), pro basketball player, former No. 1 high school prospect in U.S. according to Rivals.com
- Elizabeth Ann Seton (1774–1821), established schools, founded first U.S. religious community of apostolic women, Sisters of Charity (Archdiocese of Baltimore)
- Tupac Shakur (1971–1996), hip hop performer and rapper, lived on Greenmount Ave in East Baltimore for two years
- Karl Shapiro (1913–2000), U.S. poet laureate 1946–47, born in Baltimore
- Philip Sharp (born 1942), U.S. representative from Indiana; born in Baltimore
- Richard Sher (1948–2015), WJZ-TV newscaster, Oprah Winfrey co-host
- Daniel Shiffman (born 1973), programmer, member of board of directors of Processing Foundation, associate arts professor
- Pam Shriver (born 1962), professional tennis player and broadcaster
- Sargent Shriver (1915–2011), born in Westminster, Maryland, politician, activist, driving force behind creation of Peace Corps
- Eli Siegel (1902–1978), poet, critic, founder of philosophy of Aesthetic Realism
- Jeff Siegel (born 1970), musician, writer, investment analyst and renewable energy expert; coined the phrase "green chip stocks"
- Hubert Simmons (1924–2009), Negro league baseball pitcher for the Baltimore Elite Giants
- David Simon (born 1960), journalist for The Baltimore Sun, author, television writer, producer, creator of The Wire
- Wallis Simpson (1896–1986), Duchess of Windsor
- Upton Sinclair (1878–1968), author of The Jungle, Pulitzer Prize winner, born in Baltimore
- Christian Siriano (born 1985), fashion designer; winner of fourth season of Project Runway; graduate of Baltimore School for the Arts
- Sisqó (born 1978), real name Mark Althavan Andrews, R&B and pop singer
- Cameron Snyder (1916–2010), sportswriter for The Baltimore Sun; winner of Dick McCann Memorial Award
- Maelcum Soul (1940–1986), bartender, artist's model, and actress
- Florence Garrettson Spooner (1840s–1935), social reformer
- Raymond A. Spruance (1886–1969), U.S. Navy admiral in World War II
- James Stafford (born 1932), cardinal of the Catholic Church; born in Baltimore
- Steele Stanwick (born 1989), former professional lacrosse player who won the Tewaaraton Trophy and the Jack Turnbull Award
- Melissa Stark (born 1973), television personality and sportscaster for NFL Network
- John Steadman (1927–2001), sportswriter
- Michael S. Steele (born 1958), lieutenant governor of Maryland, first African-American chairman of Republican National Committee
- Gertrude Stein (1874–1946), poet, art collector
- Andrew Sterett (1778–1807), U.S. Naval Officer during the Quasi-War, Captain of USS Enterprise
- Richard D. Steuart (1880–1951), historian, and journalist under the pseudonym Carroll Dulaney
- Harry P. Storke (1905–1985), US Army lieutenant general
- Victor Sulin (1942–2022), lawyer and politician
- Suter Sullivan (1872–1925), professional baseball player
- Rich Swann (born 1991), professional wrestler
- Donald Symington (1925–2013), actor
- Stuart Symington (1901–1988), first secretary of the Air Force; U.S. senator from Missouri

== T ==
- Evan Taubenfeld (born 1983), singer-songwriter
- Michael Tearson (born 1948), pioneer underground DJ, concert and special appearance host, author, recording artist and actor
- Mark Texiera (born 1980), player for New York Yankees 2009–16, 3-time All-Star
- Jon Theodore (born 1973), musician, The Mars Volta's former drummer, Avril Lavigne's former guitarist
- Martha Carey Thomas (1857–1935), educator, suffragist, second president of Bryn Mawr College
- Tracie Thoms (born 1975), actress
- A. Andrew Torrence (1902–1940), Illinois state representative
- Alessandra Torres (born 1980), visual artist
- F. Morris Touchstone (1897–1957), National Lacrosse Hall of Fame coach
- Anne Truitt (1921–2004), minimalist sculptor
- Michael Tucker (born 1944), actor, films and L.A. Law
- Joseph Tumpach (1912–1968), Illinois state representative
- Jack Turnbull (1910–1944), National Lacrosse Hall of Fame player
- Charles Yardley Turner (1850–1918), artist and muralist
- Jerry Turner (1929–1987), television news anchor
- Kathleen Turner (born 1954), actress, graduate of University of Maryland, Baltimore County
- Anne Tyler (born 1941), Pulitzer Prize-winning novelist (The Accidental Tourist)

== U ==
- Ultra Naté (born 1968), house music singer, songwriter, producer, DJ, club promoter, and entrepreneur
- Johnny Unitas (1933–2002), born in Pittsburgh; professional football player for the Baltimore Colts; in Pro Football Hall of Fame
- Leon Uris (1924–2003), novelist, author of Exodus

== V ==
- Matthew VanDyke (born 1979), freedom fighter and prisoner of war in 2011 Libyan Civil War
- Nikolai Volkoff (1947–2018), born in Croatia, Yugoslavia, WWE Hall of Fame wrestler, spent time in Baltimore area

== W ==
- LaMonte Wade Jr. (born 1994), first baseman and outfielder for the San Francisco Giants
- Shatori Walker-Kimbrough (born 1995), basketball player for the Israeli team Maccabi Bnot Ashdod, and the Washington Mystics of the Women's National Basketball Association
- Evan Sewell Wallace (1982–2017), Black Paisley Records, hip hop artist
- Henry Walters (1848–1931), rail magnate (Atlantic Coast Line) and founder of Walters Art Museum in Baltimore
- Dante Washington (born 1970), soccer player
- John Waters (born 1946), filmmaker
- John K. Waters (1906–1989), U.S. Army four-star general
- D. Watkins (born 1980), author
- Earl Weaver (1930–2013), born in St. Louis, Missouri, longtime manager of the Baltimore Orioles; Baseball Hall Of Fame inductee
- Chick Webb (1905–1939), jazz and swing drummer and bandleader; adopted Ella Fitzgerald
- Wendy Weinberg, Olympic medalist swimmer
- Matthew Weiner (born 1965), creator of TV series Mad Men
- Leonard "Boogie" Weinglass (born 1941), founder of Merry-Go-Round clothing empire; portrayed by actor Mickey Rourke in 1982 film Diner
- Harry Wendelstedt (1938–2012), umpire in Major League Baseball
- Terrance West (born 1991), former running back at Towson University and NFL player for the Cleveland Browns, Tennessee Titans, New Orleans Saints, and Baltimore Ravens
- George Hoyt Whipple (1878–1976), graduated and taught medical school at Hopkins; won 1934 Nobel Prize in Medicine
- Reggie White (born 1970), football player
- Ruth White (born 1951), Olympic fencer
- Wade Whitney (born 1967), professional soccer player
- William Pinkney Whyte (1824–1908), U.S. senator, governor of Maryland, mayor of Baltimore
- Emma Howard Wight (1863–1935), author
- Bernard Williams (born 1978), gold medalist in 4 × 100 meter relay at 2000 Sydney Olympics
- LaQuan Williams (born 1988), wide receiver for the Baltimore Ravens who attended Baltimore Polytechnic Institute
- Montel Williams (born 1956), television personality
- Reggie Williams (born 1964), professional basketball player
- Trevor Williams (born 1993), football player
- Mary Willis (born 1940), retired US Army brigadier general
- Ibbie McColm Wilson (1834–1908), poet
- Oprah Winfrey (born 1954), television personality, actress, producer; born in rural Mississippi and raised in Milwaukee; worked at WJZ-TV in Baltimore
- David Wingate (born 1963), professional basketball player
- Danny Wiseman (born 1967), professional ten-pin bowler and 12-time winner on the PBA Tour
- Edward Witten (born 1951), mathematical physicist and a leading researcher in string theory
- James Wolcott (born 1952), journalist and cultural critic
- Abel Wolman (1892–1989), sanitary engineer who standardized municipal water chlorination methods, recipient of the Tyler Prize for Environmental Achievement
- Allan Woodrow (born 1964), author
- Eliza Woods (1872–1961), composer
- Bernie Wrightson (1948–2017), artist, known for horror illustrations and comic books
- Natalie Wynn (born 1988), YouTube personality

== Y ==
- John H. Yardley (1926–2011), pathologist
- Steve Yeager (born 1948), award-winning filmmaker, writer, stage director and educator
- Joe Yingling (1867–1903), professional baseball pitcher

== Z ==
- Geoff Zahn (born 1945), baseball pitcher
- Frank Zappa (1940–1993), singer, guitarist, composer and satirist
- Nick Zedd (1958–2022), filmmaker, author, and painter
- Joanna Zeiger (born 1970), Olympic and world champion triathlete, and author
- Bruce Zimmermann, pitcher in the Baltimore Orioles organization
- Marie Kunkel Zimmerman (1864–1953), soprano
- Lillian Zuckerman (1916–2004), actress

== See also ==
- List of people from Maryland
