= Durang =

Durang is a surname. Notable people with the surname include:

- Charles Durang (1796–1870), American dancer and actor
- Christopher Durang (1949–2024), American playwright
- Edwin Forrest Durang (1829–1911), American architect
- Ferdinand Durang (c. 1785–1831), American actor, first to publicly perform the "Star-Spangled Banner"
- John Durang (1768–1822), early American dancer
  - "Durang's Hornpipe", a dance and tune named for John Durang
