= Jerome Joyce =

Jerome Joyce may refer to:

- Jerome H. Joyce (1865–1924), president of the Aero Club of Baltimore and hotel owner
- Jerome J. Joyce (1939–2019), American farmer, businessman, and politician
