= Gardie =

Gardie may refer to:

- Anna Gardie (c. 1760–1798), French-born American stage actress and dancer
- Gardie, Aude, a commune in France
- Gardie House, Shetland
- the Japanese name for Growlithe, a fictional Pokémon

== See also ==
- De la Gardie family, a Swedish noble family of French origin
  - Pontus De la Gardie (1520–1585), soldier
  - Jacob De la Gardie (1583–1652), statesman and soldier
  - Magnus Gabriel De la Gardie (1622–1686), statesman
  - Axel Julius De la Gardie (1637–1710), field marshal
- Ron Gardenhire (born 1957), nicknamed "Gardy", American former Major League Baseball player, coach and manager
