= James Parrish =

American gridiron football player (1968–2004)

No. 77, 79
- Position: Offensive tackle

Personal information
- Born: May 19, 1968; Baltimore, Maryland, US
- Died: March 10, 2004 (aged 35); Plano, Texas, US
- Listed height: 6 ft 6 in (1.98 m)
- Listed weight: 310 lb (141 kg)

Career information
- High school: Dundalk (MD)
- College: Temple
- NFL draft: 1991: undrafted

Career history
- Miami Dolphins (1991); San Diego Chargers (1992)*; → London Monarchs (1992); → Barcelona Dragons (1992); San Francisco 49ers (1993); Indianapolis Colts (1993); San Francisco 49ers (1993)*; Dallas Cowboys (1993); Philadelphia Eagles (1994)*; Pittsburgh Steelers (1995); New York Jets (1996); Chicago Bears (1996); Montreal Alouettes (1998)*; Kansas City Chiefs (1999)*
- * Offseason or practice squad member only

Awards and highlights
- Super Bowl champion (XXVIII)

Career NFL statistics
- Games played: 18
- Stats at Pro Football Reference

James Herbert Parrish Jr. (May 19, 1968 – March 10, 2004) was an American professional football offensive tackle in the National Football League for the Miami Dolphins, San Francisco 49ers, Indianapolis Colts, Dallas Cowboys, Pittsburgh Steelers, New York Jets and Chicago Bears. He also was a member of the London Monarchs and the Barcelona Dragons in the World League of American Football. He played college football at Temple University.

== Early life ==
Parrish attended Dundalk High School, where he was a two-way player, earning All-county honors at tight end as a senior. He also practiced basketball and track.

He accepted a football scholarship from Temple University and played under future NFL head coach Bruce Arians . He was originally a tight end, before being converted into an offensive tackle as a sophomore. He became a starter at right tackle as a junior.

== Professional career ==
=== Miami Dolphins ===
Parrish was signed as an undrafted free agent by the Miami Dolphins after the 1991 NFL draft on April 30, with the intention of playing him at guard. On August 20, he was placed on the Physically unable to perform list with an injured foot, where he spent all of the season.

=== San Diego Chargers ===
On March 30, 1992, he was signed in Plan B free agency by the San Diego Chargers and was switched to center. He was originally allocated to play with the London Monarchs of the World League of American Football, where he appeared in 5 games, before signing on April 22 with the Barcelona Dragons and playing in one contest. He was released at end of preseason on August 31.

=== San Francisco 49ers (first stint) ===
On May 3, 1993, he was signed as a free agent by the San Francisco 49ers to play tackle and was cut after the season opener on September 7.

=== Indianapolis Colts ===
On September 9, 1993, he was signed by the Indianapolis Colts to play tackle. He was declared inactive in 4 games. He was released on October 13, after getting into a shouting match with a defensive coach over the injury to a wide receiver in practice.

=== San Francisco (second stint) ===
On November 11, 1993, he was signed to the San Francisco 49ers' practice squad and was released two weeks later on December 1.

=== Dallas Cowboys (first stint) ===
On December 7, 1993, he was signed by the Dallas Cowboys to the practice squad. On December 22, he was promoted to the active roster for depth purposes, after Mark Stepnoski was lost for the season with a right knee injury. He was declared inactive for Super Bowl XXVIII. He was released on August 17, 1994.

=== Philadelphia Eagles ===
On August 23, 1994, he signed with the Philadelphia Eagles. He was released two days later on August 25.

=== Dallas Cowboys (second stint) ===
On October 25, 1994, he was signed by the Dallas Cowboys, to provide depth after offensive tackle Erik Williams suffered season-ending injuries in a car accident. On November 1, he was released after one week to make room for offensive tackle Jerry Reynolds.

=== Pittsburgh Steelers ===
On February 22, 1995, he was signed as a free agent with the Pittsburgh Steelers and made the team as a reserve tackle. On September 24, against the Minnesota Vikings, he had his only career start, while playing left tackle in place of an injured John Jackson. He was a part of the team that lost to the Dallas Cowboys in Super Bowl XXX. He was cut on August 25, 1996.

=== New York Jets ===
On August 29, 1996, he signed with the New York Jets to provide depth at tackle after Jumbo Elliott and David Williams were injured. He was released on October 8.

=== Chicago Bears ===
On December 4, 1996, he signed with the Chicago Bears. On August 18, 1997, he was waived with an injury settlement after suffering a torn pectoral muscle.

=== Montreal Alouettes ===
On April 1, 1998, the Montreal Alouettes of the Canadian Football League traded linebacker Henry Newby and defensive tackle Juan Hammonds to the Hamilton Tiger-Cats for the CFL's negotiation-list rights to Parrish. On May 26, he was signed by the Alouettes. He was cut before the start of the season.

=== Kansas City Chiefs ===
On February 8, 1999, he was signed by the Kansas City Chiefs. He was released on August 31.

== Personal life ==
Parrish worked for Merrill Lynch and Morgan Stanley after his retirement. A self-taught computer expert, he was one of the first athletes to launch his own website. On March 10, 2004, he died at the age of 35, after battling cancer.
