= D.King =

African rapper

- Also known as: D.King, DK
- Born: Justin Essandoh; November 27, 1983 (age 42)
- Origin: Crofton, Maryland
- Genres: African Rap
- Occupation: Aspiring Rapper
- Years active: 2001–present
- Website: www.dking730.com

Justin Essandoh (born November 27, 1983), also known as D.King or DK, is an African rapper, songwriter, and recording artist in the African rap genre. The name "D.King" or "DK" is short for "Don and the King".

== Early life ==
Raised in an African immigrant family in Crofton, Maryland, 'D King' grew up in a wealthy neighborhood and attended an upscale private high school in Severn, Maryland, during which time he attempted rapping. At the Hip Hop Summit in 2000, which he and a friend snuck into, 'D King' impressed an A & R of Roc-A-Fella Records with a demo tape.

== Music career ==
His career began as a collaborative artist/writer for Trina and Teairra Marie in 2011. In 2014, he started his own label of songwriters and producers called the 730 Commission and began working on his debut album featuring Snoop Dogg, Trina, Pusha T, and Benny the Butcher, all of which he paid handsomely for a feature. The completed music video for D.King’s first single "Knockaz", featuring Benny the Butcher is slated for release in 2022. This will be followed up by Beautiful Thing featuring Snoop Dogg which hopes to be a blockbuster single, however 'D King' has yet to release an album and has failed to gain any significant success in the music industry despite over 25 years of effort. He also has a Revolt TV feature awaiting his official release.
