= John Borozzi =

American soccer player-coach (born 1954)

Personal information
- Full name: John L. Borozzi
- Date of birth: January 25, 1954 (age 72)
- Place of birth: Baltimore, Maryland, U.S.
- Height: 5 ft 9 in (1.75 m)
- Positions: Midfielder; forward

College career
Years	Team	Apps	(Gls)
1973–1975	Penn Quakers		

Senior career*
Years	Team	Apps	(Gls)
1976	Philadelphia Atoms	8	(0)
1977–1978	Washington Diplomats	0	(0)
1980–1981	Baltimore Blast (indoor)	8	(0)
- * Club domestic league appearances and goals

John Borozzi is an American retired soccer player who played in the North American Soccer League and Major Indoor Soccer League. He later served in a variety of executive positions both at the team and league levels with MISL and Major League Soccer.

== Player ==
=== Youth ===
In 1972, Borozzi graduated from Dundalk High School where he had led his school's soccer team to two state championships, scoring 54 career goals. He attended the University of Pennsylvania where he played on the men's soccer team from 1974 to 1975. In 1974, he was First Team All Ivy. In 1975, he was chosen to play for the U.S. Olympic team as it prepared for qualifications for the 1976 Summer Olympics. His commitments to the Olympic team eventually led Borozzi to drop out of Penn as a senior. He completed his undergraduate degree in 1988 from Towson State.

=== Professional ===
In 1976, Borozzi signed with the Philadelphia Atoms of the North American Soccer League. The team folded at the end of the season, and he signed as a free agent with the Washington Diplomats. He was an unused substitute for the 1977 season and was released a month into the 1978 season. He played eight games for the Baltimore Blast of Major Indoor Soccer League during the 1980–1981 season.

== Management ==
In August 1990, the Blast hired Borozzi as the team's general manager after the previous GM, Stan White, had resigned. In September 1991, he became the deputy commissioner of the Major Soccer League. In February 1993, he joined the Baltimore Bays of USISL as its youth soccer director. In September 1995, the Columbus Crew of Major League Soccer hired Borozzi as its marketing director. In 1998, he moved to the Miami Fusion where he worked in various positions in sales and marketing.

He was inducted into the Maryland Soccer Hall of Fame in 1995.
