= John Durang =

American actor

- Born: January 6, 1768; Lancaster, Pennsylvania, United States
- Died: March 31, 1822 (aged 54); Philadelphia, Pennsylvania, United States
- Spouse(s): Mary McEwen (m. ?-1812; her death); Elizabeth ? (m. ?-March 31, 1822; his death)
- Parent(s): Jacob and Catherine Durang

John Durang (January 6, 1768 – March 31, 1822) was the first native-born American to become known as a dancer.

Said to be George Washington's favorite performer, he had danced the hornpipe, a lively, jiglike solo exhibition so called because it was originally performed to music played on a woodwind instrument known as a hornpipe. Durang was also an equestrian and performer of various circus equestrian acts and entertainments.

== Early years ==
John Durang was the eldest of seven children born to parents who had immigrated to the United States from the Alsace region of northeastern France, bordering Germany. His father, Jacob Durang, was from Strasbourg; his mother, Catherine (Arten) Durang, was from Wissembourg. Soon after their arrival in 1767, they settled in York County, Pennsylvania, in the German-speaking region whose inhabitants are still known today as the Pennsylvania Dutch (Pennssilfaanish Deitsch).

John Durang was born in Lancaster, in the home of his mother's sister, but he grew up mostly in nearby York (aka Yorktown). He was educated at the Christ Lutheran Church school, where instruction was in German, supplemented by French and English. He had no formal dance training, but he was, according to his memoirs, attracted to the liveliness of the hornpipe, which "charmed his mind," while he was still a boy.

As early as 1780, at age twelve, he learned "the correct style of dancing a hornpipe" from a visiting French dancer and made it his specialty. At fifteen he left home, went to Boston, and in 1785 joined Lewis Hallam's Old American Company, where he acted in "La Friçassée," a comic number, and danced the hornpipe between acts.

== Professional career ==
Hallam's company advertised its performances as "lectures," as plays and ballets were then legally banned, and specialized in presenting patriotic extravaganzas. During his first season with the company, Durang took violin lessons from a musician named Hoffmaster, who composed a tune for him that became known as "Durang's Hornpipe." Hoffmaster's given name is absent from records of the time. As he was quite short, under four feet tall, he is described as a "German dwarf." The tune was an immediate hit and is still popular among bluegrass fiddlers of today. Durang continued to dance to it for many years, as it had become his signature piece.

In 1790, Durang danced a nautical-style hornpipe in The Wapping Landlady, a comic piece about an amorous landlady and a group of Jack Tars. His performance of the number solidified his reputation as an unparalleled performer of the dance. The tune for it is still thought of as "The Sailor's Hornpipe".

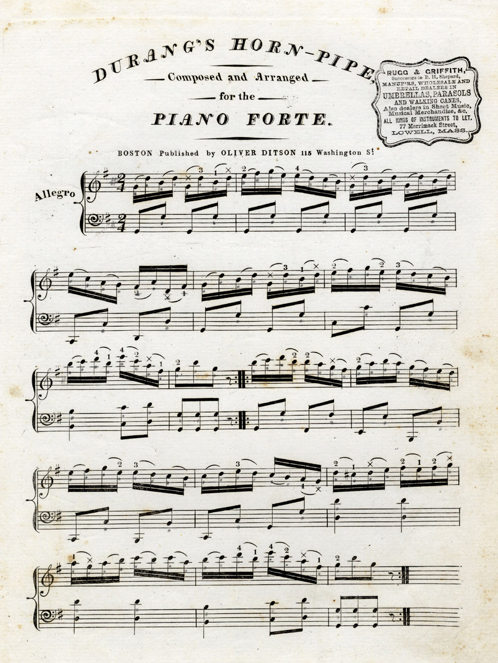
Sheet music for Durang's Horn Pipe published by Oliver Ditson, in Washington Street, Boston 19th century

Around this time, as the federal anti-theater laws were being relaxed, many European performers began to visit the United States. From his collaboration with, among others, Alexandre Placide, he acquired skills in classical ballet, acting, fencing, acrobatics, tightrope walking (rope dancing), clowning, pantomime, choreography, and theater management.

He toured with the Hallam troupe for seven years, performing as Saramouche in a harlequinade called The Touchstone, while dancing and playing other roles. In 1791, he appeared on stage in blackface, as Friday in a production of Robinson Crusoe. In 1794, he appeared in Ann Julia Hatton's Tammany: The Indian Chief, whose hero, also called Tamanend, was a popular figure in local history. It was one of the first operas written in the United States with an American subject and is the earliest known drama about Native Americans. Soon thereafter, Durang danced with well-known ballerina Anna Gardie in La Forêt Noire, the first serious ballet given in America.

In 1795, Durang was hired by John Bill Ricketts to produce pantomimes with his Philadelphia circus. Begun as a riding school that gave equestrian exhibitions, the circus was housed in a building called the New Amphitheater, which included both a riding ring and a stage. Equestrian acts were at the heart of the circus, but the roster of performers also included clowns, comic dancers, acrobats, and a rope walker as well as actors in playlets and pantomimes. Durang's talents were tailor-made for the job. He worked as a writer, producer, and dancer with the Ricketts Circus, in Philadelphia and New York, from 1796 until 1799. Among its patrons was George Washington, a riding enthusiast, who is known to have attended performances in 1793 and 1797, when he certainly witnessed Durang dancing his hornpipe.

When Ricketts closed his shows, Durang turned to theater management and became a partner in Philadelphia's famed Southwark Theater, where President Washington was a frequent patron. From 1800 to 1819, Durang acted, produced, and directed theater in Philadelphia during the winter while touring with his traveling troupe of performers to outlying areas during the summer. Among the works he staged was Francis Hopkinson's song-poem "The Battle of the Kegs", a pioneering attempt at introducing American themes onto American stages.

== Family and later life ==
In February 1787, Durang married Mary McEwen, a dancer, with whom he had six children: Charles, Richard Ferdinand, Augustus Felix, Charlotte Elizabeth, Juliet Catherine ("Julia"), and Mary Ann. All were trained as dancers and actors in their youth, and all six of them accompanied their father on summer tours of towns around Philadelphia, where he presented bits of plays, ballets, acrobatics, puppet shows, equestrian feats, and the ever-popular hornpipe. Charles followed in his father's varied footsteps as an actor, ballet master, author, and stage manager. Ferdinand had a long career as an actor and dancer but is best remembered as the musician who suggested the tune for Francis Scott Key's poem that eventually became the lyrics of "The Star-Spangled Banner".

Charlotte and Julia were both successful dancers and actresses. The former had a relatively brief career, but Julia, under her married names, became quite famous. Between 1822 and 1837, Julia Durang Godey Wallace appeared on stage in New York in at least sixty-seven different productions of ballets, plays, and operas. Augustus gave up performing, became a sailor, and was lost at sea. Mary Ann, the youngest of the siblings, danced on stage in her youth but then dropped out of sight.

In his later years, Durang largely gave up performing, describing himself as a "dance instructor" in his memoirs. He died in 1822 at age fifty-four and, according to his expressed wishes, was buried in Saint Mary's churchyard in Philadelphia.
