= Shelly Blake-Plock =

American songwriter

- Born: October 8, 1974 (age 52); Baltimore, Maryland, U.S.
- Genres: avant, experimental
- Instruments: guitar, piano, organ, voice
- Years active: 1995–present
- Label: Fall Records Umlaut Records
- Website: www.shellyblakeplock.com

Shelly Blake-Plock (born October 8, 1974 in Baltimore, Maryland) is a writer whose work has spanned fiction, poetry, songwriting, and technical writing for open source research. He is president of the Institute for Infrastructure and Interoperable Data in Learning and as an entrepreneur is co-founder of Yet Analytics.

== Work ==
Shelly Blake-Plock is co-founder of Yet Analytics.

Shelly Blake-Plock was an educator and education blogger. A founder of the Baltimore EdTech Forum, Blake-Plock was blogger-in-chief at TeachPaperless and taught in the Johns Hopkins University School of Education.

== Music ==
Blake-Plock's musical work includes elements of folk and blues as well as free improvisation, electronica, and unorthodox recording techniques. His early work consisted “almost entirely of rudimentary home recordings of songs committed to tape as they were being written, never to be refined or recast. Partially inspired by the field recordings of Alan Lomax, Blake [used] a one-take method to get back to the essence, as he sees it, of folk music, which once hinged on a much closer relationship between audiences and those who made it. In this light, his works-in-progress can be seen as a rather unpretentious attempt to rehumanize (and even bring the 'folk' back into) folk music."

Around 2004, Blake-Plock's work took on a more wholly improvised quality seemingly inspired both by European Free Improvisation as well as American noise and performance art. Blake-Plock's 2007 album The Violencestring is a musical narrative consisting almost entirely of free improvised music and studio manipulation.

In 2006, Blake-Plock and double-bassist Joel Grip performed as a duo live for 48 continuous hours. The performance was a benefit for Public Health Music, a non-profit organization; Blake-Plock is an official partner of the organization.

Starting in 2008, Shelly Blake-Plock was a member of the Red Room Collective and was on the board of the High Zero Foundation. He performed as a member of John Berndt's Second Nature Improvising Orchestra.

=== Musical collaborations ===
Rather than maintain a regular band, Shelly Blake-Plock has usually collaborated with various musicians in ad hoc ensembles on recording and live projects.

Most recently, Shelly Blake-Plock has recorded electronic music under the name Pentary Th'Mos and has contributed to the musical project, SIGINT.

Apache, What Apocrypha Have You a limited edition released in 2004, contained live collaborations with Joel Grip and Devin Gray recorded on tour.

Blake-Plock was a member of Joel Grip's 2005 Unanimal Ensemble with Audrey Chen, Tom Goldstein, Tim Murphy, Devin Gray, Ben Frock, Niklas Barnö, and Sophia Jernberg.

In 2006, Blake-Plock collaborated with Marcus Doverud, Andreas Werliin, and Per Wålstedt on several performance art pieces presented at the Hagenfesten festival in Dala-Floda, Sweden.

Joel Grip was music director in 2007 on the recording of Blake-Plock's The Violencestring. Musicians performing on the album included Carly Ptak, John Dierker, Niklas Barnö, Eve Risser, Ryan Dorsey, Lawrence Lanahan, Twig Harper, Jenny Gräf Sheppard, Lyle Kissack, Ben McConnell, and Aaron Henkin.

Blake-Plock was part of the 2008 Transformation of Sound Tour with Eve Risser, Yuko Oshima, Joel Grip, Niklas Barnö, Yann Joussein, and Lars Åhlund.

Blake-Plock is a regular member of John Berndt's 'Second Nature' -- a large-format free improvising orchestral ensemble.
