= Rome Cee =

American rapper

Jerome Carrington (born December 25, 1982), better known by his stage name Rome Cee, is an American rapper from Baltimore, MD. Rome was labeled as one of Baltimore hip-hop’s most promising talents in 2010 with two “FreEP”s and one collaborative record with Justin Ambush, all self-released via his Band Camp page. He garnered local attention after joining with Baltimore label Under Sound Music. His fourth project, The Extra Mile features Brooklyn Rapper Sean Price and was voted best album in Baltimore City Paper's 2011 Best of Baltimore issue. In November 2009, Rome opened up for Juelz Santana at the Velvet Rope in Baltimore City. In 2011, he was featured on The Mid-Atlantic Mic Session compilation with various Baltimore artists.

== Early life ==
Rome's father served in the military and moved the family frequently until finally returning to the family's hometown in Baltimore. Rome attended Walbrook High school and later dropped out.

=== Discography ===
Albums

- So Much More (2010)
- Street Scholar (2010)
- Tunnel Vision (2011)
- The Extra Mile (2011)

Mixtapes

- Ceaser's Palace Volume 1 (2008)

=== Featured singles ===
Year	Single	Artists	Album	Label
2011	By Your Side	Rome Cee	The Mid-Atlantic Mic Session (iTunes/Napster)	New Muzic Group
2011	It's Gonna Come	Rome Cee	The Mid-Atlantic Mic Session (iTunes/Napster)	New Muzic Group

Videos

Year	Title	Director(s)
2011	"By Your Side"	Ian Mattingly
