= WJZ-TV =

Television station in Baltimore

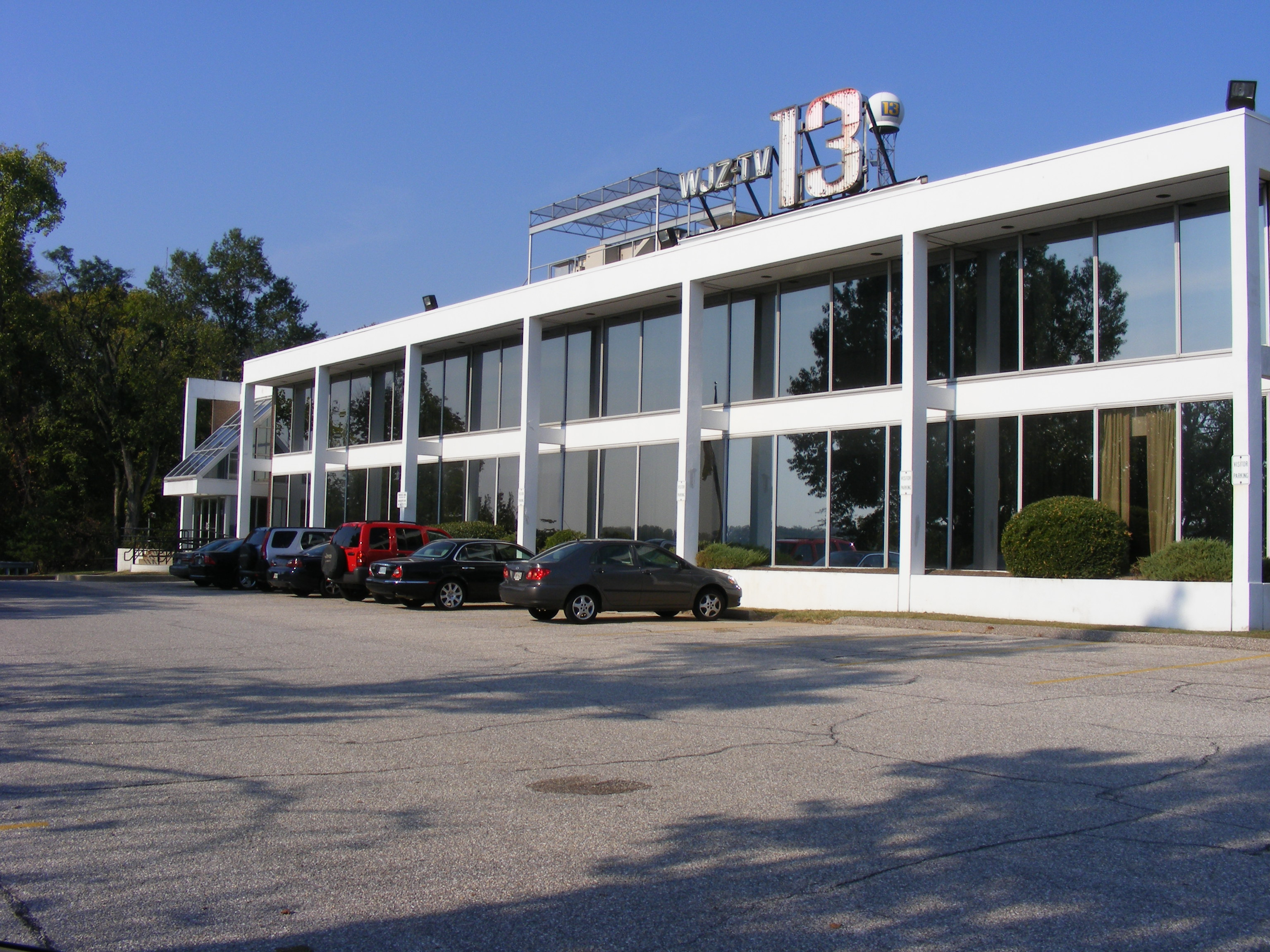
- Baltimore, Maryland; United States
- Channels: Digital: 11 (VHF); Virtual: 13
- Branding: WJZ; WJZ News; CBS News Baltimore; CBS Baltimore (alternate)

Programming
- Affiliations: 13.1: CBS; for others, see § Subchannels

Ownership
- Owner: CBS Television Stations; (CBS Television Licenses LLC)

History
- Founded: May 1946
- First air date: November 1, 1948
- Former call signs: WAAM (1948–1957)
- Former channel numbers: Analog: 13 (VHF, 1948–2009); Digital: 38 (UHF, 1998–2009), 13 (VHF, 2009–2020)
- Former affiliations: ABC (1948–1995); DuMont (secondary, 1948–1956)
- Call sign meaning: Taken from the former WJZ radio, now WABC

Technical information
- Licensing authority: FCC
- Facility ID: 25455
- ERP: 30 kW
- HAAT: 305 m (1,001 ft)
- Transmitter coordinates: 39°20′5″N 76°39′2″W

Links
- Public license information: Public file; LMS
- Website: www.cbsnews.com/baltimore/

WJZ-TV (channel 13) is a television station in Baltimore, Maryland, United States, serving as the market's CBS outlet. It is owned and operated by the network's CBS Television Stations division, and maintains studios and offices on Television Hill in the Woodberry section of Baltimore, adjacent to the transmission tower it shares with several other Baltimore broadcast outlets.

== History ==
=== Early history ===
The station first signed on the air on November 1, 1948, as WAAM, becoming the third television station in Baltimore behind WBAL-TV (channel 11) and WMAR-TV (channel 2), all within just over a year. The station was originally owned by Radio-Television of Baltimore Inc., whose principals were Baltimore businessmen and brothers, Ben and Herman Cohen. Channel 13 was originally an ABC affiliate, the network's fifth outlet to be located on the East Coast. It carried a secondary affiliation with the DuMont Television Network until its closure in 1956. Both affiliations moved from WMAR-TV, which became an exclusive CBS affiliate.

On the station's second day of operations, WAAM broadcast the 1948 presidential election returns and various entertainment shows, remaining on the air for 23 consecutive hours. Channel 13 has been housed in the same studio facility, located near Druid Hill Park on what was then known as Malden Hill (now known as Television Hill), since the station's inception; the building was the first in Baltimore specifically designed for television production and broadcasting. As a DuMont affiliate, WAAM originated many Baltimore Colts games for the network's National Football League coverage.

=== Purchase by Westinghouse, becoming WJZ-TV ===
The Westinghouse Electric Corporation purchased WAAM from the Cohen brothers in May 1957. Westinghouse then took control of the station in August of that year, and the following month, the station changed its callsign to WJZ-TV. The WJZ call letters had previously resided on ABC's flagship radio/television combination in New York City, which changed its calls to WABC-AM-FM-TV in 1953. However, Westinghouse's history with that set of call letters went back even further, as it was the original owner of WJZ radio, the flagship station of NBC's Blue Network, which would eventually become ABC.

All of Baltimore's television stations at the time had fairly short transmission towers in the medium's early years; channel 13's original tower was located next to the station's studios. In 1959, WJZ-TV collaborated with WBAL-TV and WMAR-TV to form a joint venture to build the world's first three-pronged candelabra tower. Constructed behind the WJZ-TV studios and opposite the original channel 13 tower, it was the tallest free standing television antenna in the United States at the time of its completion. The new tower significantly improved channel 13's signal coverage in central Maryland, and also added new viewers in Pennsylvania, Delaware, Washington, D.C., and Virginia.

WJZ-TV nearly lost its ABC affiliation in 1977, when the network briefly pursued WBAL-TV just as ABC became the most-watched broadcast network (in prime time) in the United States for the first time. However, WBAL-TV declined the ABC affiliation offer due to ABC's last-place network evening newscast offerings of the time (a situation that would improve in ensuing years), keeping ABC on channel 13.

=== Switch to CBS ===
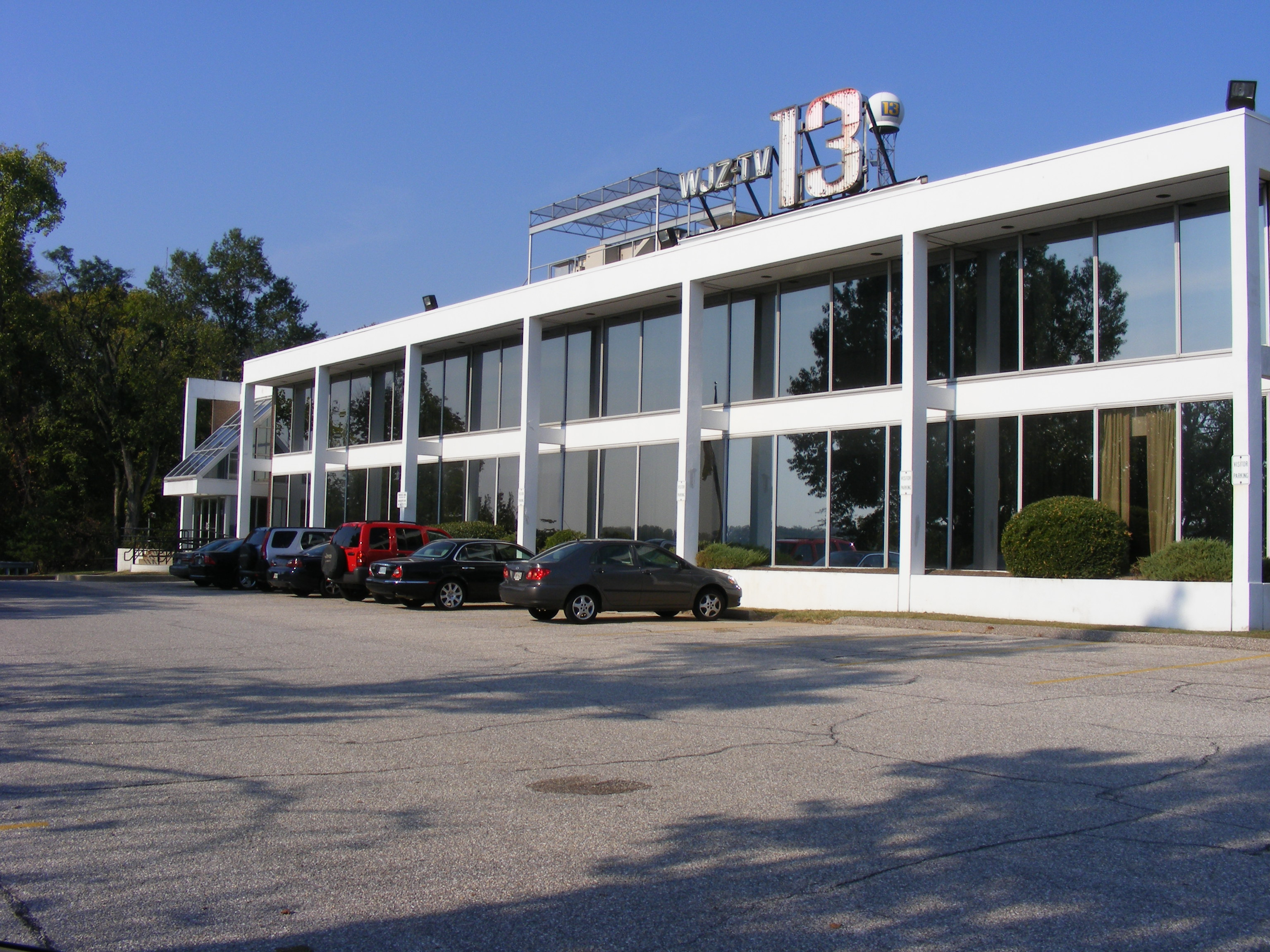
The WJZ-TV studio and office facility, on Television Hill in Baltimore.

In June 1994, ABC agreed to an affiliation deal with the broadcasting division of the E. W. Scripps Company, which resulted in three of Scripps' television stations—WMAR-TV in Baltimore, WFTS-TV in Tampa and KNXV-TV in Phoenix—becoming ABC affiliates. ABC agreed to the deal as a condition of keeping its affiliation on Scripps' two biggest stations, WXYZ-TV in Detroit and WEWS in Cleveland. Both stations had been heavily courted by CBS, which was about to lose two of its longtime affiliates—WJBK and WJW—to Fox. ABC was reluctant to include WMAR, then an NBC affiliate, in the deal; it had been a ratings also-ran for over 30 years while WJZ-TV was one of the strongest ABC affiliates in the nation. However, not wanting to be relegated to UHF in two markets with few viable choices for a new affiliate, ABC opted to end its 46-year affiliation with channel 13 and move its affiliation to channel 2.

Group W felt betrayed by ABC after so many years of loyalty, as channel 13 had been ABC's longest-tenured affiliate at the time (a distinction that now belongs to WJLA-TV in Washington). As a safeguard, it began to shop for an affiliation deal of its own. In the early summer of 1994, the station was approached by NBC to negotiate an affiliation agreement with the network to replace WMAR as its Baltimore affiliate. Channel 13 station management would later turn the offer down. Instead, one month later, Westinghouse agreed to a long-term affiliation contract with CBS, resulting in WJZ-TV, as well as WBZ-TV in Boston and KYW-TV in Philadelphia, switching to CBS (Westinghouse's two other television stations, KDKA-TV in Pittsburgh and KPIX-TV in San Francisco, were already CBS affiliates). The affiliation switch, the second in Baltimore television history, occurred early on the morning of January 2, 1995. Though ABC's affiliation contract with channel 13 did not expire until January 1995, starting in 1994, all CBS programs preempted by WBAL-TV would air on WJZ-TV. The last ABC prime time program to air on channel 13 was the made-for-TV movie A Dangerous Affair, which was broadcast at 9 p.m. Eastern Time on January 1, and the final overall ABC program to air on channel 13 was the January 2 edition of ABC World News Now. As a result, channel 13 became the third station in Baltimore to affiliate with CBS. The network had originally affiliated with WMAR-TV in 1948 before moving to WBAL-TV in 1981. Almost by default, the 1995 switches saw the NBC affiliation return to WBAL-TV after a 14-year absence.

CBS' move to WJZ immediately resolved several scheduling issues the network had with WBAL-TV. The station had picked up half of its Saturday morning programming, as well as an hour of daytime programming. WJZ-TV also picked up the Late Show with David Letterman, which had aired on WNUV (channel 54) after WBAL passed on it (one of the few CBS affiliates to do so). Westinghouse then bought CBS on November 24, 1995, making WJZ-TV a CBS owned-and-operated station. Notably, this marked the first time that CBS had wholly owned a television station in the Baltimore/Washington corridor; it had been minority owner of WTOP-TV in Washington (now WUSA) from 1950 to 1955.

Logo used from 2017 to 2023. The "13" had been used since 1963.

WJZ-TV used a stylized "13" logo, using a font face exclusive to Group W, from 1967 to 2023. It was the last remaining Group W/Westinghouse station to utilize the typeface. In 2002, the CBS eye was added, and in 2018, the station switched to a silver and gold-colored version (resembling logo styles used by its sister stations) with the WJZ call letters displayed below in squares.

CBS extended its usage of the WJZ call sign to radio on November 3, 2008, when CBS Radio changed the call signs of two of its Baltimore stations, WHFS (105.7 FM) and WJFK (1300 AM), to WJZ-FM and WJZ in reflection of their connection to WJZ-TV; the changes coincided with the move of WJFK's local sports radio programming, including a program co-hosted by WJZ-TV sports anchor Mark Viviano, to WJZ-FM. On February 2, 2017, CBS Radio announced that it would spin off from CBS Corporation and merge with Entercom (now Audacy, Inc.), effectively separating WJZ-TV from the WJZ radio stations; the transaction closed on November 17, 2017.

== Programming ==
WJZ-TV was the Baltimore area affiliate of the It's Academic high school quiz competition, currently on hiatus looking for a TV station in Baltimore since its long time sponsor backed out.

Over the years, WJZ-TV frequently preempted ABC programming in favor of locally produced programs and syndicated content from Westinghouse's broadcasting division, Group W, such as The Mike Douglas Show and the original version of The Merv Griffin Show; notably, the former ABC daytime soap opera Dark Shadows was preempted during the mid-1960s. From 1970 to 1972, WJZ-TV dropped General Hospital, The Newlywed Game, and The Dating Game to make room for The Mike Douglas Show, the three shows were seen instead on now-defunct WMET-TV, and not telecast in color. By 1972, WJZ-TV re-added The Newlywed Game to their schedule. During the mid-1970s, WJZ-TV re-added General Hospital, and stayed on the station until the switch to WMAR-TV in 1995. WJZ-TV aired The Edge of Night in pattern from its December 1975 relocation from CBS to ABC until September 16, 1983; the following Monday, the soap opera was moved to a one-day delay time slot of 11 am, where it remained until the series took a two-week hiatus in favor of ABC's coverage of the 1984 Summer Olympics. Despite the preemptions and delays, ABC was more than satisfied with channel 13, which was one of its strongest affiliates. Additionally, Baltimore viewers could watch ABC programs on Washington's WMAL-TV/WJLA-TV (channel 7), whose signal decently covers most of the Baltimore area.

From 1957 to 1964, one of the station's highest-rated programs was The Buddy Deane Show, an in-studio teen dance show similar to ABC's American Bandstand, which WJZ-TV also preempted in favor of the Deane program. Deane's program was the inspiration for the John Waters 1988 motion picture Hairspray and its subsequent Broadway musical version, which in turn has been made into a film.

Since becoming a CBS affiliate, WJZ-TV has carried the network's lineup in pattern with virtually no preemptions except for breaking news emergencies and Orioles baseball games, as per an agreement between Group W and CBS. Prior to September 2019, WJZ-TV aired the CBS Evening News on a half-hour tape delay, due to an hour-long 6 p.m. newscast.

=== Sports programming ===
WJZ-TV has been the de facto broadcaster for the Baltimore Ravens of the National Football League, airing a majority of the team's contests since CBS acquired rights to the American Football Conference in 1998, including their Super Bowl XXXV and XLVII appearances, both victories, at the end of the 2000 and 2012 seasons.

Channel 13 has also served two stints as the television home of the Baltimore Orioles baseball team, from 1954 to 1978 and from 1994 until 2017. It was one of the few "Big Three" stations to air baseball on a regular basis. As an ABC affiliate, WJZ-TV also broadcast select Orioles games via ABC's MLB broadcast contract from 1976 to 1989, including their 1979 and 1983 World Series appearances, the latter won by the team.

=== News operation ===
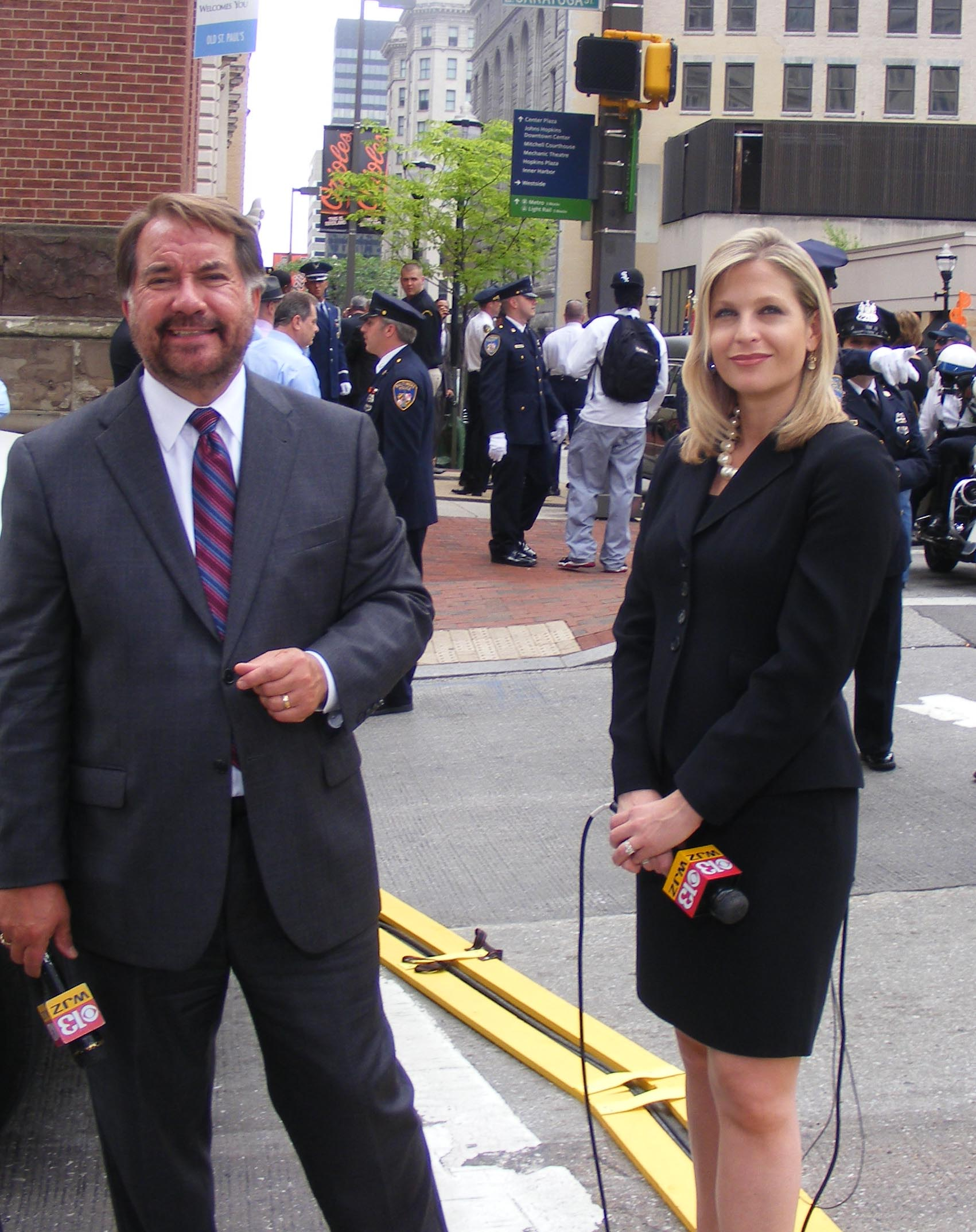
Former WJZ anchors Don Scott and Jessica Kartalija preparing for a live-shot during the funeral of former Maryland Governor William Donald Schaefer, April 28, 2011.

WJZ-TV presently broadcasts 44 hours, 55 minutes of locally produced newscasts each week (with 7 hours, 35 minutes each weekday, four hours on Saturdays and three hours on Sundays).

Soon after Westinghouse bought WJZ-TV, it significantly beefed up the station's news department. On October 12, 1957, WJZ-TV cameraman John Kelly filmed a motion picture of the final stage of Sputnik 1's rocket crossing the pre-dawn sky of Baltimore, featured in a half-hour special program on Sputnik, broadcast that evening by Westinghouse sister station WBZ-TV in Boston. Within a few years, it passed WMAR-TV for second place. Like the other Group W stations, WJZ-TV adopted the Eyewitness News format pioneered at Philadelphia sister station KYW-TV. By the early 1970s, WJZ-TV had passed WBAL-TV for first place—a lead it held for over 30 years. Around 2001, however, WBAL-TV passed WJZ-TV for first place in all evening timeslots, though WJZ-TV still placed a strong second. However, in the official November 2009 Nielsen ratings sweeps period, the first since the debut of The Jay Leno Show (which aired on WBAL-TV), WJZ-TV returned to a dominant position at 11 p.m. for the first time since the early 2000s. Both stations spent the next two years in a virtual dead heat in the late news. Since the November 2011 Nielsen sweeps period, WJZ has regained the lead in all news time slots in both total households and the critical 25–54 demographic; however, WBAL remains a strong second. It has been one of CBS's strongest O&Os ever since the 1995 affiliation switch.

WJZ-TV was the first station in Baltimore to hire a full-time consumer reporter, as well as the first station to organize an investigative reporting team. In 1965, shortly after it adopted the Eyewitness News format, Wiley Daniels became the first African-American anchor in Baltimore. He worked alongside Jerry Turner, one of the most popular anchormen in Baltimore television history. Al Sanders was paired with Turner in 1977; he and Turner were the top news team until Turner succumbed to esophageal cancer. Denise Koch succeeded Turner upon his death in 1988; she remains at the anchor desk. Vic Carter succeeded Sanders following the latter's death in 1995.

WJZ-TV is known as a legacy station and both on-air and off-air employees typically have decades of service. Koch holds the record as the longest-tenured TV news anchor in Baltimore history. She has anchored the station's 6 p.m. broadcast since 1988. The record for the longest-tenured anchor team in Baltimore TV history is also held by WJZ. The former anchor team of Don Scott and Marty Bass topped weekday morning newscast ratings from 1984 to 2014 as co-anchors of Eyewitness News Morning Edition and Rise & Shine. Former WJZ weather anchor Bob Turk holds the title of the longest-tenured talent at a single station in Maryland TV. Turk forecast weather on weekday evenings for nearly 50 years, from 1973 until his dismissal in 2022. Former news director Gail Bending held her title from 1991 until her dismissal on March 31, 2023, also a record for the market.

In 1976, Oprah Winfrey was hired as Jerry Turner's co-anchor for the station's 6 p.m. newscast. By April 1977 she was moved anchor of morning cut-ins and eventually helped to launch and co-hosted channel 13's local talk show, People Are Talking with Richard Sher. Winfrey co-hosted People Are Talking from August 14, 1978, until she left for Chicago in 1984. During that time, she and Sher would also co-anchor Eyewitness News at Noon and in 1983 she teamed up with Marty Bass to launch Eyewitness News Morning Edition.

On October 25, 2009, WJZ-TV became the third Baltimore station to begin airing newscasts in high definition. For several months after the upgrade, field reports were still presented in 4:3 standard definition until it switched over to the 16:9 widescreen format. As of September 2011, all of WJZ-TV's locally produced video footage, including remote field reports, are in HD, making it the first station in Baltimore to do so.

During the noon newscast on August 9, 2018, WJZ-TV unveiled a new set, and introduced the same on-air graphics scheme used by other CBS owned-and-operated stations (the last among the group to do so). On August 20, 2018, WJZ-TV expanded its morning newscasts from 5–7 a.m. to 4:30–7 a.m., becoming the last station in Baltimore to start their morning newscasts at 4:30 am. On September 9, 2019, WJZ debuted a 7 p.m. newscast for the first time, and the CBS Evening News was moved to 6:30 p.m.

WJZ-TV launched a streaming news service, CBSN Baltimore (now CBS News Baltimore, a localized version of the national CBSN service) on August 23, 2021, as part of a rollout of similar services across the CBS-owned stations.

In 2022, the station partnered with The Baltimore Banner. Articles from WJZ's website appear on the Banner's website, while Banner journalists appear on the station's 9 a.m. newscasts.

==== Notable former on-air staff ====
- Nick Charles
- Boomer Esiason – intern while attending the University of Maryland
- Adam May
- Bob McAllister
- Michael Olesker
- Royal Parker
- Al Sanders
- Richard Sher
- Ken Singleton
- Sally Thorner
- Jerry Turner
- Oprah Winfrey

== Technical information ==
=== Subchannels ===
The station's signal is multiplexed:

Subchannels of WJZ-TV
Subchannel	Res.	Short name	Programming
13.1	1080i	WJZ-TV	CBS
13.2	480i	StartTV	Start TV
13.3	480i	Dabl	Dabl
13.4	480i	365BLK	365BLK
13.5	480i	Catchy	Catchy Comedy
13.6	480i	Movies	Movies!

=== Analog-to-digital conversion ===
WJZ-TV shut down its analog signal, over VHF channel 13, on June 12, 2009, the official date on which full-power television stations in the United States transitioned from analog to digital broadcasts under federal mandate. The station's digital signal relocated from its pre-transition UHF channel 38 to VHF channel 13. WMAR-TV took over the channel 38 allocation as it moved its digital signal from channel 52 as a result of the phaseout of channels 52–69.

The switch caused problems for some viewers due to reception issues related to the transition, but the Federal Communications Commission granted WJZ-TV a power increase that helps some people.

=== Spectrum repacking ===
As a part of the repacking process following the 2016–2017 FCC incentive auction, WJZ-TV relocated to VHF channel 11 on July 3, 2020, using virtual channel 13. WBAL-TV concurrently moved to channel 12.

== See also ==
- List of three-letter broadcast call signs in the United States
