= Tyde-Courtney Edwards =

Tyde-Courtney Edwards (born 1987) is an American dancer and businesswoman. She founded Ballet After Dark, an organization that offers ballet classes to survivors of trauma and assault.

== Life and career ==
Edwards was born and raised in Baltimore, Maryland. She began ballet lessons at age three. Edwards attended Baltimore School for the Arts for high school, where she majored in dance. After high school she worked several part-time jobs while working as a freelance dancer.

In 2012, Edwards was attacked in a parking structure by a stranger and awakened in the woods, where her attacker beat her up and raped her. Edwards' mental health deteriorated as she failed to receive support from her family, then-fiancé, and the police. She spent time in a psychiatric facility and began attending counseling sessions at a center for sexual assault survivors. Edwards returned to taking dance classes and credits them with helping her cope with the trauma.

=== Ballet After Dark ===
In May 2015 Edwards founded Ballet After Dark, a "ballet-based fitness program that includes a self-care workshop for sexual and domestic assault survivors." The Baltimore-based organization was the subject of a documentary film by the same name, which premiered at Tribeca Film Festival in 2019. Ballet After Dark was directed by B. Monet and produced and distributed by Queen Latifah's talent company Queen Collective.
