= Anna Gardie =

American actress (died 1798)

- Born: c. 1760; Saint-Domingue
- Died: July 20, 1798 (aged 37–38); New York City, New York
- Cause of death: Murder
- Body discovered: Fraunces Tavern
- Years active: pre 1794–1798
- Known for: Sophia of Brabant, La Foret Noire
- Children: 1

Anna Gardie (c. 1760 – July 20, 1798) was a French Saint-Domingue-born American stage actress and dancer who was known for her roles in ballet-pantomimes such as La Foret Noire and Sophia of Brabant. She was considered one of the first ballet stars in America despite having only a four-year career in the country. Gardie was killed by her husband in 1798 in an apparent murder-suicide.

== Early and personal life ==
Anna Gardie was born c. 1760 in the French colony of Saint-Domingue (now Haiti). She had a son with a performer called Maurison. After separating from Maurison, she met a French nobleman named Gardie, who, in order to marry Anna, forfeited his estates.

== Career ==
She started her performing career in her native Saint-Domingue before travelling to France, where she had a successful stage career. However, due to the French Revolution, Gardie returned home to Saint-Domingue. She was forced to flee again during the Haitian Revolution and settled in the United States. There she joined the Old American Company as a dancer, mime and singer. As part of the company, Gardie made her American debut aged 34 performing in Philadelphia at the Chestnut Street Theater in the pantomime La Foret Noire in 1794, in which she played Lucille. The production was considered to be one of the first American ballet productions. She then danced in the ballet-pantomime Sophia of Brabant in 1795 with the first American male professional dancer, John Durang. Gardie and Durang continued working together again in Tyranny Supressed: or Freedom Triumphant where she played Mellamor. The partnership then continued with Harlequin's Animation; or, Triumph of Mirth and Poor Jack. During a performance of Macbeth on April 9, 1793, in which she played one of the Three Witches, she shocked future president John Adams with her comparison of the character Lady Macbeth to England.

Her success as one of the first ballet stars in America inspired other French performers to emigrate there, resulting in Creole theatrical practices becoming popularized and prevalent in the United States. She continued working with the Old American Company, collaborating with Alexandre Quesnet in The Bird Catcher, Minuet de la Couer and The Two Philosophers; or, The Merry Girl. President George Washington saw many of the company's showings and made several return visits. Gardie also portrayed Doña Anna in the ballet Don Juan, Mrs. Brett in Cooper and Madame Larouge in No Song, No Supper.

During the 1796 season, Gardie acted in Much Ado About Nothing and Robinson Crusoe, as well as again collaborating with Durang in Hamlet, and Tom Thumb. She also danced in The Independence of America; or, The Ever Memorable Fourth of July, in which she symbolically danced as America.

== Death and legacy ==
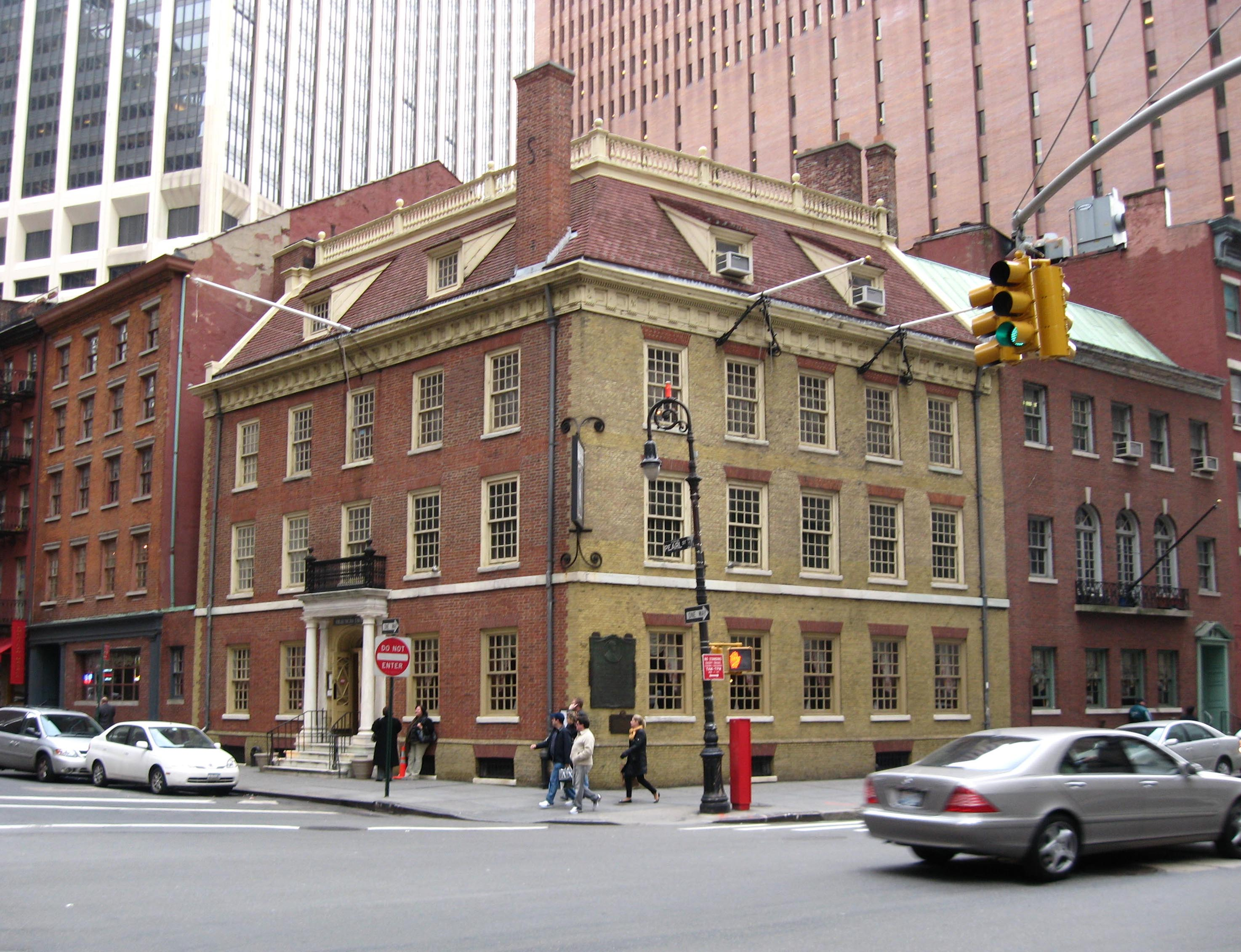
Fraunces Tavern in 2008

It was announced in March 1798 that Gardie intended to open her own dance studio, while her husband taught French there. That July, Gardie and her husband were living at Fraunces Tavern on 54 Pearl Street, along with her son. According to the Weekly Museum newspaper, at around 3 or 4 am on July 20, Gardie's husband moved her son from her bed before lying there himself. When the boy inquired about his mother after she had cried out, he was told by Mr. Gardie that she had only fainted and to remain still. After hearing another noise, her son saw Mr. Gardie dying and his mother dead in bed, having been stabbed with a carving knife in her left breast, while her husband had two knife wounds in the chest. Her death was widely covered in the American press, with over fifty newspaper articles published about the deaths in the months following. The coroner ruled it a murder-suicide committed by her husband, with the apparent motive speculated to have been her refusal to return to her husband's native France.

Over thirty years after her death, Anna Gardie's life was again brought to the public's attention after William Dunlap wrote about her in his 1832 book History of the American Theater, which Dunlap regarded as a key part of American history.

== Sources ==
- Snodgrass, Mary Ellen (October 23, 2025). Business and Professional Women of Colonial America: 146 Biographies, 1585-1781. McFarland, Incorporated. ISBN 9781476655437.
- Reed, Peter P. (2016). "The Life and Death of Anna Gardie: American Theater, Refugee Dramas, and the Specter of Haitian Revolution". Early American Literature. 51 (3).
