= Charles Durang =

American actor

- Born: December 4, 1794; Philadelphia, Pennsylvania
- Died: February 15, 1870 (aged 75); Philadelphia, Pennsylvania
- Occupations: Dancer, actor, dancing master, author, theater historian

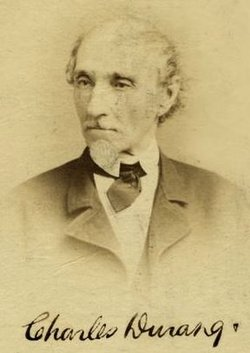
photo portrait of the actor, dancing teacher, writer, and theater historian Charles Durang (1794-1870)

Charles Durang (December 4, 1794 – 1870) was an American actor, dancer, writer, and theater historian.

== Life ==
Charles Durang was born in Philadelphia on December 4, 1794, the son of John Durang, the first native-born American professional dancer. Charles made his first appearance in the Chestnut Street Theater at the age of 7 in 1803, and subsequently performed in almost every theater in the United States. He was actor, author, stage manager, prompter, ballet master, and finally opened a dancing academy. He worked for many years as a dancing master and rehearsal repetiteur at the Chestnut Street Theatre, in the 1840s and 50s. A friend and admirer of his fellow Philadelphian Edwin Forrest, he named his son after the actor. Edwin Forrest Durang eventually became a prominent Philadelphia architect.

Charles Durang was the author of a "History of the Philadelphia Stage from 1752 to 1854," which appeared serially in the Philadelphia Journal. The totality of these newspapers columns, which are an invaluable reference to historians of early American theater, were carefully collected and annotated by Thompson Westcott in 1868, with Durang's assistance. They were bound into six large scrapbooks, along with a multitude of illustrations and prints of actors and theaters of the era. These books are in the collection of the University of Pennsylvania Libraries, and a digitized facsimile is available online.

Durang died in Philadelphia, February 15, 1870.

Durang's descendant, Jack Myers, is the author of several books including Row House Days, Row House Blues, Knights' Gold, The Delco Files, The Pennsylvania Files, The Son of Zodiac, and Treasure Kids!

== Books ==
- Durang's Terpsichore or Ball Room Guide. Turner & Fisher: New York, 1848.
- The Fashionable Dancer's Casket: or, The Ball-Room Instructor, 1856. (HTML and page images at the Library of Congress)
- "History of the Philadelphia Stage, Between the Years 1749 and 1855." Arranged and illustrated by Thompson Westcott, 1868
