= Elmer Greensfelder =

American playwright and inventor (1892–1966)

Elmer Lewis Greensfelder (February 7, 1892 in Baltimore, Maryland – December 19, 1966) was an American playwright and inventor. In 1911, he graduated from Johns Hopkins University, and later he used his degree to serve in World War I.

== Plays ==
In 1932, Elmer Greensfelder won a contest from the Drama League of America for his play Broomsticks-Amen!. Greensfelder also wrote the play Half Past Heaven. Some of his other plays include The Saints Draws a Daggar, The Crocodile Chuckles, Six Stokers Who Own the Bloomin' Earth, and Mark Twain.

== Patents ==
Greensfelder was an inventor with numerous approved patents, including one for "Method and Apparatus For Synchronously Producing Sounds To Accompany Motion Pictures". This patent was a system that would make sound automatically play while a motion picture was playing. Other patents include "Changeable Profile Toy" and "Loose Leaf Binder".
