= Al Sanders =

American journalist and broadcaster

- Born: March 13, 1941; St. Louis, Missouri, US
- Died: May 5, 1995 (aged 54); Baltimore, Maryland, US
- Occupation: Anchorman
- Notable credit(s): Co-anchor of WJZ-TV, Eyewitness News
- Spouse: Ruth
- Children: 3

Al Sanders (March 13, 1941 - May 5, 1995) was an American television news anchorman at WJZ-TV in Baltimore, Maryland. He helped take a third place television newscast to first place, where it stayed throughout his career.

== Background ==
In 1967 Sanders, as Al Gay, worked for radio station KXLW, in St. Louis, Missouri. In 1969, he left for competitor KWK, where he adopted the name Al Sanders, the on-air alias that would follow him through the rest of his career. Sanders joined WJZ-TV in 1972. Five years later, he would replace Oprah Winfrey as Jerry Turner's co-anchor. Turner and Sanders were Baltimore's top news team until 1987, when Turner succumbed to esophageal cancer. Denise Koch joined Sanders on the anchor desk as a fill-in, gaining the role permanently in 1988. Sanders won Emmy Awards in 1993 and 1994 for his regularly featured specialty report, "Picture This." In March 1995, Sanders was diagnosed with lung cancer. Sanders died at the Johns Hopkins Hospital on May 5, 1995, and was replaced by Vic Carter, formerly of WSB-TV in Atlanta., who retired in July of 2024.

== Legacy ==
Each year, the Baltimore Community Foundation awards college scholarships in the name of Al Sanders for those students who are musically inclined. In Baltimore, the corner of Druid Park Drive and Malden Avenue, two blocks from WJZ-TV, was named Al Sanders Place. The adjoining block of Malden Avenue is named Jerry Turner Way, for his former broadcasting partner.

| Preceded by Jerry Turner | WJZ-TV Lead Anchors; 1987/1988 – 1995 | Succeeded by Vic Carter |
