= Margaret Sutton Briscoe =

American writer (1864–1941)

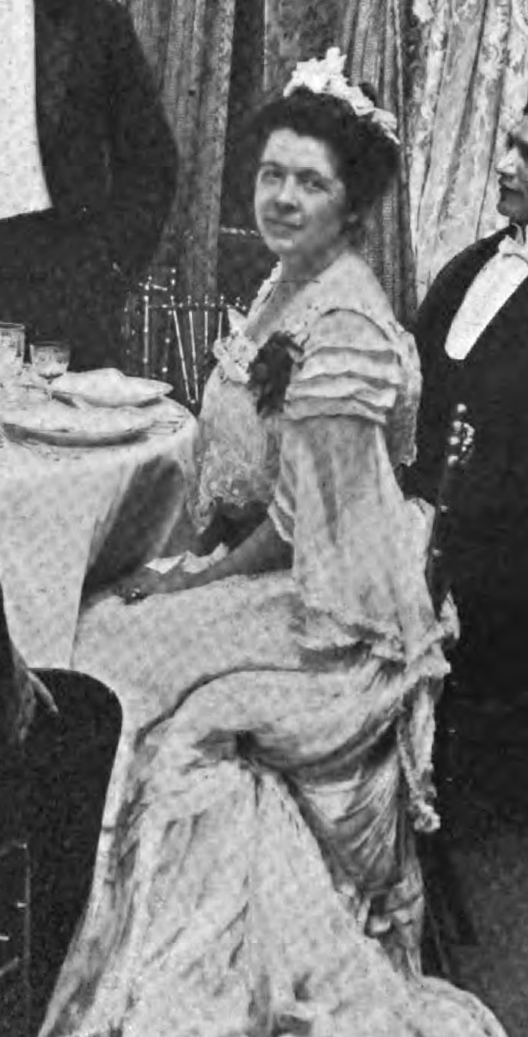
- Margaret Sutton Briscoe Hopkins at Mark Twain's 70th birthday party
- Born: December 7, 1864
- Died: December 16, 1941 (aged 77)
- Occupation: Writer
- Spouse(s): Arthur John Hopkins

Margaret Sutton Briscoe Hopkins (1864 – 1941) was an American short story writer.

== Life and career ==
Margaret Sutton Briscoe was born on December 7, 1864, in Baltimore, Maryland. She was the daughter of Dr. Samuel W. Briscoe and Cornelia Dushane Blacklock Briscoe. Her extended family owned the Sotterly Plantation in Hollywood, Maryland. She was educated by private teachers, as was the custom for women at the time, and later in life regretted not attending college or schooling outside the home.

She began publishing fiction while still in Baltimore, but soon moved to New York City. She published widely, in publications including The Century, Frank Leslie’s Illustrated Weekly, Harper’s Bazzar, The Outlook, and Scribner's Magazine. She continued to write throughout her life but largely stopped publishing in the early 1910s. She knew Mark Twain and attended his 70th birthday party at Delmonico's in New York City on Dec. 5, 1905.

In 1895, she married chemistry professor Arthur John Hopkins, but continued to publish under her maiden name. Arthur Hopkins was a professor at Amherst College and the couple moved to Amherst, Massachusetts, and lived in the Bodyen House at 58 Woodside Avenue, currently the site of Amherst's Kirby Theatre. At Amherst, Margaret Hopkins became active in civic affairs, including the Ladies of Amherst Club, the Amherst School Alliance, and the Amherst Civic League, and served as an unofficial counselor for troubled students.

One of the students Hopkins befriended was poet Robert Francis when she was his landlady for two years. Hopkins introduced Francis to Robert Frost, who became a key influence in Francis' life. On Hopkins' death, Francis wrote a short, gushing tribute called Gusto, Thy Name Was Mrs. Hopkins: A Prose Rhapsody.

The Hopkinses were world travelers and one trip around 1922 was particularly adventurous. They went to Cairo and Alexandria so Arthur Hopkins could research alchemy; he went on to publish the book Alchemy, Child of Greek Philosophy in 1934. Along the way they were shipwrecked on Lesina Island in the Adriatic and visited Lisbon during a period of armed unrest.

Margaret Sutton Briscoe died on December 16, 1941.

== Bibliography ==
- Perchance to Dream, and other stories (1892)
- Links in a Chain (1893)
- Jimty, and others (1898)
- The Sixth Sense, and other stories (1899)
- The Change of Heart: Six Love Stories (1903)
- The Image of Eve: A Romance with Alleviations (1909)
