= Jim Knipple =

American theatre director

Jim Knipple is a stage director and founding Artistic Director of the Run of the Mill Theater Company in Baltimore, MD. His productions have won several awards, including Best Production (CityPaper) and Best Experimental Production (Greater Baltimore Theater Awards). Most recently he co-founded and co-produced World Premiere Weekend, a new play festival at UC Irvine, where he directed and/or produced new plays from Neil LaBute, Erik Ehn, Charles L. Mee, Brooke Berman, Jamie Pacino, and over 30 other playwrights, in spaces as varied as traditional theaters, outdoor plazas, stairwells, and public restrooms. He graduated in June, 2009, with his MFA in Directing from the University of California, Irvine.

Baltimore/DC credits include plays at Artscape, Spotlighters, Vagabond Theater, Silver Spring Stage, the Baltimore Playwrights Festival, and Company 13, and he has thrice directed for the Maryland Young Playwrights Festival at CENTERSTAGE. West coast credits include assistant director/assistant dramaturg for Cornerstone Theater Company’s A Holtville Night’s Dream, assistant directing the world premiere of Richard Greenberg's The Injured Party at South Coast Repertory, and directing A Body of Water at Ark Theater.

One of his recent projects was with Dramatic Adventure Theater's ACTion: Ecuador, where he spent 3½ weeks in Ecuador creating an original piece that was presented in Ecuador and New York City. In October, 2009, he directed 'Fertile Ground' by Deborah Harbin, a new work commissioned by the Messiah College President's Office to celebrate the school's centennial. He received the Certificate of Merit for Excellence in Directing from The Kennedy Center American College Theater Festival for his work on 'Fertile Ground.'

Recently he collaborated with Dorea Schmidt on At Water's Edge: Confessions of an Obsessive Mind. This one woman show was presented as part of the Flying Solo Festival at Open Stage of Harrisburg in June, 2010. Other recent projects include Arsenic and Old Lace at Johns Hopkins University, Twelfth Night at Messiah College, and bobrauschenbergamerica at Loyola University Maryland, and David Mamet's Oleanna at Morgan State University.

Jim was Resident Artist and Visiting Assistant Professor of Directing & Playwriting at West Virginia University where he has directed The Liar by David Ives, adapted from the comedy by the seventeenth-century French dramatist Pierre Corneille.

== Sources ==
- http://www.jimknipple.com
- http://www.citypaper.com/arts/story.asp?id=12118
- http://www.citypaper.com/arts/story.asp?id=9899
- http://www.runofthemilltheater.org
- https://web.archive.org/web/20131119220308/http://theatre.wvu.edu/
