= Lillian Zuckerman =

American actress (1916-2004)

- Born: Lillian Fara Stein; September 16, 1916; Baltimore, Maryland, US
- Died: October 11, 2004 (aged 88); Miami, Florida, US
- Occupation: film actress
- Years active: 1972–1987

Lillian Zuckerman (born Lillian Fara Stein, September 16, 1916 – October 11, 2004) was an American actress. She was born in Baltimore, Maryland and died in Miami, Florida.

== Filmography ==
Year	Title	Role	Notes
1972	Limbo	Church Lady	Uncredited
1974	Lenny	Nightclub Patron	Uncredited
1977	Deadbeat	Beach Witness	
1981	Nobody's Perfekt	Matron	
1985	The Mean Season	Mrs. Stein	
1987	Making Mr. Right		Uncredited, (final film role)
