= Katharine Lucke =

American composer and music educator (1875–1962)

Katharine E. Lucke (1875–1962) was an American organist, music educator and composer.

Lucke graduated from Peabody Conservatory of Music in 1904. After completing her studies, she lived and worked in Baltimore, Maryland. She served as organist at the First Unitarian Church in Baltimore, and took a position as a faculty member of Peabody in 1919.

Lucke's papers are housed at Peabody.

== Works ==
Lucke composed mainly songs, sacred music, chamber music and solo compositions. Selected works include:

- A Song on the Wind, Mo Bron! by Katharine E Lucke (Music) and William Sharp (lyrics) (1947)
- My Harp of Many Strings: Sacred Song by Louise B. Brownell (lyrics) and Katharine E. Lucke (Music) (1944)
- Longing by Katharine E. Lucke (Music) and William Sharp (lyrics)
- Candles
- Allegretto, for organ
- Andante Cantabile for chamber ensemble

Some of Lucke's works are recorded and available on CD:

- Historic Organs of Baltimore (1995)
