= Adeke Rose =

American poet

Adeke Rose (born Karen Crawley-Buckholtz) is a spoken word artist and poet based in Baltimore, Maryland. She is married to David Buckholtz a.k.a. David B., a poet and musician. They have three children and two grandchildren. Crawley-Buckholtz is a psychotherapist in private practice and teaches psychology at Anne Arundel Community College. She holds a BA in Psychology from the University of Maryland, Baltimore County and an MA in Counseling psychology from Bowie State University.

Rose was named one of the Best Local Poets by CBS Baltimore in 2013.

== Published works ==
- Autobiography of a Rose (2010)
- Wounded Kings and Warrior Women; Poetry on Love, Culture and Community (2013)
- She Walks in Faith...Legs Not Required (2013)
- The Morning After (2014)
- Football and Desire (2014)
