= Ann Manley =

American brothel proprietor

- Born: c. 1828
- Died: After 1870
- Occupation: brothel proprietor
- Political party: Whig Party (????–1854); American Party (1854–????)
- Opponent: Caroline Konig
- Spouse(s): James Manley, Sr.
- Children: At least 1

Ann Manley (c. 1828 – after 1870) was an American brothel proprietor and street brawler who, with her husband James, operated a brothel in Baltimore, Maryland, in the middle 19th century. She was known for a violent disposition. She is credited with saving most of the band of the 6th Massachusetts Regiment from certain lynching in April 1861, at the outbreak of the American Civil War.

== Background ==
Manley, and her husband James, were Whigs, and later American Party, loyalists who operated a brothel on Eastern Avenue in the Fell's Point of Baltimore and were among "the most desperate characters" in the red light district. James Manley was a party "rough", responsible for harassing and attacking Democrats, and intimidating voters on election day; he was associated with the party's street enforcers, the Plug Uglies. His political connections helped him secure patronage jobs, including a long stint of service as a city night watchman. This was despite his having been arrested at least once for beating Ann. Ann herself had been arrested on at least one occasion for severely beating one of her prostitutes and was known to have a penchant for brawling. (Note: With the collapse of the Whig Party, the Manleys had become Know Nothings, though it is unclear if they ultimately realigned to the Republican Party.) According to a period report in The Baltimore Sun, Ann Manley was also arrested in 1852 after attacking a police officer who was "beaten very severely, having been struck repeatedly".

On May 8, 1850, James and Ann, while on a stroll, passed the house of the local Democratic boss, George Konig. (Note: Konig was also the father of United States Congressman George Konig, Jr.) Upon seeing Konig's wife, Caroline, standing on the porch, James told Ann to beat the "damn bitch". Konig appeared and intervened. James returned later and shot Konig in the chest; the wounds were serious but non-fatal. As soon as Konig had recovered, a Plug Uglies gang under James's command unsuccessfully made another attempt to murder him. In 1853 James was convicted of attempted murder for the 1850 shooting and sentenced to six years in prison. Fortunately for him, in 1857 fellow Know Nothing Thomas Holliday Hicks was inaugurated Governor of Maryland and promptly pardoned him. Despite George Konig and James Manley's occasional attempts to murder each other, they appeared to view their rivalry as professional and Konig even wrote a letter in support of Manley's pardon.

== Rescue of the 6th Mass. band ==
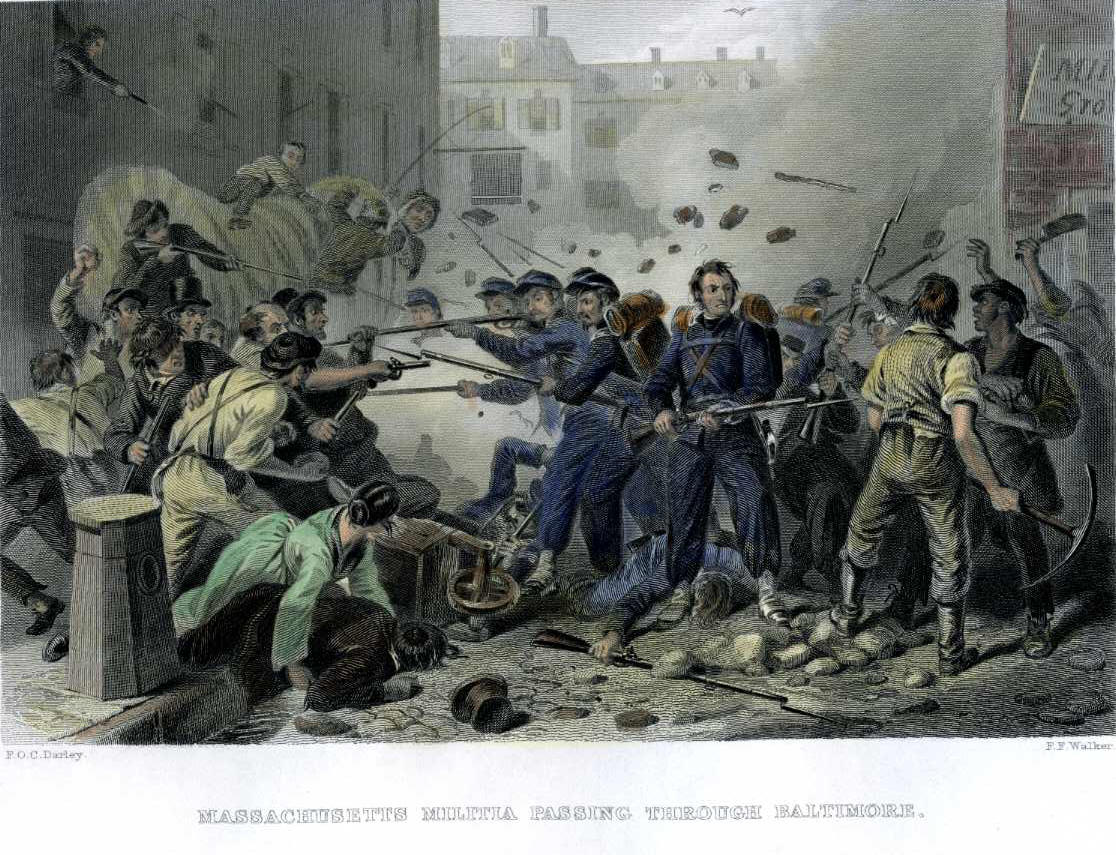
The 6th Massachusetts Regiment fights its way through Baltimore.

On April 19, 1861, the 6th Massachusetts Volunteer Regiment arrived via train in Baltimore en route to Washington, D.C., where it had been called to fortify the city against what was believed to be impending attack by the Confederate States. The main body of the 6th Massachusetts proceeded out from the President Street Station on foot to make a connecting train at Canton Depot, temporarily leaving its 24-piece band posted at the first station. As the regiment entered downtown Baltimore it was beset by Baltimoreans, outraged at the presence of Massachusetts troops in Maryland, and had to fight its way through the city, during the course of which at least three soldiers were stoned to death, one soldier was dragged to the sidewalk and beaten to death, and many more were injured from gunfire directed at them from rooftops. Part of the mob, upon learning that the regimental band remained at the President Street Station, ended its attacks and returned to the station. This faction was led by Konig and it began stoning the railway car in which the bandsmen were waiting, injuring several. At this point the unit separated in two and fled the station, each element pursued by Konig's men. The first group was rescued by the Baltimore Police while the second became lost in the maze of streets and alleys of Fell's Point.

A "rough looking man" intercepted the fleeing bandsmen and yelled either "Follow me" or "This way, this way, boys." The soldiers followed the man up a narrow side alley to the Manley brothel where Manley hurried each inside before bolting the front door. Manley personally carried one bandsman, who was bleeding from a head wound, to the relative safety of the second floor of the building. There, she dressed the soldiers' wounds and fed them "at her own cost". For reasons unclear, Manley had a large collection of men's clothing and the soldiers used it to disguise themselves so that they could later safely travel through Baltimore. Upon returning to the train station they found the bodies of two bandsmen who had been separated from the main group and lynched. Manley forwarded the soldiers' uniforms and instruments, which they had left at her brothel, to the train station and the surviving members of the band took the next train to Philadelphia.

== Personal life ==
With James Manley, Ann Manley had at least one son, also named James.

== Legacy ==
In Elizabeth Cady Stanton's book History of Woman Suffrage, Manley is compared to Mary Magdalene, "with a pity as divine as that of the woman who anointed the feet of our Lord and wiped them with the hair of her head".
