= Jerry Turner (anchorman) =

American television news anchor (1929-1987)

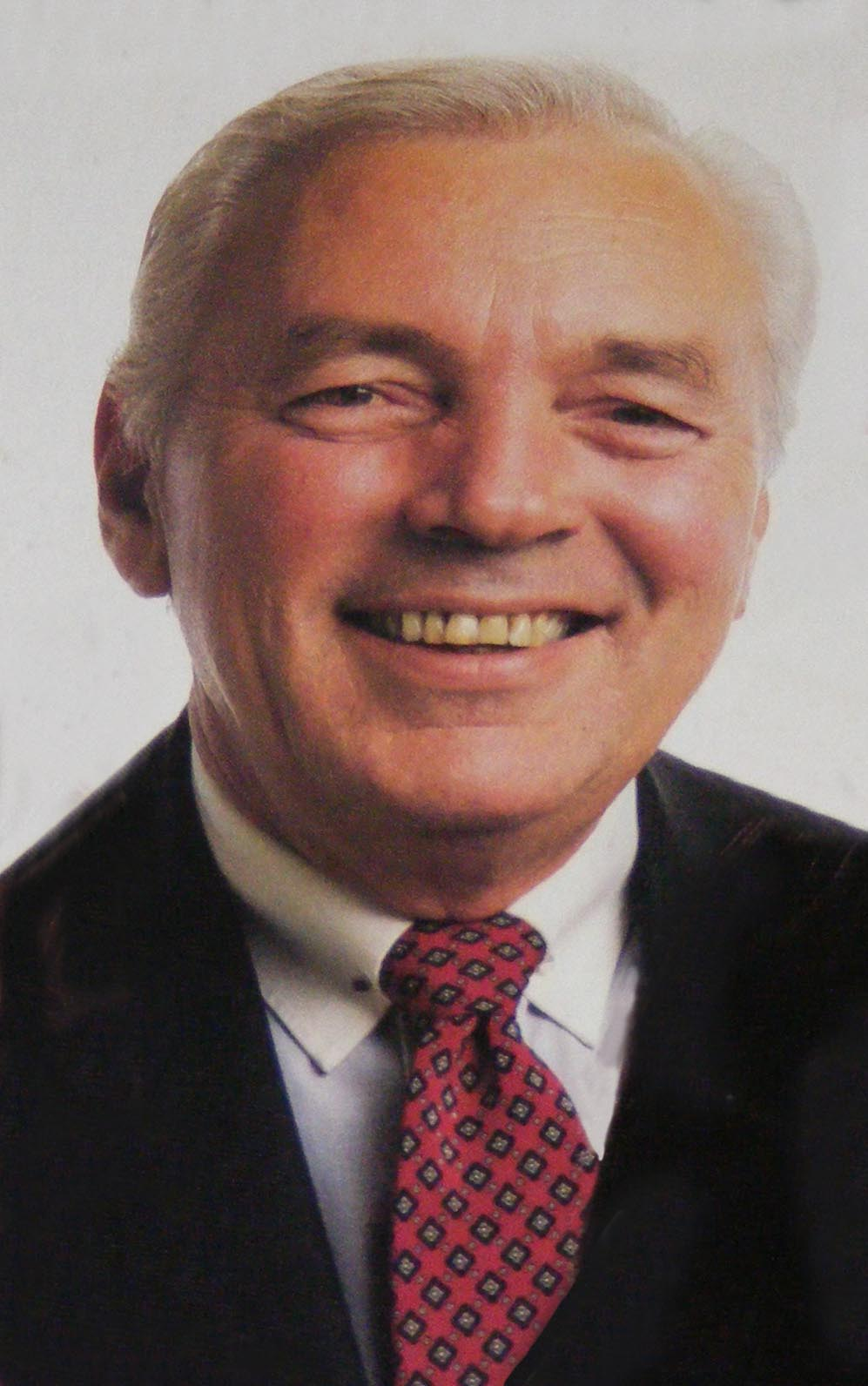
- Born: Jerry Jackson Joiner; August 6, 1929; Meridian, Mississippi, U.S.
- Died: December 31, 1987 (aged 58); Baltimore, Maryland, U.S.
- Resting place: Rose Hill Cemetery; Marion, South Carolina, U.S.
- Occupation: anchorman
- Notable credit(s): Co-anchor of WJZ-TV, Eyewitness News
- Spouse: Jean McIntyre (m. 1952)

Jerry Jackson Joiner (August 6, 1929 – December 31, 1987), known professionally as Jerry Turner, was an American television news anchorman at WJZ-TV in Baltimore, Maryland.

== Biography ==
Jerry Joiner was from Meridian, Mississippi and began working at the Baltimore television station in August 1962, starting the 6PM Newscast with Al Sanders in 1977.

Prior to his arrival on Television Hill, WJZ's news was mired in third place in a town that had three major network newscasts. In 1971, WBAL-TV was #1, WMAR-TV was #2; three years later, WJZ with Turner, Sanders, Bob Turk (weather) and Nick Charles (Sports) was a runaway #1 and stayed there through the 70s and into the 80s.

Turner worked with Oprah Winfrey when she moved to Baltimore in 1976 to co-anchor the 6PM news.

== Illness and death ==
A resident of Lutherville, Maryland, Turner was diagnosed esophageal cancer in December 1986. He underwent a series of radiation and chemotherapy treatments and returned to the air in June 1987. He left the newscast in mid-December 1987 when his health deteriorated and died at Johns Hopkins Hospital in Baltimore on December 31, 1987, at 7:15 PM. His funeral was held at Towson Presbyterian Church. He was buried at Rose Hill Cemetery in Marion, South Carolina.

== Legacy ==
Each year, the Baltimore Community Foundation awards college scholarships in the name of Jerry Turner for students who are interested in broadcast journalism. Several memorial discussion programs were broadcast on Channel 13 in the following week examining his legacy and a half hour televised review of his life and career was repeated several times.

Preceded by George Baumann	WJZ-TV Lead Anchors; 1962 – 1987	Succeeded by Al Sanders
