= Wade Whitney =

American soccer player

Personal information
- Full name: Wade Jason Whitney
- Date of birth: December 13, 1967 (age 58)
- Place of birth: Baltimore, Maryland, United States
- Height: 5 ft 11 in (1.80 m)
- Positions: Midfielder; defender

Youth career
- 1985–1988: North Carolina State University

Senior career*
Years	Team	Apps	(Gls)
1989–1992	Raleigh United		(? ?)
1993–1994,1996–1998	Raleigh Flyers		(? ?)
- * Club domestic league appearances and goals

Wade Whitney (born December 13, 1967, in Baltimore, Maryland) is a retired American soccer right-sided defender and midfielder who was a former All-American representing Columbia, Maryland.

== Youth ==
Whitney grew up in Columbia, Maryland, where he attended Hammond High School. He was a 1985 Parade Magazine All-American from Parade magazine and NSCAA in 1984–85. After his youth career with Region I and US Youth Soccer Olympic Development Program he went on to attend North Carolina State University. In his four years at State, Whitney played alongside Tab Ramos, Dario Brose and Henry Gutierrez, finishing his career with the Wolfpack as captain in 1988.

== Raleigh Flyers ==
Whitney was part of the inaugural season of the Flyers in 1993 after playing for Raleigh United from 1990 to 1992. He played midfielder and a right-sided wingback with the Raleigh Flyers in 1993, 1994, 1996, 1997 and 1998.

== Coaching ==
Whitney was a select team coach and technical director for Capital Area Soccer League in Raleigh, North Carolina, in 1998 and 1999. In 2000, he was the director of marketing for the Raleigh Wings.

== Current ==
Whitney resides in Maryland.
