= Richard Sher (newscaster) =

American television journalist (born 1941)

Richard Sher is a longtime newscaster in Baltimore, Maryland, who spent most of his career at WJZ-TV.

== Early life ==
Richard Sher was born in 1941 to Michael and Lillian Sher at the Women's Hospital in Bolton Hill. He grew up in Northwest Baltimore and attended the St. Paul's School in Baltimore County, where he was "one of the few Jews." Sher received his undergraduate degree in 1963 and his Master of Arts degree in Communications in 1965 from the University of Maryland, College Park.

== Broadcasting career ==
Before arriving at WJZ, Sher was news director for WBAL-FM Radio (WBAL-FM "News 98" became WIYY / 98 Rock in 1975), where he established an all news format for the station. He has also worked in San Francisco and Washington, D.C.

Sher joined WJZ in 1975. From 1988 through February 1995, he co-anchored the weekend newscasts, and he was then the co-anchor of Eyewitness News at Five until January 1998. He also hosted a local talk show, People Are Talking, with Oprah Winfrey in the beginning of her career.

Sher played a broadcaster in a cameo role in the 2006 Robin Williams movie Man of the Year.

Sher retired from WJZ on November 24, 2008, after 33 years there. His retirement announcement was pre-empted by his friend and former colleague Winfrey, who introduced him to her audience and informed them of Sher's impending retirement.

== After WJZ ==
After retiring from WJZ, Sher's presence on the Baltimore airwaves endured. His Sunday morning public affairs forum Square Off, which he had hosted for many years on WJZ, continued on WMAR-TV.

In 2015, Sher began hosting a game show at the Horseshoe Casino in Baltimore. The show was named People Are Winning, as "a nod to People Are Talking, the long-running morning show that Sher hosted on WJZ-TV." He volunteers weekly at Maryland's R Adams Cowley Shock Trauma Center.

== Sources ==
- Richard Sher leaving WJZ-TV - Baltimore Business Journal, Mon. Nov. 24, 2008
- From TV to Shock Trauma, Richard Sher takes on new role as hospital volunteer -- ABC 2 NEWS WMAR Baltimore, Sunday Sept 18, 2011
