= Jerome H. Joyce =

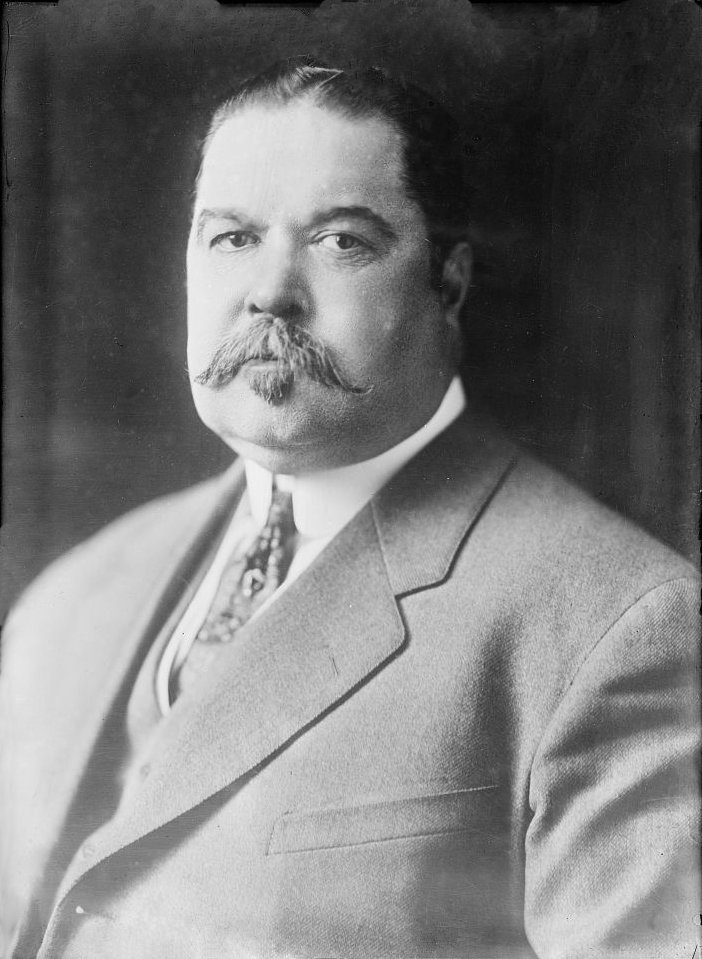

Jerome H. Joyce, Sr. (1865 – March 15, 1924) was president of the Aero Club of Baltimore and owner of the Hotel Joyce.

== Biography ==
Joyce was born in 1865. His father, Eugene Joyce, founded the Hotel Joyce and was a member of the Maryland state legislature, and later a judge on the Baltimore City Tax Appeals Court. Jerome Joyce grew up working in the hotel and attended Calvert Hall College High School and Loyola College (now Loyola University Maryland). After graduating from Loyola in 1882, he worked as a stock clerk at Hodges Brothers, which was owned by former Baltimore Mayor James Hodges, before moving to New York City to take a position at Sylvester, Hilton & Company. Joyce returned to Baltimore to take over management of the Hotel Joyce, which he inherited upon his father's death. He was active in hotel trade associations, serving as the president of the Maryland Hotel Men's Association and as the president of the National Hotel Men's Benefit Association.

Joyce was very active in Baltimore's political and civic circles in the 1900s and 1910s, and was known as an avid promoter of the city for events and conventions. He played major roles planning the 1912 Democratic National Convention, The Star-Spangled Banner Centennial celebration in 1914, and the Jubilee Parade celebrating the recovery of Baltimore from the Great Fire in 1906. Joyce was an early aviation enthusiast, although he believed that he was personally too heavy for flying, and served as the president of the Aero Club of Baltimore. He proposed and was the primary planner for the Baltimore Aero Meet in 1910, in which Hubert Latham became the first pilot to fly over an American city by a planned route.

Joyce heavily involved in the Democratic Party and the Hotel Joyce served as an unofficial headquarters for the party in Baltimore. He was appointed a Colonel in the Maryland State Militia by Governor Austin Lane Crothers and was an aide-de-camp to the Governor's Staff.

Joyce died in 1924 of diabetes in St. Agnes Hospital. His son, Jerome H. Joyce, Jr, took over ownership of the Hotel Joyce, which was purchased by the City of Baltimore and demolished in 1973 to help make way for the Inner Harbor Renewal Project. The Hilton Baltimore was built at the location of the Hotel Joyce.
