= Ferdinand Durang =

American actor

Ferdinand Durang (c. 1785 – 1831) was an American actor, best known as the first person to sing publicly Francis Scott Key's "The Star-Spangled Banner".

He was born in Baltimore, Maryland, the son of John Durang of Lancaster, Pennsylvania, America's first native-born actor. He served in the Pennsylvania militia. It is disputed whether he actually matched Key's poem with the tune of "To Anacreon in Heaven", a popular drinking song, but he is generally recognized as the first person to publicly sing it, at Captain McCauley's tavern in Baltimore in October 1814. He was a member of the Bowery Theatre Company. He died in 1831.
