= List of The Hill School alumni =

The following is a list of notable alumni and faculty of The Hill School, a preparatory boarding school located in Pottstown, Pennsylvania.

== A ==
- William Arrowsmith, 1941 – professor
- Malcolm Atterbury, 1926 – actor

== B ==
- John Backus, 1942 – computer scientist; inventor of the FORTRAN computer language
- James Baker III, 1948 – secretary of state, U.S. secretary of the treasury
- Chris Bala, 1997 – professional ice hockey player
- Perry Richardson Bass – investor and philanthropist
- Cleve Benedict, 1953 – West Virginian congressman
- Pinckney Benedict, 1982 – screenwriter and author
- George Packer Berry – dean of Harvard Medical School
- Manoj Bhargava, 1972 – inventor of 5-hour Energy
- Frank S. Bissell - head wrestling coach 1947-73
- Curtis Bok, 1915 – Pennsylvania Supreme Court justice
- William Whiting Borden – missionary, heir of Borden fortune
- George Bradley – poet
- Hans Brase, 2012 – German basketball player
- Josiah Bunting III, 1957 – educator, superintendent of the Virginia Military Institute
- Irving T. Bush – businessman

== C ==
- Robert Davis Carey, 1896 – governor and senator from Wyoming
- John Dickson Carr, 1925 – author
- Sabin Carr, 1924 – Olympic athlete
- Bernard Chan, 1983 – Hong Kong politician and businessman
- Evans Clark (1888–1970) – writer committed first to Communist and Socialist causes and then liberal socio-economic issues
- Jay Clayton
- William F. Clinger, 1947 – former congressman from Pennsylvania, 1979–97, US Navy (1951–55, lt.)
- Henry S. Coleman, c. 1944 – educator
- Chris Collingwood, 1985 – singer, songwriter, member of rock band Fountains of Wayne
- Paul Collins, 1986 – historian and memoirist
- Seward Collins – distributist, anti-modernist
- James Cromwell, 1958 – Academy Award-nominated television and film actor
- Briggs Cunningham, 1926 – sportsman, motor enthusiast; won America's Cup yacht race in 1958

== D ==
- Hugh DeHaven, 1914 – professor at Cornell University and "father of crash survivability"
- Kingman Douglass, 1914 – investment banker; deputy director of CIA
- Jack G. Downing, 1958 – director of the National Clandestine Service under President Bill Clinton

== E ==
- Lincoln Ellsworth, 1919 – polar explorer, first to sight geographic North Pole along with explorer Roald Amundsen
- German Horton Hunt Emory
- Brett Eppehimer – professional basketball player
- Nick Eppehimer – professional basketball player

== F ==
- John Heaphy Fellowes, 1951 – U.S. Navy captain, pilot, and POW during the Vietnam War
- Morton Fetterolf – Pennsylvania state senator
- Clarence Fincke – captain of Yale football team, Hill football coach
- William Fincke – pacifist minister
- Leonard Firestone, 1927 – U.S. ambassador to Belgium, 1974–77, US Navy (WWII, lt.)
- Walter Forbes, 1961 – fraudulent executive
- Wilson P. Foss Jr., 1910 – board chair New York Trap Rock Corporation, art dealer and collector of Asian art
- Harold Furth, 1947 – scientist

== G ==
- George Garrett, 1941 – poet, novelist, educator
- Caleb Frank Gates, 1922 – chancellor of the University of Denver
- Chris Gebhard, 1992 – business owner, Pennsylvania state senator
- Wolcott Gibbs, class of '20 but did not graduate – writer for The New Yorker
- S. C. Gwynne, 1970 – bestselling author, Pulitzer Prize finalist

== H ==
- Harry Hamlin, 1970 – actor
- Dick Harter, 1948 – assistant coach of the Philadelphia 76ers
- Laning Harvey, 1903 – Pennsylvania state senator
- E. William Henry, 1947 – chairman of FCC
- Frederick Herreshoff, 1904 – amateur golfer
- Ralph Hills, 1921 – Olympic shot putter, physician
- Mahlon Hoagland, 1940 – discoverer of transfer RNA
- Randy Hopper, 1985 – Wisconsin state senator
- Roger Horchow, 1945 – Tony Award-winning Broadway producer
- Sam Horner, 1956 – NFL halfback, defensive back and punter
- Clark Hoyt, 1960 – Pulitzer Prize-winning journalist
- James Calhoun Humes, 1952 – speechwriter
- Lamar Hunt, 1951 – businessman
- Nelson Bunker Hunt, did not graduate – scion of the Hunt Oil Company family; donated the costs to renovate his namesake building on campus
- Thad Hutcheson, 1933 – politician

== J ==
- Alexander Jerrems

== K ==
- Theo Killion – CEO 2010–14, led the failing Zale Corporation back from near-bankruptcy
- Eric King – NFL player
- Bob Kudelski, 1983 – professional ice hockey player, 1994 NHL All Star

== L ==
- Lewis Lehrman, 1956 – politician, businessman, author
- Josiah K. Lilly Jr.
- Steven Lisberger – film director and producer, directed Tron
- Robert A. Lovett, 1914 – fourth United States secretary of defense
- Bill Luders – notable naval architect

== M ==
- Charles William Mayo
- Alberto Mestre, 1982 – Olympian swimmer
- James A. Michener, 1931 – author; faculty, department of English
- Devereux Milburn – Big Four polo player
- Spencer Moseley – CEO of Railway Express Agency

== P ==
- Frank Pace, 1929 – secretary of the Army; CEO of General Dynamics
- Alan J. Pakula, 1944 – Hollywood director and producer
- Edward E. Paramore Jr. – screenwriter
- David Paton – founder of Orbis International
- George Patton IV, 1942 – major general in the United States Army; son of World War II General George Patton
- Norman Pearlstine, 1960 – a former top editor at The Wall Street Journal, Time Inc., Bloomberg L.P. and The Los Angeles Times
- Lionel Pincus, 1948 – co-founder of Warburg Pincus
- William Porter, 1944 – Olympic athlete
- Winston L. Prouty, 1924 – U.S. senator from Vermont (1959–1971)
- William Proxmire, 1934 – U.S. senator from Wisconsin (D)
- Stephen Puth – singer; brother of Charlie Puth

== Q ==
- William Thomas Quick, 1964 – novelist, screenwriter, blogger. Named the Blogosphere.

== R ==
- Parviz C. Raji – Iranian diplomat
- William S. Reyburn – congressman for Pennsylvania
- Pat Rissmiller, 1998 – NHL athlete
- Robert F. Rockwell, 1903 – United States congressman from Colorado
- William A. Roosma – U.S. Army major general
- Peter Rummell, CEO of St. Joe Company
- Frank Runyeon, 1971 – actor, two-time Emmy Award winner
- Marshall Rutter – lawyer, arts patron, co-founder of the Los Angeles Master Chorale

== S ==
- Len Sassaman, 1998 – computer scientist and biohacker; candidate for Satoshi
- Peter Schaffer, 1980 – lawyer and sports agent
- Barry Sheen, 1937 – British judge
- Tom Shevlin, 1902 -- Yale track athlete, football captain, and lumberman
- Jon Shirley, 1956 – former president of Microsoft
- Ernest Simpson, 1915 – British shipping tycoon best known as the second husband of Wallis Simpson, who later married the former Edward VIII of the United Kingdom, elder brother of George VI
- Kenneth F. Simpson – congressman
- Lane Smith, attended in 1955, did not graduate – character actor
- Stephen Sohn, 2005 – Korean-American model
- Jerry Stahl, 1971 – novelist, screenwriter
- David Stein, 1979 – radio personality
- Oliver Stone, 1964 – Academy Award-winning producer/director
- Daniel Willard Streeter – hunter, adventurer and author
- William Irvin Swoope, 1888 – United States congressman from Pennsylvania

== T ==
- Harold E. Talbott, 1907 – aviator and president of the Dayton-Wright Company, which manufactured more wartime aircraft overall than any other U.S. plant; third United States Secretary of the Air Force; selected the permanent site for United States Air Force Academy
- Baird Tipson, 1961 – former president of Washington College
- Kevin Tkachuk – professional rugby player; faculty, department of History
- Franchot Tone, Class of 1923, but did not graduate – prominent, Oscar-nominated actor of stage, film and television productions
- Roswell Tripp
- Juan T. Trippe, 1917 – airline pioneer, founder of Pan Am
- Bobby Troup – composer of "Route 66", musician, composer, jazz authority, recording artist, actor, Emmy Award winner
- Donald Trump Jr., 1996 – son of Donald Trump
- Eric Trump, 2002 – son of Donald Trump; Hill board of trustees

== U ==
- David Vogel Uihlein, Sr. – heir to the Joseph Schlitz Brewing Company

== V ==
- Butch van Breda Kolff – professional basketball player and coach in the NBA
- John Van Voorhis, 1919 – New York Supreme Court judge

== W ==
- John M. Walker, 1927 – physician and investment banker
- Irving Price Wanger – congressman
- Douglas "Sandy" A. Warner III, 1964 – former CEO of J. P. Morgan & Co.
- Laurence Hawley Watres, 1900 – U.S. congressman from Pennsylvania
- Harry Elkins Widener, 1902 – businessman; son of wealthy businessman George Dunton Widener; grandson of wealthy railroad tycoon Peter A.B. Widener; two buildings donated in his name
- Edmund Wilson, 1912 – writer
- Tom Wolf, 1967 – 47th governor of Pennsylvania (2015–2023)
- Tobias Wolff, Class of 1964, but was expelled for forging information for admission – writer, novelist, English and writing professor at Stanford
- Sidney Wood – Wimbledon tennis champion
- Benjamin Drake Wright

== Y ==
- Richard Yuengling Sr., 1933 – president of Yuengling Brewery
