= Craig Wadsworth =

Diplomat, rider, Rough Rider, Craig W. Wadsworth

Craig Wharton Wadsworth
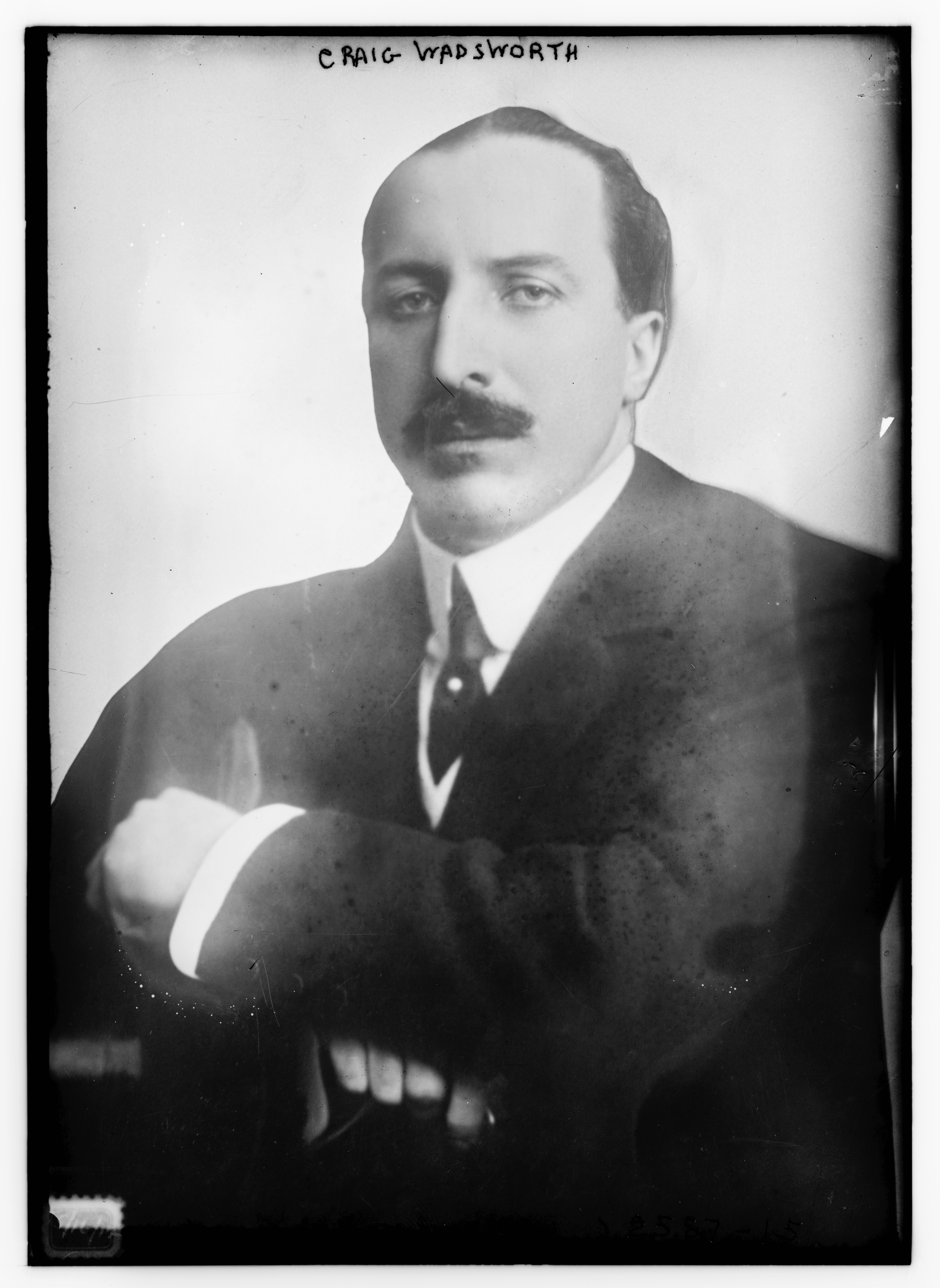
- Craig Wadsworth
- Born: January 12, 1872; Philadelphia, Pennsylvania, United States
- Died: May 20, 1960 (aged 88); Geneseo, New York, U.S.
- Resting place: Temple Hill Cemetery, Geneseo, New York
- Education: Harvard University
- Known for: Diplomat, member of Roosevelt's Rough Riders
- Relatives: James Wadsworth (grandfather); James W. Wadsworth (uncle); Cornelia W. Adair (aunt); James Wadsworth Jr. (cousin)

Craig Wharton Wadsworth (January 12, 1872 – May 20, 1960) was a diplomat, steeplechase rider, and member of Theodore Roosevelt's Rough Riders.

== Early life ==
Wadsworth was born in Philadelphia to Gen. Craig Wadsworth and Evelyn Willing (née Peters) Wadsworth. His elder brother was James S. Wadsworth (1870–1930).

His grandfather was Civil War General James S. Wadsworth, his uncle was James Wolcott Wadsworth, and his aunts were Cornelia Wadsworth Ritchie Adair, who became prominent as the matriarch of Glenveagh Castle in County Donegal, Ireland, and the large JA Ranch in the Texas Panhandle, and Elizabeth S. Wadsworth, who was married to Arthur Smith-Barry, 1st Baron Barrymore, becoming Lady Barrymore.

He attended school at The Hill School at Pottstown, Pennsylvania. He studied at Harvard University in 1892 and was a member of the university's varsity football team.

== Career ==
He was an amateur steeplechase rider and prominent member of New York Society. In 1900, he purchased the horses Banastar (for $11,000), Lucky Bird ($2,600), and Seminole ($3,000) and from the estate of William H. Clark.

He served in Cuba during the Spanish–American War where he served in Troop K of Theodore Roosevelt's Rough Riders in 1898. After the war, he served on Governor Theodore Roosevelt's military staff as a major in Albany, New York.

In 1902, he started in the U.S. Diplomatic Service as third secretary to the American Embassy in London, taking up his position there in August that year, and succeeding William Corcoran Eustis. In 1907, during the murder trial of society architect Stanford White, there were accusations of impropriety made against Wadsworth by Evelyn Nesbit Thaw, the wife of Harry Kendall Thaw. Evelyn claimed that Wadsworth entered her mother's room in London and insulted her and her mother. Wadsworth vehemently denied the accusations against him.

He then served as Consul General at Tehran, Persia; Bucharest, Romania; Montevideo, Uruguay; Buenos Aires, Argentina; Rio de Janeiro, Brazil; Brussels, Belgium; and Lima, Peru.

Wadsworth retired in 1927 and moved back to his family's estate in Geneseo, New York.

== Personal life ==
Wadsworth was a member of the Knickerbocker Club, the Jockey Club, the Union Club, the Lambs Club, and the Racquet Club of New York City, the Metropolitan Club of Washington, D.C. and the Roehampton Club, the Beefsteak Club, and St James's Club, of London.

Wadsworth died at his home in Geneseo on May 20, 1960, and is buried in Temple Hill Cemetery in Geneseo, New York.

== In popular culture ==
Wadsworth was portrayed by Chris Noth in the 1997 TV movie Rough Riders.

== See also ==
- List of Harvard University people
- List of people from New York
- List of The Hill School alumni
