= German Horton Hunt Emory =

American lawyer

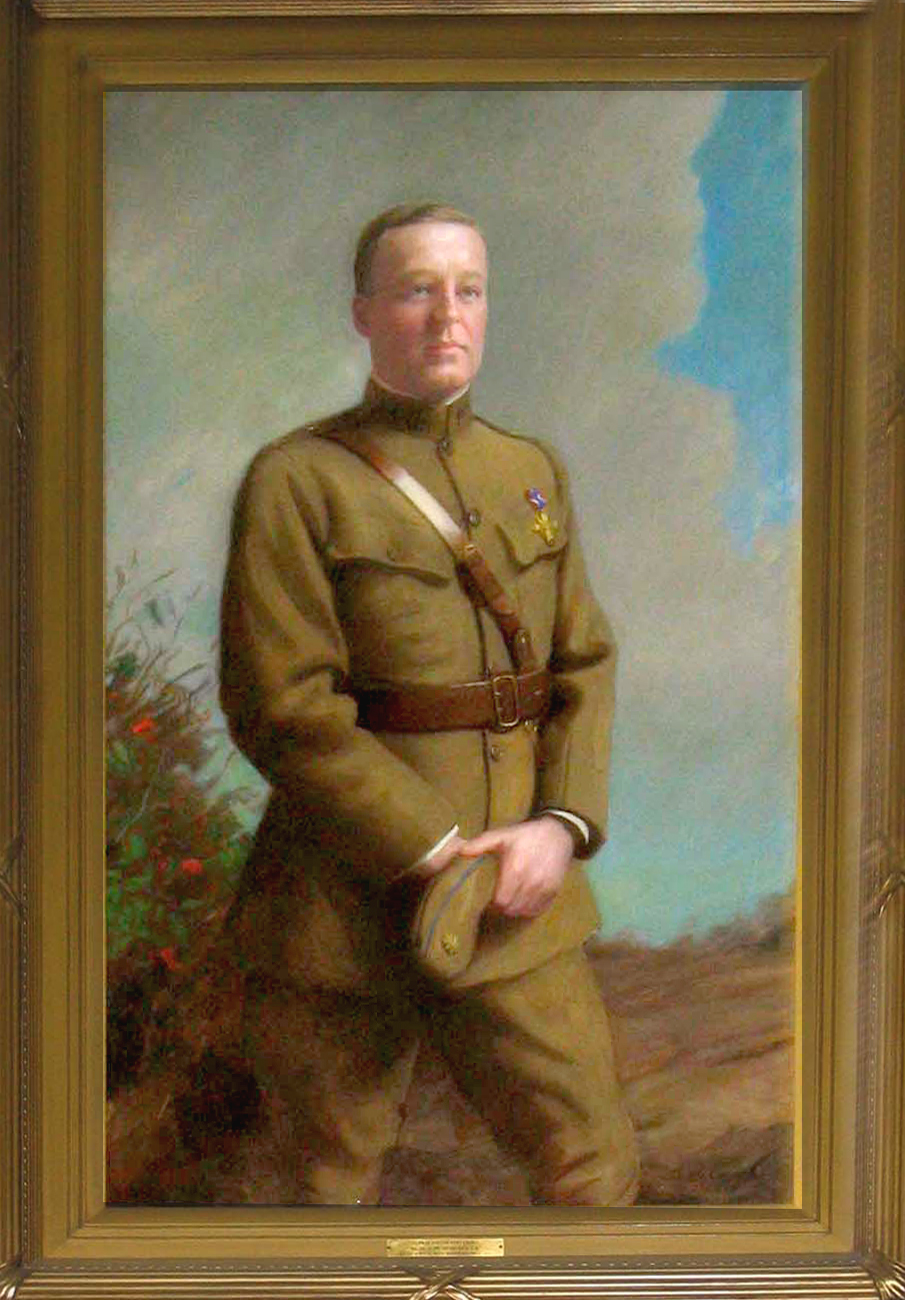
A posthumous oil painting of Emory by Thomas Cromwell Corner resides in Courtroom 226 of the Clarence M. Mitchell Jr. Courthouse in Baltimore.

German H.H. Emory (1882–1918) was a prominent American lawyer and soldier from Baltimore. He was awarded the Distinguished Service Cross "for extraordinary heroism in action while serving with the 3rd Battalion, 320th Infantry Regiment, 80th Division, American Expeditionary Forces, near Sommerance, France November 1, 1918." He was killed in action in the Meuse-Argonne Offensive, in the waning days of World War I. He is commemorated with a memorial painting and two memorial sculptures in Maryland courthouses.

== Birth and education ==
German H.H. Emory was born on September 27, 1882, in Murner's Branch, Allegany County, Maryland. His father, William Hopper Emory (1849–1908), was an insurance broker. His mother was Eleanor Louisa Hunt (1851–1927). He grew up at 1403 West Lanvale Street in Baltimore, which is now the site of Harlem Park Middle School. The Emory Family has deep roots on the Eastern Shore of Maryland. Arthur Emory, Sr. (c. 1640-1699) arrived in Maryland in the 1660s. In 1667 he is reputed to have received from Lord Baltimore several land grants on the Wye, Choptank, and Chester rivers on the Eastern Shore of the Chesapeake Bay. The Poplar Grove Plantation, near Centreville, Maryland, is the ancestral home of the Emorys. It lies on Spaniard Neck, a peninsula on the south side of the Chester River in Queen Anne's County, just above the mouth of the Corsica River. Today the C.V. Starr Center for the Study of the American Experience is overseeing the Poplar Grove Project, an ongoing exploration of the Emory family's papers, in conjunction with the Maryland State Archives. To date, over 28,406 documents have been recovered and scanned. The Emory family produced two celebrated military men in the 19th century: Col. Thomas Emory, (1782-1842), and one of his sons, General William H. Emory.

German was named after his maternal grandfather, German Horton Hunt (1828–1907), a leading Baltimore manufacturer of the 19th century, whose Poole and Hunt Engineering and Machine Company produced machinery and castings for a worldwide market from 1853 to 1889. Emory was educated in Baltimore, at The Hill School, near Pottstown, Pennsylvania, and at St. Luke's School in Philadelphia. He then entered the University of Maryland School of Law, the second oldest law school in the country. While there he joined the Eta chapter of Phi Sigma Kappa, a social fraternity, and became the 51st member to sign the Eta Chapter Roll. Graduating from the law school earlier than others, he was forced to wait until his twenty-first birthday to be admitted to the Maryland Bar in 1903.

== Marriage and family ==
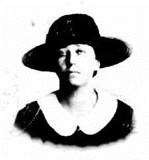
The Major's wife, Lucy Stump Emory, lived for another 60 years after her husband was killed. She saw her three sons grow up, get married and give her 10 grandchildren. She never remarried. Her unmarried sister, May Goldsborough Stump, lived with her sister, Lucy, for 50 years until May's death in 1967.

Emory married Lucy Imogen Stump (1883–1978) on June 15, 1907, in Baltimore. Lucy was also from Baltimore.

The Stump Family had been in Maryland since Colonial times, and were active in the Susquehanna River area, Western Maryland, and Baltimore in milling, mining, and banking. They also birthed a Confederate Brigadier General, James J. Archer.

One of Lucy's three sisters, Anna Abell Stump, married William Lee Rawls, "one of the most prominent attorneys in Baltimore", and gave birth to five sons, including philosopher John Rawls.

German and Lucy had three boys. Their oldest son, German H. H. Emory Jr., became the president of the Riegel Textile Company in New York City German and Lucy's second son, Richard Woollen Emory, followed his father into the law and practiced for many years in Maryland at Venable, Baetjer and Howard in Baltimore. The major's third son, Morris Soper Emory, was named after Judge Soper, and worked in the insurance business and lived in Philadelphia most of his life.

Lucy Emory remained a widow for 60 years until her death in 1978.

== Practice of law ==
Emory began the practice of law with the firm of Slingluff & Slingluff from 1903 to 1906, moving to private practice from 1906 to 1907. In 1908, Emory became a principal in the law firm of Johnson, Emory, Olmstead and Cator. During this period, in 1910, he also served as Assistant City Solicitor for Baltimore City, serving under Edgar Allan Poe, the second cousin of the famous American writer. In 1911, Emory formed a partnership with Morris A. Soper, who would soon become the chief judge of the Supreme Bench of Baltimore City. When Judge Soper ascended to the bench in 1913, Emory made the final change of his legal career, becoming a member of the firm of Frank, Emory & Beeuwkes. On January 8, 1919, The Supreme Bench of Baltimore held memorial proceedings for the six Baltimore lawyers killed in the First World War. Asked to speak about German Emory was Albert Cabell Ritchie, then the attorney general of Maryland, and soon to become the longest-serving governor in Maryland's history. Mr. Ritchie reflected in part, "Emory's knowledge of the law was broad. His advice was sound. His trial practice, at nisi prius and in the appellate courts, was very large. He was a born lawyer, broadened and developed by constant study and application and by tireless industry." In his speech about German Emory at another memorial service held in 1933 for the Six Members of the Baltimore Bar who were killed in the First World War, organized by the German H.H. Emory Post of the American Legion and held in the Baltimore City Courtroom, Chief Judge Samuel K. Dennis, of the Supreme Bench of Baltimore recollected, "Emory was an especially gifted lawyer. Ready, suave, cool, democratic and magnetic, he captured courts and juries, made converts to his cause. He loved his profession and was signally successful in it. He was considered one of the best trial lawyers in the city. Business also engaged Emory in 1914 as vice-president of Poole Engineering and Machine Company, his grandfather's old enterprise. During this period the Poole Company made, among other products, coastal defense artillery mountings and base rings for battleship turret guns in its Hampden/Woodberry facilities. They also established a rural ammunition loading works outside the city in Texas, Maryland. Emory was offered the Democratic nomination for Judge of the Supreme Court in 1917. He had entertained for several years an ambition to go on the bench, but he declined to become a candidate, saying to the lawyers who called on him offering their political support that he intended to enter the U.S. Army. He had applied for acceptance to the first Officer's Camp at Fort Myer, Virginia, in order to participate in the training that would take him to a position of leadership in the U.S. Army.

== Military career ==
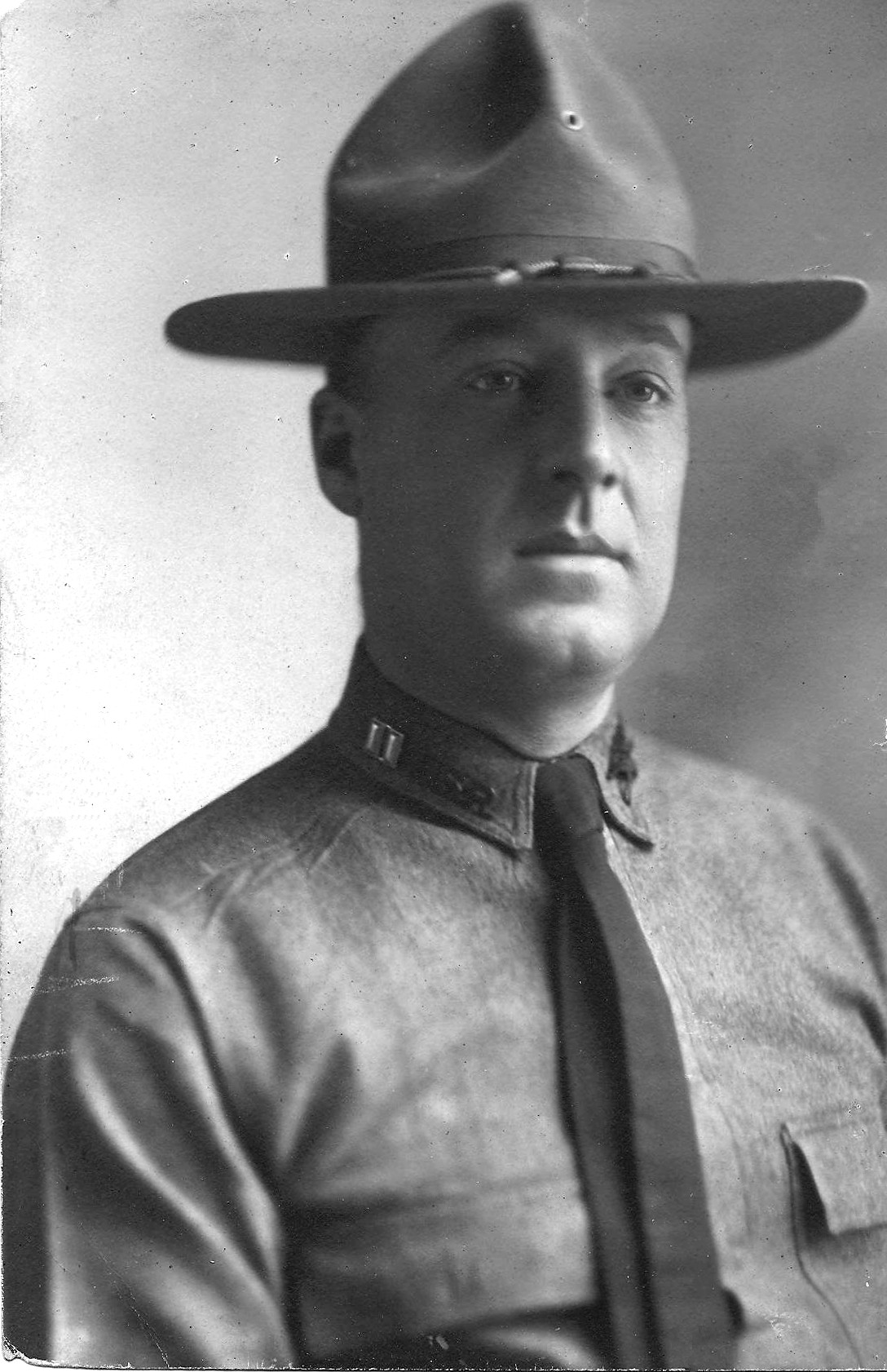
On March 7, 1918, Captain Emory was promoted to Major and placed in command of the Third Battalion, 320th Infantry Regiment, attached to the 80th Division of the American Expeditionary Forces.

Emory was a strong advocate of America's entrance into the war. In April of 1917, Emory was present at the Capital when President Wilson went to Congress to ask for a declaration of war. Emory contended that it was his duty to fight for the principles that he upheld, and he was one of the first Marylanders to volunteer. Captain Thomas H. Westlake, of Cleveland, said, "Emory had something unusual in him because of the fact that he had volunteered at the age of almost 40, with a wife and three children dependent upon him." Emory's explanation was, "My country was my idol! To it I sacrificed every selfish, every endearing sentiment."

=== Fort Myer and Fort Lee ===
While at Fort Myer, Virginia Emory acted as a correspondent for the Baltimore Sun. His series of five articles, entitled "Reports from a Rookie" and carrying his byline, appeared from time to time in the Sun, and explained many details of camp life and the rigors of military training of the day. In his first such report, published on May 20, 1917, Emory wrote, "One coming to camp is struck, instantly, by the type of men Uncle Sam has taken under his care for the next three months, and to whom he will entrust the training of the first army of 500,000. There are quite a number of men between the ages of 30 and 40, but the great majority are from 20 to 30. They are all fine, upstanding fellows, and most of them have had college educations. Many of the men are married and many were doing well in civil life before coming here. They fully appreciated what it would mean for a man to leave his family, friends and business for an indefinite period, and it makes a fellow feel proud of being an American when he glances about and thinks for a moment of the sacrifices voluntarily assumed by the 2,500 men here and the 38,000 men at the other training camps."

On May 26, in his second report, Emory wrote, "The men now know that this country will immediately begin to play a man's part in the war; that our present assistance to the Allies will be not merely money and munitions, but troops, standing shoulder to shoulder with the armies of France and England."

Major Emory was one of the few men who came out of the first officers' training camp with the rank of captain. He was subsequently ordered to Camp Lee, Virginia, where he spent nearly a year. On March 7, 1918, Captain Emory was promoted to major and placed in command of the Third Battalion, 320th Infantry Regiment, attached to the 80th Division of the American Expeditionary Forces. Two months later, on May 17, 1918, the 80th began to leave Camp Lee, heading for Newport News, Virginia, and embarkation. When troops were being rushed to France, the 23,000 soldiers of the 80th Division were sent "over there," arriving in St. Nazaire, Bordeaux and Brest on June 8, 1918.

=== France ===
The assembly point for the division was Calais, from which it departed early in June for training with the British Army in Artois and Picardy, France, and subsequently participated in the initial phases of the Somme Offensive. From there, 80th Division troops were abruptly moved to St. Mihiel for the first American Army offensive, serving under General John J. "Black Jack" Pershing. General Pershing praised the actions of the 80th Division for having gained all of their battle objectives. General Cronkhite, in command of the 80th, recognized his men with the statement, "The 80th Only Moves Forward", the motto that has marked the Division since 1918.

Commencing September 14, the division moved into the Argonne region and began its preparations for the offensive in that region during the period September 26 through November 11. One day before Major Emory's birthday, in conjunction with other American divisions, the 80th attacked at Bethincourt, advancing through the hell that was trench warfare a distance of nine kilometers in two days. Major Emory received the American Expeditionary Forces Citation for Gallantry in Action, for rallying the men of the 320th Regiment under terrific machine gun fire in action in the Bois des Ogons, France on September 26, 1918.

On September 29 the 80th Division was relieved and assembled in the vicinity of Cuisy, where on October 4 it again attacked, and over difficult ground attained a distance of four kilometers in nine days. On October 12 the division was again relieved and proceeded by march and bus to the Thiaucourt area where it was re-equipped.

At Thiacourt, the U.S. Army troops began using Springfield and Browning Automatic Rifles. Prior to that, British Enfields and French Cha Chat automatics had been used. With barely three weeks training with the newer rifles, the 80th troops were thrust into the third and final phase of the Meuse-Argonne Offensive. The 80th Division was the only one that saw action during each phase of that offensive.

On October 29, Emory's Regiment entered the line at St. Georges-St. Juvin and began preparation for what would be its last assault on the German lines.

At 11:30 p.m. on the evening of the 31st, Major Emory moved out with the battalion to take up their positions for the "jumping off" point along the St. Juvin-St. Georges road. At 1:45 a.m. on November 1, Emory signaled back to regimental headquarters, "The Omnibus is Full" - the signal that the battalion was in position. At 3:30 a.m. the Allied artillery barrage began, answered almost immediately by an enemy counter-barrage, reported later as the heaviest in all of the war. A slight cessation of the barrage, at 4:30 a.m., was accompanied by word that the Germans were advancing. At 5:30 a.m. the ground assault began.

=== Armistice ===
In the Argonne Forest outside Romagne, France, at 8:15 in the morning on November 1, 1918, just ten days before the Armistice, and just five days before the 320th Regiment would be relieved, Major German H. H. Emory died of machine gun wounds sustained while directing his battalion in their role as the assaulting unit in an attack that ultimately ended the war.

== Death and awarding of DSC ==
For his valor on the field of battle, Major Emory was honored by General of the Armies John J. "Black Jack" Pershing with the Distinguished Service Cross. This is the second highest military decoration awarded to a member of the United States Army for extreme gallantry and risk of life in actual combat with an armed enemy force. The citation reads, "The President of the United States of America, authorized by Act of Congress, July 9, 1918, takes pride in presenting the Distinguished Service Cross (Posthumously) to German H. H. Emory, Major, U.S. Army, for extraordinary heroism in action while serving with the 3rd Battalion, 320th Infantry Regiment, 80th Division, American Expeditionary Forces, near Sommerance, November 1, 1918. On the morning of November 1st, 1918, the 3rd Battalion, 320th Infantry had advanced under heavy enemy artillery and machine gun fire to the north slope of the Ravine Aux Pierres, north of the St. Juvin - St. Georges Road. The crest of the slope was being swept with a murderous machine gun fire and the advance of the battalion was momentarily checked. Without care for his personal safety and inspired only by the thought that his battalion must go forward, Major Emory, though exposed to direct machine gun fire and in plain view of the enemy, calmly moved back and forth along his whole front encouraging his troops and personally directing the attack. By his magnificent example of coolness and bravery, he so encouraged and inspired the men of his command that they held this very exposed position and finally succeeded in overcoming enemy resistance."

== Burial ==
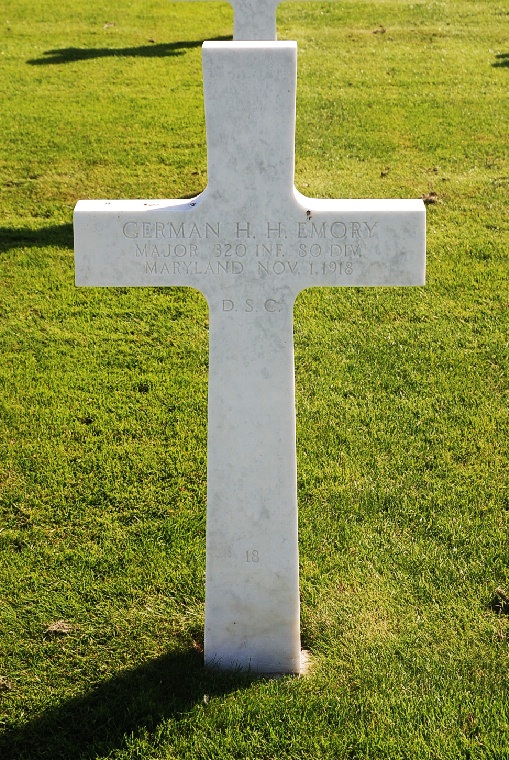
Burial Cross of Major German H. H. Emory, D.S.C. (1882–1918) in the Meuse-Argonne American Cemetery and Memorial, located east of the village of Romagne-sous-Montfaucon (Meuse), in France.

Originally Major Emory was buried in a little courtyard in the demolished town of St. Juvin, a small wooden cross with his name, rank, regiment and date of death marking his resting place. At the time of his death he was just 36 years old. Later his body was moved and re-interred at the Meuse-Argonne American Cemetery and Memorial (also known as the Argonne American Cemetery), along with 14,245 other American comrades from the American Expeditionary Forces (AEF). Most lost their lives during the Meuse-Argonne Offensive, which was the largest battle in American military history, involving 1.2 million American troops and was the principal engagement of the United States in WW I. It lasted from September 26 to the Armistice with Germany on November 11, 1918.

== Oil portrait and sculpture memorials ==
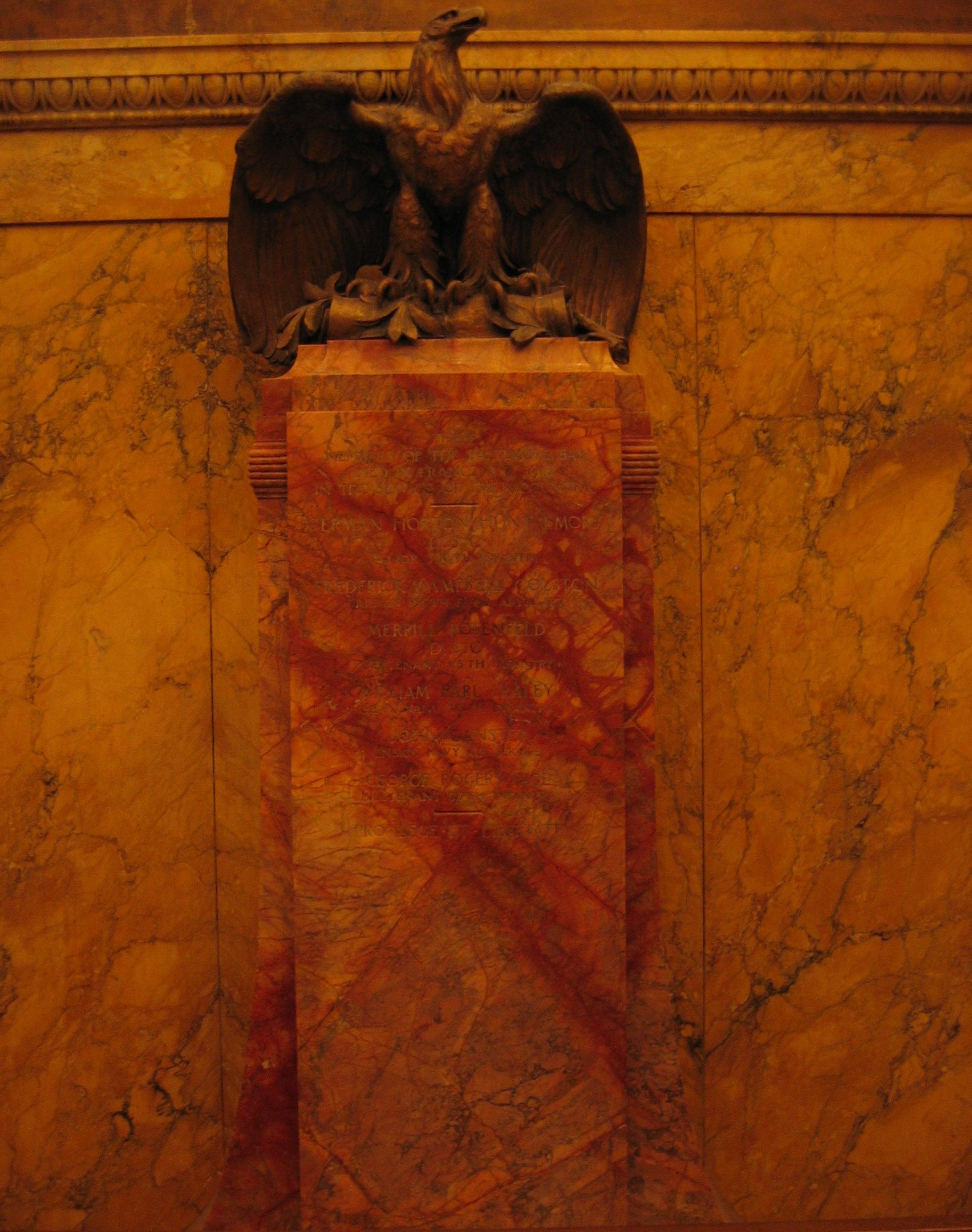
Memorial to Six Baltimore Attorneys Killed in World War I in France: Major Emory, was the Senior Officer. Bronze American Eagle on a marble pedestal, by Wyatt and Nolting, 1919. It is located in the Criminal Court Lobby of the Clarence M. Mitchell Courthouse.

Major Emory's oil portrait hangs in Courtroom 226 of the Clarence M. Mitchell Jr. Courthouse in Baltimore, MD. It was commissioned by his fellow attorneys in the Baltimore Bar Association and executed by the distinguished Baltimore portrait artist Thomas Cromwell Corner (1865–1938), who was schooled both in the United States and Paris, and was a founding member of the Baltimore Museum of Art. Emory's posthumous oil portrait is one of the largest in the Mitchell Courthouse, measuring 50" by 76". It depicts him wearing his Distinguished Service Cross. He is the only lawyer in the courthouse's extensive art collection to be pictured in a military uniform. Thomas C. Corner is the most prolific painter in the courthouse collection, with 20 portraits to his credit. Ironically, twenty years earlier, Corner had painted an oil half-length portrait of the major's grandfather, German H. Hunt. Along with five other Baltimore attorneys who died in World War 1, Emory is also honored with a bronze American eagle sculpture, rendered by the two Mitchell Courthouse architects J.B. Noel Wyatt (1847–1926) and William Nolting (1866–1940). It is mounted on a marble pedestal and located in the Criminal Court Lobby of the Mitchell Courthouse. Of the six Baltimore attorneys who died in World War 1 and honored by this sculpture, Major Emory was the most senior in rank. Another attorney, Lieutenant Merrill Rosenfeld, 115th Infantry, also received the Distinguished Service Cross.

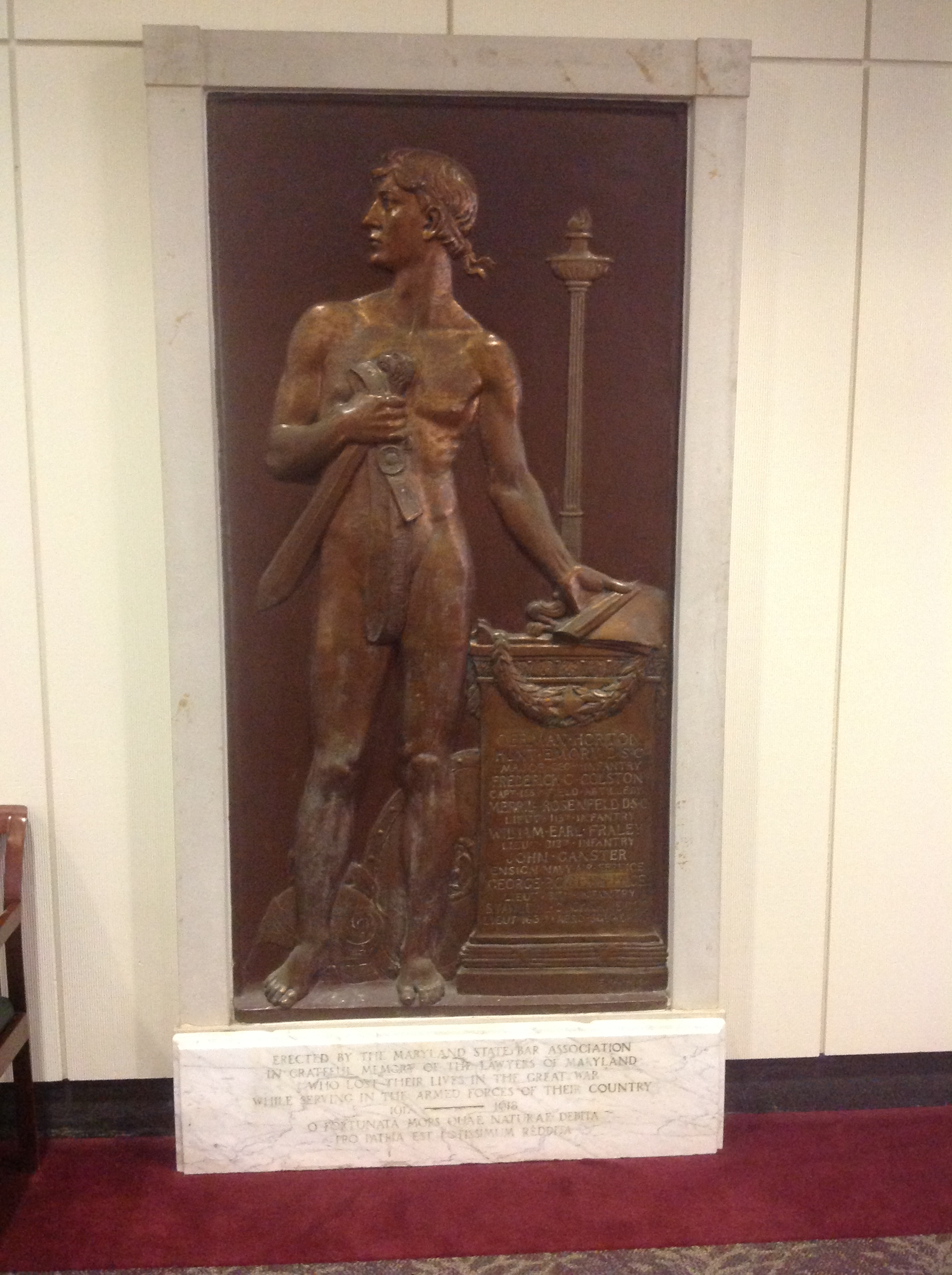
Maryland Court of Appeals Memorial to the seven Maryland Attorneys who died in France during World War I, by Ephraim Keyser. Major German Horton Hunt Emory D.S.C., 320th Infantry; Capt. Frederick Campbell Colston, 155th Field Art.; Lt. Merrill Rosenfeld, D.S.C. 115th Inf.; Lt. Wm. Earl Fraley, 313th Inf.; Ens. John Gangster, Naval Air Svc.; Lt. Stanley L. Cochrane, 166th Aero Squ.; Lt. George Roger Page, 317th Inf. Located in the Maryland Court of Appeals, Annapolis, MD.

The Maryland State Bar Association dedicated another bronze memorial tablet, over 6 feet in height, to these six Baltimore attorneys, plus one other Maryland lawyer, who died in the war, in the main entrance hall at the Maryland Court of Appeals in Annapolis on January 11, 1921. It was designed and executed by the Baltimore sculptor Ephraim Keyser and "represents the lawyer, turning in answer to his country's call, from his life work in his chosen profession, to serve its need on the field of battle." The pedestal altar reads in part, "In grateful memory of the Lawyers of Maryland who lost their lives in the Great War while serving in the armed forces of their country. 1917–1918, O fortunata mors quae naturae debita pro patria est potissimum reddita. (O fortunate the death, the debt to nature owed by all, Paid by them in advance for their country's cause. Horace)

In addition, his home church in Baltimore, Saint Michael and All Angels Protestant Episcopal Church, honored Emory with the placing of a bronze memorial tablet, the gift of the Fidelity Lodge of Masons, of which Emory was a member. Present at the dedication service on October 31, 1920, was Major General Adelbert Cronkhite, who was in command of the 80th Division in France, when Emory was killed. At the service Emory's priest, Bishop Philip Cook, related that Emory was moved primarily by the fact that he thought America was in mortal danger.
