= Rough Riders (miniseries) =

1997 film directed by John Milius

- Genre: War
- Written by: John Milius & Hugh Wilson
- Directed by: John Milius
- Starring: Tom Berenger; Sam Elliott; Gary Busey
- Theme music composer: Elmer Bernstein
- Composer: Peter Bernstein
- Country of origin: United States
- Original language: English

Production
- Executive producer: Tom Berenger
- Producers: William J. MacDonald; Robert Katz; Moctesuma Esparza; Larry Levinson
- Cinematography: Anthony B. Richmond
- Editor: Sam Citron
- Running time: 184 minutes
- Production companies: Affinity Entertainment; Esparza Katz; Larry Levinson Productions; Turner Pictures
- Budget: $19 million

Original release
- Network: TNT
- Release: July 20 – July 21, 1997

Rough Riders is a 1997 American television miniseries directed and co-written by John Milius about future President Theodore Roosevelt and the regiment known as the 1st US Volunteer Cavalry; a.k.a. the Rough Riders. The series prominently shows the bravery of the volunteers at the Battle of San Juan Hill, part of the Spanish–American War of 1898. It was released on DVD in 2006. The series originally aired on TNT with a four-hour running time, including commercials, over two consecutive nights during July 1997. It is, as of 2026, John Milius' last directorial credit for a film.

== Plot ==
In 1898 the US government decided to intervene on the side of the Cuban rebels in their struggle against Spanish rule. Assistant Navy Secretary Theodore Roosevelt decides to experience the war first hand by promoting and joining a volunteer cavalry regiment.

The regiment, later known as the Rough Riders, brings together volunteers from all corners of the nation and all walks of life. They include a stagecoach robber, Henry Nash, and patrician men.

When Roosevelt and his men finally land on Cuba, they face ambush, intense enemy fire, and a desperate, outnumbered charge up a defended hill.

== Cast ==
- Tom Berenger as Lieutenant Colonel / Colonel Theodore Roosevelt
- Sam Elliott as Captain William "Bucky" O'Neill
- Gary Busey as Major General Joseph Wheeler
- Brad Johnson as Henry Nash
- Buck Taylor as George Neville
- Illeana Douglas as Edith Roosevelt
- Chris Noth as Craig Wadsworth Jr.
- Brian Keith as President William McKinley
- George Hamilton as William Randolph Hearst
- R. Lee Ermey as Secretary of State John Hay
- Nick Chinlund as Frederic Remington
- Dale Dye as Colonel / Brigadier General Leonard Wood
- Holt McCallany as Sergeant Hamilton Fish
- Geoffrey Lewis as Eli
- James Parks as William Tiffany
- Dakin Matthews as Craig Wadsworth Sr.
- Mark Moses as Captain Woodbury Kane
- William Katt as Edward Marshall
- Francesco Quinn as Rafael Castillo
- Adam Storke as Stephen Crane
- Titus Welliver as B. F. Goodrich
- Diana Jorge as Mademoiselle Adler
- Eric Allan Kramer as Henry Bardshar
- Angee Hughes as Sara Bardshar
- Bob Primeaux as Bob "Indian Bob"
- Pablo Espinosa as Major Frederick Funston
- Michael Greyeyes as Delchaney
- Buck Taylor as George Neville
- Darin Heames as Lieutenant William Wheeler (based on Joseph M. Wheeler, IV)
- Marshall Teague as John Pershing
- John S. Davies as Henry Lawton

== Production ==
=== Development ===
Tom Berenger had starred in Gettysburg (1993) for Ted Turner and was also a long time admirer of Roosevelt. Berenger pitched the idea of a mini series on the Rough Riders to Turner, giving him an outline, and Turner agreed to finance a four-hour mini series for TNT.

"I see him as a 'force of nature'," said Berenger, "a kind of sweet, endearing, enthusiastic and honest man who probably wouldn't make it in politics today. Yet this incident in our history -- largely created by William Randolph Hearst and other yellow press barons -- took him to the White House."

Berenger originally intended to play Colonel Leonard Wood, with Stephen Lang to play Roosevelt. Berenger said the mini series "needs a couple other names.'.. It'll be as much fun as 'Gettysburg' was to do ... a bunch of guys playing a famous military unit... The casting director of 'Gettysburg' told me she had 6,000 actors' submissions for that production. There were a couple of big names who wanted to do it so badly they said, 'Just give me a couple of lines and a uniform - that's all I want.'"

Hugh Wilson wrote the first draft and planned to direct. Berenger agreed to star and was executive producer.

=== John Milius ===
Eventually Wilson bowed out due to creative differences and Berenger suggested he be replaced by John Milius. Milius had long been an admirer of Teddy Roosevelt, and featured him as a character in his film The Wind and the Lion, played by Brian Keith. He had tried to make a film about Roosevelt and the Rough Riders for a number of years but "nobody cared," he said. "When I would pitch a film about Roosevelt and the Spanish–American War, they wouldn't get it. They would say, 'It's not exactly a Western, and it's not a war picture, so what is it?' I think it's both. The last great Western of the 19th century.... [Roosevelt was] an extraordinary character. He makes a really good contrast to the way things are today. He put his money where his mouth was. He was the real thing."

According to Milius, TNT executives "said, 'We'll let you make it if you can make it at this price, write it quick, be in production in three months'... all these impossible things," said Milius. "And I said yes."

"This one does sort of glorify war," said Berenger, who eventually agreed to play Roosevelt. "But you have to consider that it was written by John Milius."

"In a sense, one man going up that hill, one battle, and a man became President and we acquired an overseas empire," said Milius. "Courage and valor are no longer considered great attributes in our culture. But for Roosevelt, they were the only issues. I agree."

Milius says the script was also about the bonding of the men. "It shows you that things happen to people that they never get over. It's why vets can only talk to each other. Everyone of them is scarred for life... Men go off to war because they really want to, not knowing what it's going to be. They think it's an adventure, a romantic fantasy. And, of course, it never is. People are brought together and forced to do something that is truly unnatural to man – kill each other. But in doing this sort of extraordinary self-destruction, man seems to bring all of his virtues to bear."

George Hamilton had previously made Evil Knievel with Milius and he agreed to play William Randolph Hearst.

=== Shooting ===
The film was shot in Texas over 48 days on a budget of $19 million. "Believe me, there were no trailers for the stars or anything," said Milius. "If anything, you got a chair."

"I was just pleased I got to do the subject matter; the shorter schedule didn't bother me," Milius added. "It was just another way of telling a story. With the shorter schedule, I just did the best I could do, worked twice as hard and didn't get any sleep."

Six Texas locations served as stand-ins for Cuba, Florida, New York and Washington, D.C. - Palestine, a town southeast of Dallas, was the period railroad; the Cuban jungle scenes were done outside Houston and the hill country outside San Antonio stood in for the training camp and San Juan Hill.

Several railroad scenes were filmed at the Texas State Railroad.

Milius considers the film one of his best. "They had a lot of controls on me, at Turner, and I just ran over them... They hated me, but I got the film made, didn't I?... That's what you have to do. You have to be true to the vision that you start out to do, otherwise what are you even there for?"

Brian Keith, who played President McKinley, committed suicide after filming and before the mini-series aired.

== Historical inaccuracies ==
- Bucky O'Neill commanded 'A' Troop of which Henry Nash was indeed a member, not 'G' Troop. Craig Wadsworth was a member of 'K' Troop
- Craig Wadsworth was depicted as "the top polo player in the country" when his renown as a horseman was actually from being a steeplechase rider. Also, his father Craig Sr. (portrayed by Dakin Matthews in the film), actually died when Wadsworth was an infant.
- Henry Nash was not a stagecoach robber but a miner and a schoolteacher. Nash and O'Neill did not have an antagonistic relationship due to O'Neill's "6th Sense" that Nash was a criminal. Bucky O'Neill and Henry Nash were actually friends. It has been speculated that Milius based Nash's character on William Sterin. In 1889, Sterin and three other men robbed a train in Arizona. O'Neill led the posse that captured Sterin & the three men who were subsequently sent to the Yuma Territorial Prison. In 1897, the men were pardoned and in 1898 Sterin joined the Rough Riders under an assumed name. It is believed that Sternin may have been killed in action during the "Battle of San Juan Hill."
- Bucky O'Neill is not buried in the Arizona desert as portrayed in the final scene; instead he is buried at Arlington National Cemetery in Virginia.
- There would indeed be a statue dedicated to Bucky O'Neill as Nash stated there would be, however, Nash had nothing to do with it. The statue was created after Henry Nash died.
- In reality, Theodore Roosevelt and Stephen Crane disliked each other and did not socialize during the Santiago campaign.
- Major General Joseph Wheeler is implied to be older and more experienced than Major General William Rufus Shafter, the V Corps commander. In reality, Shafter was two years older than Wheeler and also a Civil War veteran (and Medal of Honor recipient).
- Wheeler issued the order to attack San Juan Heights not to 1st Lieutenant John J. "Black Jack" Pershing of the 10th Cavalry, but to Brigadier General J. F. Kent, Commander of the 1st Division of the 5th Army Corps, who led his division in the main assault of San Juan Hill while the Rough Riders & the 10th Cavalry attacked Kettle Hill.
- Roosevelt did not get to the top of San Juan Hill until the fighting was over. A year after the war, in his book The Rough Riders, Roosevelt would distort his role in the battle and malign black soldiers as "shirkers" despite their importance in taking the hill along with other non-black regiments.
- Wheeler's son, a West Point graduate who was his aide-de-camp, was actually named Joseph Jr. ("Fighting Joe"), not William as depicted.
- Roosevelt experts did not like a scene where Roosevelt, despite his patrician New York upbringing, attends a formal reception with his wife Edith (played by Illeana Douglas) and drags her around the room and harangues guests. "He was filled with wild enthusiasm," Milius said, when questioned about the scene.
- The final scene of the movie begins with the caption "22 Years Later." Since the previous scene took place at the conclusion of the 1898 Battle of San Juan Hill, then the final scene must have taken place in 1920. The final scene is where Henry Nash, played by Brad Johnson, is in the desert, presumably Arizona, and is talking to the headstones of Buckey O'Neill and George Neville. In his conversation with the tombstones, Nash mentions 1) He just saw Teddy Roosevelt at Roosevelt's New York home and that Teddy was "doing poorly," 2) that Nash was a millionaire, and 3) that Nash's son was at Harvard. However, Nash could not have met Roosevelt in 1920 because Roosevelt died in 1919 and Nash died in 1902 in Manila, Philippines. Nash was never a millionaire businessman; he was a schoolteacher and his last salary, in 1902 in Manila, was for $1,200 per year. Henry Nash never had a son who went to Harvard. In fact, he never married and never had any children.

== Reception ==
=== Critical ===
A reviewer for Variety said "it's not straight history, the name-dropping's something fierce, and fictional characters are mixed liberally with imaginary takes of legendary figures; the first two hours of the four-hour opus are colorful, the second disturbingly corny. "Rough Riders" is a rough, sometimes silly, take on extraordinary American history."

A reviewer for the Los Angeles Times wrote that "it rarely manages to surface above a seemingly endless array of skirmishes, firefights, ambushes, infantry charges, hand-to-hand combat, carnage and killing."

The Baltimore Sun said the film "overstays its welcome by at least a third... so oozes with testosterone that your TV screen may start sprouting facial hair.... Milius gets so caught up in the male bonding, in relishing the way war makes men of boys and brothers of men, that he forgets there's a story to be told. In the end, what could have been a top-notch film about a brief little war, whose lasting import far outweighed its immediate impact, becomes an exercise in the minutiae of battle."

Filmink called it "highly entertaining".

=== Ratings ===
Rough Riders was the most watched basic cable original movie in July, delivering 16 million households over 10 plays.
