= Chris Noth =

American actor (born 1954)

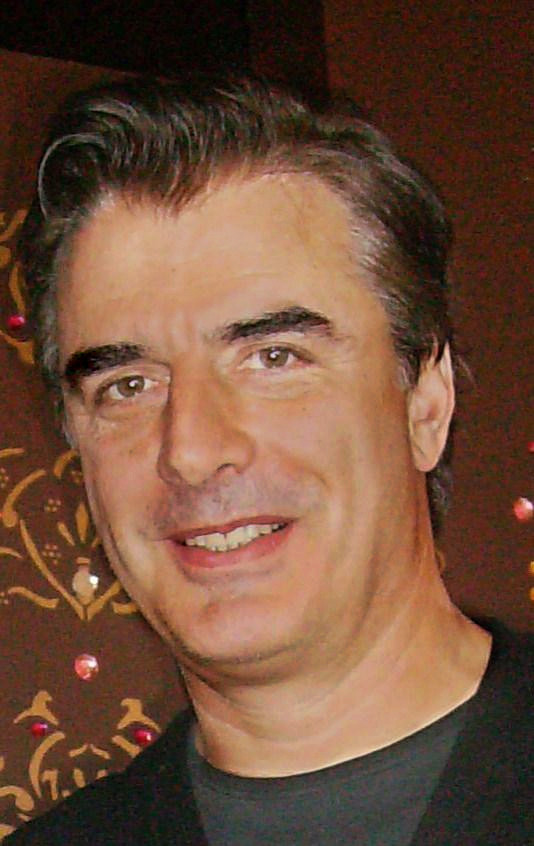
- Noth in 2008
- Born: Christopher David Noth; November 13, 1954 (age 72); Madison, Wisconsin, U.S.
- Education: Marlboro College (BA); Yale University (MFA)
- Occupation: Actor
- Years active: 1981–2021, 2025–present
- Spouse: Tara Wilson (m. 2012)
- Partner: Beverly Johnson (1990-1995)
- Children: 2

Christopher David Noth (/noʊθ/ NOHTH; born November 13, 1954) is an American actor. He is known for his television roles as NYPD Detective Mike Logan on Law & Order (1990–1995), Big on Sex and the City (1998–2004), and Peter Florrick on The Good Wife (2009–2016).

Noth reprised his role of Mike Logan on Law & Order: Criminal Intent (2005–2008), and reprised his role of Big in the films Sex and the City (2008) and Sex and the City 2 (2010). He was nominated for the Golden Globe Award for Best Supporting Actor on Television for Sex and the City in 1999 and for The Good Wife in 2010.

Noth starred in the first two seasons of the 2021 revival of The Equalizer, on CBS, and appeared in And Just Like That..., the revival of Sex and the City. His roles in both series were curtailed after the emergence of multiple sexual assault allegations against Noth in December 2021.

== Early life ==
Noth was born November 13, 1954, in Madison, Wisconsin, the youngest of three boys, to news reporter Jeanne Parr (1924–2016). Parr was one of the first female correspondents for CBS News, and host of her own CBS talk show The Jeanne Parr Show. His father was Charles James Noth (1922–1966), a marketing-company vice president and insurance agent who was a naval aviator in World War II and served as Ensign on the USS Antietam during the Korean War. Charles came from a wealthy family in Chicago, and his mother had Irish ancestry that traces back to Knockbride in County Cavan.

Noth's family settled in Stamford, Connecticut, when he was five. Noth grew up in Connecticut while his parents worked in New York City. His parents separated when he was 9 or 10, and his father died in a car accident in 1966 when Chris was 11. According to Noth, "losing my father left a crater in my life" and he found father figures in many teachers and certain friends of his mother's. While Parr was working as a CBS news reporter in New York during the 1960s, Noth often got into trouble. He was into vandalism and was smoking marijuana and driving at a very young age. During Parr's brief second marriage, the family moved to southern California in 1969, returning to New York in the early 1970s. Noth said that he started taking LSD with friends at age 15, once walking into someone else's house in Newport Beach while high and jumping naked off their pier into the water.

After Noth took a neighbor's car for a joyride and it rolled into another neighbor's house, his mother sent him to an all-boys boarding school (Storm King School) where he spent his freshman year (1968-1969). Noth persuaded his mother to let him leave Storm King School to attend an experimental coed school called The Barlow School in Dutchess County, New York, instead. Poet-dissenter Peter Kane Dufault taught American history at the school. Noth said Dufault was the best teacher he ever had, "He opened up a way of life to me, a life of the imagination; he showed us ... that life can be developed and explored through poetry". For Noth, this school with young artist teachers "for many of us, not relating to our parents, it became our real home", and although "the academics were a little shaky", this art school, with no grades, completely changed his life to focus on the arts. By 1973, he was "totally into being a hippie" with long hair. After graduation, he moved to Brooklyn with his girlfriend when he was eighteen, and worked at a school for the mentally disabled.

Noth attended Marlboro College in Vermont, originally intending to be a writer or poet. He received a classically oriented education and studied English literature and religion. Although the college did not have a theatre department, he discovered acting after joining the repertory theatre company to get out of Latin class. He first appeared on stage in the play She Stoops To Conquer, where he enjoyed the audience's unexpected laughter. After acting in a production of The Zoo Story by Edward Albee, his goals were set on becoming a stage actor. After graduation, he was eager to perform in The New York Repertory Theatre but found that there was not much work for young actors in New York after arriving in late 1978. The first and only job he could get was as a daytime bartender at the Only Child Restaurant, not realizing there was a brothel above the basement pub. He was accepted into the Neighborhood Playhouse School of the Theatre to study with acting teacher Sanford Meisner. He stayed in maid's rooms for little or no money in exchange for cleaning the house on a weekly basis. The school did not allow students to work in the theatre, and Noth was expelled after a photo appeared of him in The New York Times acting in a 1979 Manhattan Theatre Club play about an IRA bombing victim. He also studied script analysis with Stella Adler.

== Career ==
=== Theatre ===
Noth "did off-off Broadway and was a bad waiter in a dozen different restaurants for five years." He was fired from a number of restaurants, once for forgetting to return Governor Hugh Carey's credit card with the bill, and settled into cater-waitering bar mitzvahs and weddings. Noth got his Actors' Equity membership while at the Circle Rep Lab. In Circle Repertory Company's 1980 production of Innocent Thoughts, Harmless Intentions he played soldier James "Duke" Wade in an Alaskan army outpost in 1951–52, part of what the Christian Science Monitor called a "convincing squad of Actors' Equity enlisted men" in a play that was "impressively acted". He auditioned for Juilliard and Yale University and was accepted by both. He chose the shorter three-year degree at Yale School of Drama, where he got a scholarship.

Noth acted in 25 or more plays while studying at Yale School of Drama, attending classes during the day and acting in plays at night. Noth's first-year acting project at Yale was the Maxim Gorky play The Lower Depths in 1982–1983. In 1984, Frank Rich of The New York Times wrote that of the supporting cast, only Noth's and Ray Aranha's performances "leaves firm impressions" in the world premiere of the Wole Soyinka political satire A Play of Giants at Yale Repertory Theatre, where Noth played a sculptor creating a portrait of African dictators gathered at a United Nations embassy. In 1985, Noth acted in Keith Reddin's Rum and Coke at Yale Repertory Theatre, a play about the orchestration of the Bay of Pigs Invasion. By Noth's third year, he signed with an agent who saw him in a YSD production of Brendan Behan's The Hostage. Noth was also in Anton Chekhov's Three Sisters and William Shakespeare's Pericles, Prince of Tyre at YSD.

After graduating with an MFA in 1985, Noth told his agent he would not do television and went on the theater circuit. His preference to work in theater informed his decision to live in New York instead of Los Angeles. However, roles were slow to come and he decided he could do television to survive. In 1986, while working on the TV series Hill Street Blues in Los Angeles, Noth heard that Zoe Caldwell would be directing Hamlet at the American Shakespeare Festival at Stratford, Connecticut and successfully auditioned for the title role. The play was performed for student groups in the spring season that year and Noth felt the enthusiastic response of students from the inner cities to Hamlet's soliloquies made it one of his greatest experiences. In the 1988/89 season of Milwaukee Repertory Theater, he played a murderous bandit in the experimental Chilean play The Torch. In April 1989, Noth played "bohemian--out of place, angry with the world" Frank Shabata in Darrah Cloud's adaptation of the Willa Cather novel O Pioneers! in the Other Season at Seattle Repertory Theatre, co-produced by Women's Project. He also appeared in George Bernard Shaw play Arms and the Man at the Roundabout Theatre in 1989 as Sergius Saranoff. The New York Times wrote that Noth's acting "captures the strutting buffoon in the character" but lost "the more pitiable side", while The Christian Science Monitor wrote if "Noth's swaggering Sergius were any more Sergius-like, he would burst out of his uniform". Noth acted in plays for La MaMa Experimental Theatre Club and L.A.'s Mark Taper Forum.

In 1997, Noth played an opera composer in the Romulus Linney play Patronage at Ensemble Studio Theatre's 20th Annual Festival of New One-Act Plays. The New York Times wrote "the actors are so good that they may have put more flesh on the characters than even Mr. Linney intended" and that Noth and co-star Dana Reeve were "amusingly synchronized as they purred in unison...to the strains of Schubert". Linney became friends with Noth when they worked together on Patronage and Noth encouraged him to write a play about Delmore Schwartz as Noth "is a poet himself and loves the poetry of Delmore Schwartz", according to Linney. Noth performed in the 2002 staged reading of Linney's play Klonsky and Schwartz at the Eugene O'Neill Theater Center's annual Playwrights Conference and helped workshop the play at the 2003 Last Frontier Theatre Conference. In 1998, while working on Sex and the City before its TV debut, Noth did his first radio play as fortune-hunter Morris Townsend in the Voice of America production of The Heiress, an adaptation of the Henry James novel Washington Square, opposite Amy Irving in the title role.

In 2000, Noth made his Broadway debut in a revival of Gore Vidal's 1960 play The Best Man at Virginia Theatre as the conniving Senator Joseph Cantwell. Variety wrote that Noth "plays the role capably but without the seething edge required" and The New York Times wrote Noth "never gives Cantwell the all-consuming, compulsive drive" and the "variations on Nixonian tics..have the imposed feeling of a director's suggestions." A few months later The New York Times wrote the cast's performances improved significantly with Noth improving the most, having "achieved a fine balance between editorial cartoon and neurotic case study as the Nixonian man who would be president." The revival went on to win a Drama Desk Award and Outer Critics Circle Award for outstanding revival of a play and was nominated for Tony Award for Best Revival of a Play. In the 2002 premiere of Christopher Shinn's play What Didn't Happen at Playwrights Horizons, Noth's portrayal of Peter was described as "an enjoyably robust portrait" by The New York Times and "an endearing, minor-key star turn" by Variety.

Noth played Colonel Thayer in a 2005 staged reading of a revival of another Gore Vidal play, the 1961 drama On the March to the Sea, presented by Theater Previews at Duke at Duke University. According to reviews of his portrayal, "Noth effectively conveys a jaded, command soldier tired of war, sometimes ruthless, yet often philosophical and sympathetic", a contradictory character "beautifully evoked" as "fully and pitiably human" and comparable to Stanley Kowalski in his "deliberate malice"; although Noth "followed the script" when it occasionally turned melodramatic. Noth received glowing reviews as petty criminal "Teach" in David Mamet's play American Buffalo at the 2005 Berkshire Theatre Festival. In 2008, Noth portrayed Paul Zara in Beau Willimon's Off-Broadway debut play Farragut North staged by the Atlantic Theatre Company. The play had its world premiere in the week after the 2008 United States presidential election and The New York Times critic Ben Brantley wrote that he "enjoyed Mr. Noth's weary, bluff, stiff-jointed Paul." In 2009, Noth reprised the role in the play's West coast debut at the Geffen Playhouse opposite Chris Pine. Sex and the City 2 director Michael Patrick King demanded Noth lose the weight he gained for his role in the play before filming began.

In 2011, Noth starred in a Broadway revival of the 1972 play That Championship Season, playing Phil Romano. In 2019 Noth appeared with Isabelle Huppert in an Off-Broadway production of Florian Zeller's The Mother.

=== Film and television ===
Noth played small parts in films, including Smithereens (1982) and Baby Boom (1987) before his first starring role in the low-budget 1988 film Peluru dan Wanita (Bullets & Women) in Indonesia. Noth joined the cast of Hill Street Blues in the sixth season in 1986, where he was billed as "Christopher Noth". He also appeared in Another World.

Noth filmed a pilot for the legal/police drama series Law & Order in 1988, playing NYPD homicide detective Mike Logan. In 1990, NBC began airing Law & Order. Noth was fired from the show in 1995, due largely to creative friction with series creator Dick Wolf. He reprised the role of Logan in 1998 for the Law & Order television film, Exiled: A Law & Order Movie.

In 1995, Noth had a supporting role in a CBS miniseries adaptation of the Sidney Sheldon novel Nothing Lasts Forever where he and Vanessa Williams portrayed lovers who are medical residents in a San Francisco hospital. Noth appeared in a 1997 episode of the TV series Touched by an Angel. In the 1997 television mini-series Rough Riders on TNT he portrayed Craig Wadsworth, a member of the 1st United States Volunteer Cavalry.

From 1998 to 2004, Noth took the role of Carrie Bradshaw's on-again, off-again boyfriend "Big" on HBO's Sex and the City. The role established Noth as a romantic comedian and he reprised it for the 2008 Sex and the City film and its 2010 sequel. He had a small role as Helen Hunt's husband in the film Cast Away (2000) starring Tom Hanks. In 2001, he played an FBI agent on a three-episode arc of Crossing Jordan.

From 2005 to 2008, Noth returned to the role of Mike Logan on Law & Order: Criminal Intent, joining the show in its fifth season following a guest appearance on a fourth season episode. On this spin-off of the original Law & Order, Noth's detective team alternated episodes with Vincent D'Onofrio and Kathryn Erbe's characters. In the 2005 rom-com film, The Perfect Man, Noth's portrayal of the romance expert from whom Hilary Duff's lead character models a secret admirer for her mother was described as "appealing in a thinly written role" by Variety.

In the CBS series The Good Wife (2009–2016), Noth portrayed Peter Florrick, disgraced and resurrected politician husband of the title character portrayed by Julianna Margulies. Noth was not a full-time regular on the series, leaving him time to do plays and indie films. In 2009, Noth guest-starred as an authoritarian military man in the film My One and Only starring Renée Zellweger as a woman searching for a spouse.

In 2012, Noth narrated I Didn't Do It, a six-part crime documentary series about wrongful convictions produced by Toronto's Lively Media for Discovery Canada and Investigation Discovery and portrayed tycoon J. P. Morgan, who helped finance the Titanic, in the Encore channel miniseries Titanic: Blood and Steel. In 2013, he portrayed Anthony Romano, a financier of Deep Throat, in the film Lovelace. In 2014, Noth played the son-in-law of an aging man, Fred, portrayed by Christopher Plummer in the film Elsa & Fred. In the 2015 film After the Ball, Noth played a head of a Montreal fashion company.

In 2016, Noth joined the third season of the FX/Fox 21 Television Studios produced series Tyrant in the regular role of U.S. General William Cogswell who offers military support to the interim president of a fictional Middle Eastern country that is trying to start a social democracy. A review of Noth's first Tyrant episode likened General Cogswell to his Peter Florrick character in The Good Wife. In an interview before the episode aired, Noth said he was "pretty much done with parts that resemble Mr. Big or Peter Florrick", he was turning to darker roles after years of playing (mostly) good guys on his three hit TV shows. Noth portrayed a sleazy lawyer in the 2016 film White Girl. In the 2016 film Chronically Metropolitan Noth's portrayal of a philandering professor/novelist was praised by The Hollywood Reporter for "infusing his familiar-feeling character with intriguing nuances" and as "very good" by the Los Angeles Times.

In 2017, Noth played FBI agent Don Ackerman on the Discovery Channel's series Manhunt: Unabomber, about the hunt for the serial killer Ted Kaczynski and was the narrator for the "Sharks and the City: New York" episode of Discovery channel's Shark Week. Noth also portrayed FBI agent Frank Novak in Gone, a 12-episode procedural drama produced by NBC Universal. The New York Post wrote in its review of the show that "Noth, who's always reliable, is fine here, but doesn't have much to do other than set up each storyline and then bark lots of orders." In 2018, Noth played Jack Robertson in the Doctor Who episode "Arachnids in the UK" and returned to the show in the 2021 New Year's Day special, "Revolution of the Daleks".

In 2021, Noth played the lead role of William Bishop in CBS reboot crime drama series The Equalizer, which was written by Andrew W. Marlowe and Terri Edda Miller. The same year, Noth reprised his role as Mr. Big in And Just Like That..., the Sex and the City continuation, where he was killed off, leading to a subsequent Peloton advertisement in the role. By the end of the year, he was fired and the ad was pulled due to allegations of sexual assault.

== Personal life ==
Noth is co-owner of The Cutting Room, a New York lounge and music venue that opened in late 1999, with Steve Walter. He also co-owned the New York nightclub The Plumm with Noel Ashman and other investors including David Wells and Damon Dash. Noth became majority-stake owner of Ambhar Tequila in 2018.

Noth had a relationship with model Beverly Johnson from 1990 to 1995. Johnson filed a restraining order against Noth, accusing him of physical, verbal, and racial abuse.

He began a relationship with Tara Lynn Wilson, a Canadian model, actress, and former beauty queen after meeting her in 2001 or 2002. Their son Orion was born in January 2008. The couple became co-owners of the tea house Once Upon a Tea Cup in Windsor, Ontario, and another location in London, Ontario. They were married on April 6, 2012. Noth announced the birth of their second son, Keats, in February 2020.

Noth moved with his family to the Los Angeles suburb of Sherman Oaks. He owns an apartment in Greenwich Village that he has had since 1994, and another in a Lenox Hill co-op since 2017. The family has a summer house in the Berkshires on the edge of Great Barrington, Massachusetts.

== Sexual misconduct allegations ==
On December 16, 2021, Noth was accused of sexual assault by two women, who used the names Lily and Zoe, with one woman alleging that Noth cheated on his wife when he assaulted her. Both women, who did not know each other, contacted The Hollywood Reporter months apart. The incidents allegedly occurred in Los Angeles in 2004, and in New York in 2015. He denied the allegations, claiming the incidents were consensual and that he did not cross the line of "no means no". The next day, actress and screenwriter Zoe Lister-Jones alleged that Noth was "consistently sexually inappropriate" when she worked with him on a 2005 episode of Law & Order: Criminal Intent, was "a sexual predator", and was drunk while filming his scenes. Subsequently, he was dropped by A3 Artists Agency.

On December 18, 2021, another woman accused Noth of sexual assault saying that, when she was 18 years old and in New York in 2010, Noth forcibly kissed her and removed her tights in an effort to digitally penetrate her. Noth's publicist denied the incident happened and said Noth did not know the woman. On December 23, 2021, singer-songwriter Lisa Gentile accused Noth of sexually assaulting her in New York in 2002. She said he forcibly kissed her and grabbed and squeezed her breasts.

In the wake of the allegations, a $12 million deal for Entertainment Arts Research Inc. to buy Noth's tequila brand Ambhar was canceled, a Peloton commercial starring Noth and Ryan Reynolds was pulled from the air, and he was dismissed partway through the second season of The Equalizer; his character, William Bishop, was killed off-screen. A second appearance as Big in the season finale of And Just Like That... was also scrapped, and he made no third appearance in Doctor Who.

== Filmography ==
=== Film ===
Year	Title	Role	Notes
1981	Cutter's Way	Guard	Uncredited
1981	Waitress!	Cowley's Office	
1982	Smithereens	Transvestite Prostitute In Van	
1986	Off Beat	Ely Wareham Jr.	
1987	Baby Boom	Yuppie Husband	
1988	Peluru dan Wanita	Falco	
1991	Boyz n the Hood	The Waiter	
1993	Naked in New York	Jason Brett	
1995	Burnzy's Last Call	Kevin	
1997	The Deli	Sal	
1997	Cold Around the Heart	"T"	
1997	The Broken Giant	Jack Frey	
1999	Getting to Know You	Sonny	
1999	The Confessions	Campuso	
1999	A Texas Funeral	Clinton	
1999	Pigeonholed	Devon's Father	
2000	The Acting Class	Martin Ballsac	
2000	Cast Away	Dr. Jerry Lovett	
2001	Double Whammy	Detective Chick Dimitri	
2001	The Glass House	Uncle Jack Avery	
2002	Searching for Paradise	Michael De Santis	
2004	Mr. 3000	Schiembri	
2004	Tooth Fairy	Dad	Short film
2005	The Perfect Man	Ben Cooper	
2008	Sex and the City	John James "Mr. Big" Preston	
2008	Frame of Mind	Steve Lynde	
2009	My One and Only	Harlan	
2010	Sex and the City 2	John James "Mr. Big" Preston	
2010	Justice League: Crisis on Two Earths	Lex Luthor	Voice
2010	Sure Fire Hit	Tony	
2011	From Up on Poppy Hill	Akio Kazama	Voice
2012	3,2,1... Frankie Go Boom	Jack	
2013	Lovelace	Anthony Romano	
2014	Elsa & Fred	Jack	
2015	After the Ball	Lee Kassell	
2016	White Girl	George Fratelli	
2016	Chronically Metropolitan	Christopher	
2020	A New York Christmas Wedding	Father Kelly	Also executive producer
2025	Cutman	Loren	

=== Television ===
Year	Title	Role	Notes
1986	Killer in the Mirror	Johnny Mathews	Television film
1986	Hill Street Blues	Officer Ron Lipsky	3 episodes
1986	Apology	Roy Burnette	Television film
1987	At Mother's Request	Steve Klein	Television film
1987	I'll Take Manhattan	Fred Knox	Television film
1989	Monsters	The Devil	Episode: "Satan in the Suburbs"
1990–1995	Law & Order	Detective Mike Logan	Main role
1993	In the Shadows, Someone's Watching	Dr. Ferris	Television film
1994	Where Are My Children?	Cliff Vernon	Television film
1995	Homicide: Life on the Street	Detective Mike Logan	Episode: "Law & Disorder"
1995	Nothing Last Forever	Dr. Ken Mallory	Miniseries
1996	Abducted: A Father's Love	Larry Coster	Television film
1996	Born Free: A New Adventure	Dr. David Thompson	Television film
1997	Rough Riders	Craig Wadsworth	Miniseries
1997	Touched by an Angel	Carl Atwater	Episode: "Full Moon"
1997	Medusa's Child	Tony DiStefano	Television film
1998–2004	Sex and the City	John James "Mr. Big" Preston	Recurring role, 41 episodes
1998	Exiled: A Law & Order Movie	Detective Mike Logan	Television film
2001	Crossing Jordan	FBI Special Agent Drew Haley	2 episodes
2001	The Judge	Paul Madriani	Television film
2003	Julius Caesar	Gnaeus Pompeius Magnus	Miniseries
2004	Bad Apple	Mike Tozzi	Television film; also executive producer
2005–2008	Law & Order: Criminal Intent	Detective Mike Logan	Main role
2009–2016	The Good Wife	Peter Florrick	Recurring role
2012	I Didn't Do It	The Narrator	6 episodes
2012	Titanic: Blood and Steel	J. P. Morgan	6 episodes
2016	Tyrant	General William Cogswell	10 episodes
2017	Shark Week	The Narrator	Episode: "Sharks and the City: New York"
2017	Manhunt: Unabomber	Don Ackerman	7 episodes
2017–2018	Gone	FBI Agent Frank Booth	Main role
2018, 2021	Doctor Who	Jack Robertson	2 episodes
2019	Catastrophe	James Cohen	Episode #4.5
2019	Very Important Person	Chris Noth	Episode #2.12
2021–2022	The Equalizer	William Bishop	Main role (seasons 1 and 2)
2021	And Just Like That...	John James "Mr. Big" Preston	Episode: "Hello, It's Me"

== Awards and nominations ==
Year	Association	Category	Nominated work	Result	Ref.
1994	Viewers for Quality Television	Best Supporting Actor in a Drama Series	Law & Order	Nominated	
1995	Screen Actors Guild Awards	Outstanding Performance by an Ensemble in a Drama Series	Law & Order	Nominated	
1996	Screen Actors Guild Awards	Outstanding Performance by an Ensemble in a Drama Series	Law & Order	Nominated	
2000	Golden Globe Awards	Best Supporting Actor – Series, Miniseries or Television Film	Sex and the City	Nominated	
2001	Theatre World Awards	Theatre World Award	The Best Man	Won	
2003	Satellite Awards	Best Supporting Actor – Television Series – Musical or Comedy	Sex and the City	Nominated	
2009	People's Choice Awards	Favorite Cast	Sex and the City	Nominated	
2011	Golden Globe Awards	Best Supporting Actor – Series, Miniseries or Television Film	The Good Wife	Nominated	
2011	Screen Actors Guild Awards	Outstanding Performance by an Ensemble in a Drama Series	The Good Wife	Nominated	
2012	Screen Actors Guild Awards	Outstanding Performance by an Ensemble in a Drama Series	The Good Wife	Nominated	
2015	GQ Men of the Year Turkey	GQ International Icon Of The Year	Chris Noth	Won	
2016	La Costa Film Festival	Shining Star Award	Chris Noth	Won	
2017	North Fork TV Festival	Canopy Award	Chris Noth	Won	

== General and cited references ==
- Douglas, Illeana (January 17, 2017). "Chris Noth - The Film Scene with Illeana Douglas / Christopher Noth, Actor - I Blame Dennis Hopper on Popcorn Talk". illeanaspodcast.com (Podcast) – via YouTube.
