= Brett Eppehimer =

American-Italian basketball player

Personal information
- Born: May 28, 1976 (age 50) Pottstown, Pennsylvania
- Listed height: 6 ft 0 in (1.83 m)
- Listed weight: 170 lb (77 kg)

Career information
- High school: The Hill School (Pottstown, Pennsylvania)
- College: Lehigh (1995–1999)
- Playing career: 1999–2006
- Position: Point guard

Career history
- 1999: Pennsylvania ValleyDawgs
- 1999–2000: SG Braunschweig
- 2000–2001: Tenerife
- 2001–2002: London Towers
- 2002–2003: Ilysiakos
- 2003: Los Barrios
- 2003–2004: Sicilia Messina
- 2005: Eurorida Scafati
- 2005–2006: Giants Bergen op Zoom

Brett Eppehimer (born May 28, 1976, in Pottstown, Pennsylvania) is an American-Italian former NCAA Division I and professional basketball player.

== College career ==
Eppehimer attended Lehigh University (1995–1999), in Bethlehem, Pennsylvania, where he played NCAA Division I basketball and finished with 1,742 career points. The point guard/shooting guard averaged over 20 points per game, in three different seasons, and led the Patriot League in scoring twice. In 1998, Eppehimer finished as the 4th leading scorer in college basketball, averaging 24.7 points per game.

== Professional career ==
Following university, Eppehimer signed in Europe, with Braunschweig of the German Basketball Bundesliga. During his first professional season, he averaged 20.7 points and 6.2 assists per game, both top-10 in the league. Eppehimer (a dual citizen of the United States and Italy) earned All-Bosman 1st team, awarded to the best European players in Germany.

Eppehimer played another seven seasons professionally. The clubs he played for included: Tenerife CB (Tenerife, Spain), London Towers (London, England) of the BBL and EuroLeague, Ilysiakos Athens (Athens, Greece), CB Los Barrios (Los Barrios, Spain), Sicilia Messina (Messina, Italy), Legea Scafati (Scafati, Italy), and the Polynorm Giants in Bergen-op-Zoom, Netherlands.

== Personal ==
Eppehimer is the older brother of professional basketball player Nick Eppehimer.
