= Thomas Cromwell Corner =

American artist (1865–1938)

Thomas Cromwell Corner (1865–1938) was a portrait artist from Baltimore, Maryland, United States, and founding member of the Baltimore Museum of Art.

== Early years ==
Thomas Cromwell Corner was born in Baltimore to William and Camilla Corner on February 2, 1865. As a seventeen-year-old student at Baltimore City College, Corner became interested in painting and studied under George B. Way, a local landscape painter. He then went on to further his education at the Maryland Institute College of Art and Art Students League in New York under J. Alden Weir and Kenyon Cox before enrolling in the Acadêmie Julian in the fall of 1888. While in Paris, Corner attended classes led by Jean-Joseph Benjamin-Constant, Jules Joseph Lefebvre, Gabriel Ferrier, and François Flameng. In 1891, he exhibited a portrait at the salon.

== Career ==
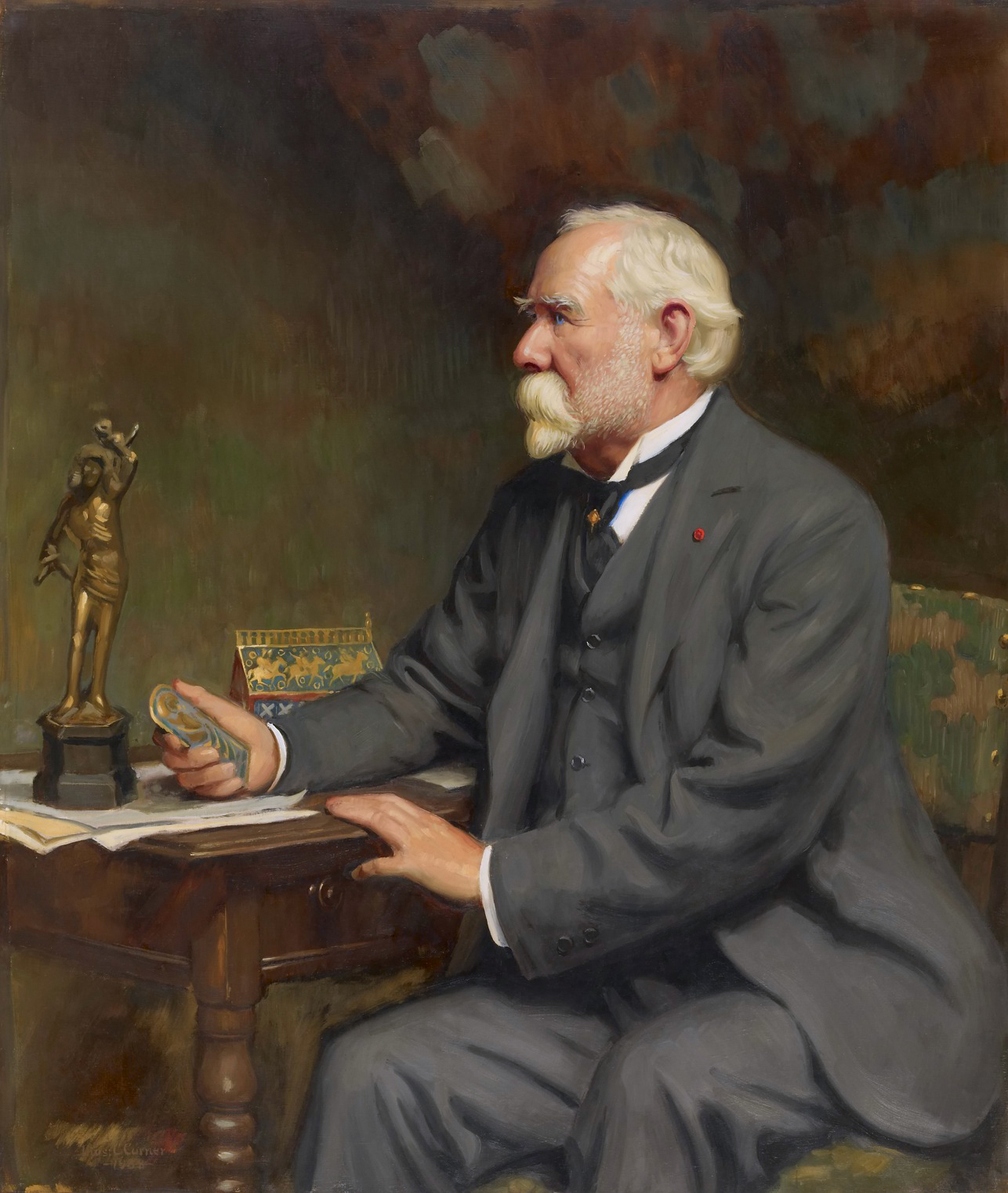
Corner's 1938 portrait of Henry Walters

In 1892 he returned to Baltimore where he began a career as a portrait artist. Corner is most known for his portraits of prominent businessmen, and he also painted other notable members of society including William Osler, William H. Welch, Henry Walters, Edward Cooper, the Mayor of New York, and Reverend Edward G. Helfenstein, the Bishop of Maryland. His portrait of Chief Justice Charles Evans Hughes is in the New York State Capitol and his portrait of Governor Edwin Warfield is in the Annapolis State House. Corner's works are also held by The Baltimore Museum of Art, the Maryland Historical Society, and the Enoch Pratt Free Library. During his lifetime Corner often exhibited his paintings at the University Club of Johns Hopkins University.

== Community presence ==
Corner served on the City-Wide Congress Committee on Founding an Art Museum (1911–1914) as well as on the first board of trustees of the Baltimore Museum of Art. As both an artist and trustee of The Baltimore Museum of Art, Corner was able to act as an emissary between the realm of the museum and the world of artists. He was well respected and valuable to the accessions committee of the Baltimore Museum of Art due to his wide background in and knowledge of the field. In addition to his role at the Baltimore Museum of Art, Corner also was a long-time member of the Charcoal Club of Baltimore as well as the president of the Maryland Institute Alumni Association. MedChi, The Maryland State Medical Society holds six paintings by Corner in their art collection, including one of Sir William Osler, MD.

== External references ==
- "Blanchard Randall Papers, 1914-1969" <https://artbma.org/documents/findingAids/BMA_Board-of-Trustees-Records.pdf>
- "Thomas Cromwell Corner (American, 1865-1938)" <http://www.the-athenaeum.org/people/detatail.php?ID==615>
- "The Annapolis Complex Collection: A Wealth of Maryland History." 2002. Maryland State Archives. <http://www.msa.md.gov/megafile/msa/stagsere/se1/se14/000027/html/hesitant_revolut/msa/speccol/sc1500/sc1545/e_catalog_2002/corner.html>
- "Galleries during Pope Building Opening, The Baltimore Museum of Art, 1929." <http://cdm15264.contentdm.oclc.org/cdm/singleitem/collection/p15264coll5/id/10/rec/1>
- Mike Giuliano, "Old Lines: BMA's Maryland Artists Exhibit Settles No Arguments" City Paper5 Jun. 2002<http://www2.citypaper.com/arts/story.asp?id=3844>
- "Corner's Art to be Exhibited Here This Week" 8 Nov. 1936. The Sun.
- M.S.P., "A Tribute to Thomas C. Corner" 13 Sept. 1938. Baltimore Morning Sun.
- "Mr.Corner Exhibits at University Club" Gardens, Houses & People.Dec., 1936, 40.
