= Nick Eppehimer =

American-Italian basketball player

Personal information
- Born: November 20, 1979 (age 46) Pottstown, Pennsylvania
- Listed height: 6 ft 7 in (2.01 m)
- Listed weight: 210 lb (95 kg)

Career information
- High school: The Hill School (Pottstown, Pennsylvania)
- College: Marist (1999–2003)
- NBA draft: 2003: undrafted
- Playing career: 2003–2009
- Position: Shooting guard / small forward

Career history
- 2003: Benetton Treviso
- 2003–2004: Dinamo Sassari
- 2004: Nova Virtus Ragusa
- 2004–2005: Norrköping Dolphins
- 2005: ALM Évreux Basket
- 2006–2007: Norrköping Dolphins
- 2008–2009: Longwy-Rehon

Career highlights
- Third-team All-MAAC (2003); Italian League champion (2003)

Nicholas Eppehimer (born November 20, 1979) is an American-Italian former professional basketball player.

== College career ==
Eppehimer played college basketball at Marist College in Poughkeepsie, New York, before going on to become a professional basketball player in Europe. Eppehimer was a 1,000 point scorer at Marist, and teamed up with another future professional, in Sean N. Kennedy, while there.

== Professional career ==
After Marist, Eppehimer left for Treviso (Pallacanestro Treviso), in the Italian LBA League, where with the team, he won both the regular season and post-season titles in 2003. Treviso also finished as runner-up in the EuroLeague championship that season to FC Barcelona Bàsquet of Spain.

Some of his other professional accomplishments include: making the Swedish League All-Star team and All-Bosman team in 2005, while playing for the Norrköping Dolphins in Norrköping, Sweden. Eppehimer also played professionally with Dinamo Sassari, Italy, and ALM Évreux Basket, France. He last played for Longwy-Rehon of France.

== Personal ==
Eppehimer is the younger brother of professional basketball player Brett Eppehimer.
