= Broad-gauge railway =

Rail track gauge wider than 4 ft 8 1/2 in

A broad-gauge railway is a railway with a track gauge (the distance between the rails) broader than the 1,435 mm (4 ft 8 1/2 in) used by standard-gauge railways.

Broad gauge of 1,520 mm (4 ft 11 27/32 in), more known as Russian gauge, is the dominant track gauge in former Soviet Union countries (CIS states, Baltic states, Georgia, Ukraine) and Mongolia.

Broad gauge of 1,524 mm (5 ft), commonly known as five foot gauge, is mainly used in Finland. Broad gauge of 1,600 mm (5 ft 3 in), commonly known as Irish gauge, is the dominant track gauge in Ireland, the Australian states of Victoria and South Australia and the Brazilian states of Rio de Janeiro, São Paulo and Minas Gerais.

Broad gauge of 1,668 mm (5 ft 5 21/32 in), commonly known as Iberian gauge, is the dominant track gauge in Spain and Portugal.

Broad gauge of 1,676 mm (5 ft 6 in), commonly known as Indian gauge, is the dominant track gauge in India, Pakistan, Bangladesh, Sri Lanka, Argentina, Chile, and on BART (Bay Area Rapid Transit) in the San Francisco Bay Area. This is the widest gauge in common use anywhere in the world. It is possible for trains on both Iberian gauge and Indian gauge to travel on each other's tracks with no modifications in the vast majority of cases.

== History ==
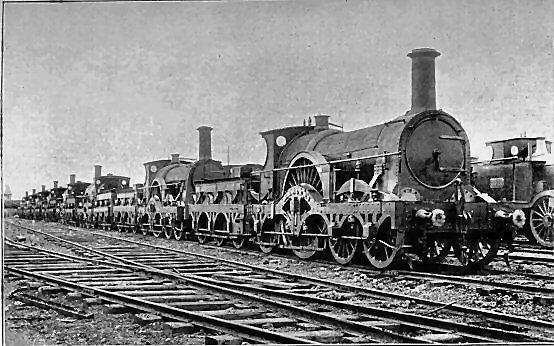
Great Western Railway broad-gauge steam locomotives awaiting scrapping in 1892 after the conversion of the tracks to 4 ft 8 1/2 in (1,435 mm) standard gauge

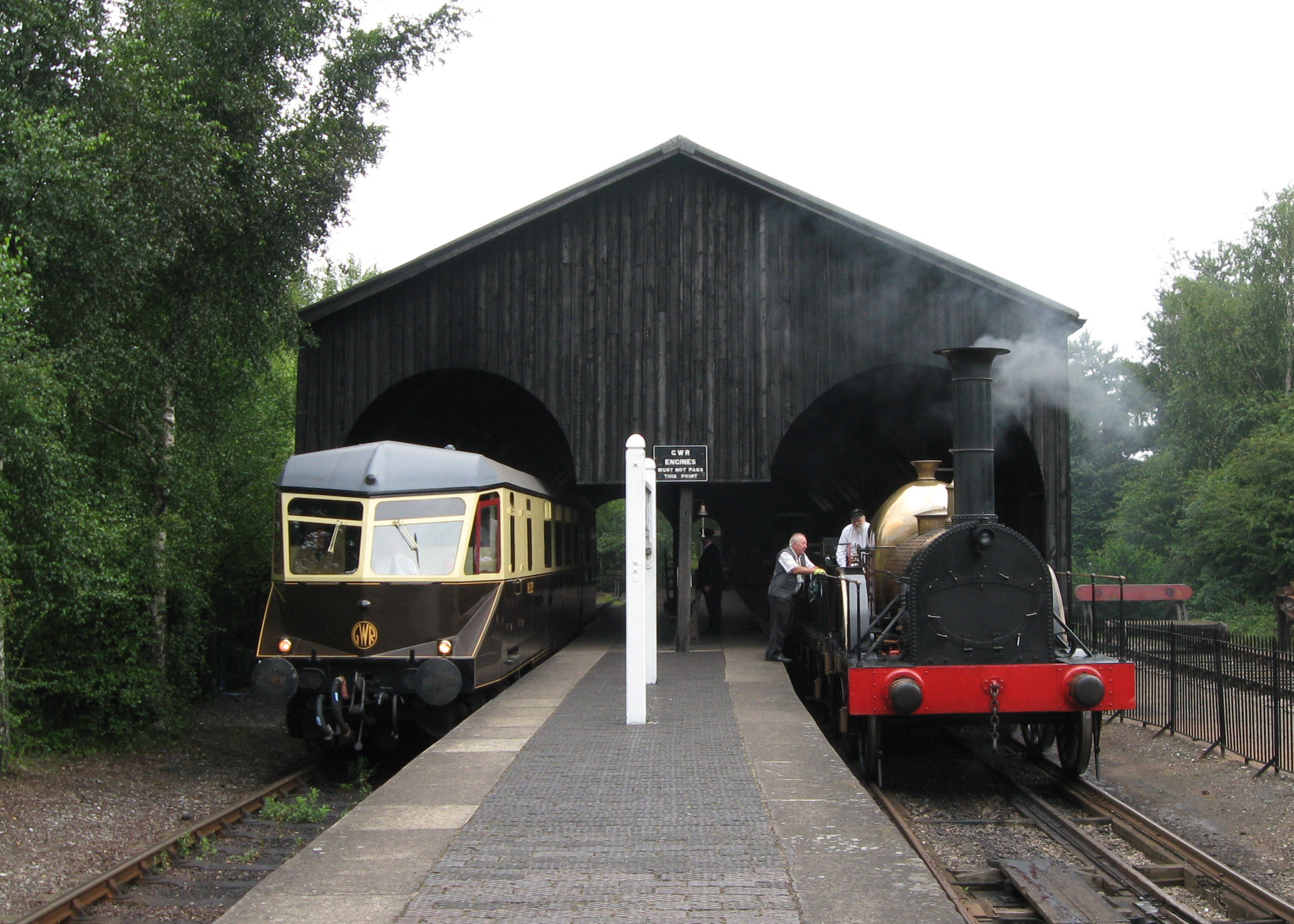
A replica GWR Firefly Class broad-gauge steam locomotive, with a preserved, standard-gauge GWR railcar, Didcot Railway Centre, 2009

In Great Britain, broad gauge was first used in Scotland for the Dundee and Arbroath Railway (1836–1847) and the Arbroath and Forfar Railway (1838–1848). Both short and isolated lines, they were built in 5 ft 6 in (1,676 mm). The lines were subsequently converted to standard gauge and connected to the emerging Scottish rail network.

The Great Western Railway was designed by Isambard Kingdom Brunel in 1838 with a gauge of 7 ft 1/4 in (2,140 mm), and retained this gauge until 1892. Some harbours also used railways of this gauge for construction and maintenance. These included Portland Harbour and Holyhead Breakwater, which used a locomotive for working sidings. As it was not connected to the national network, this broad-gauge operation continued until the locomotive wore out in 1913. The gauge initially proposed by Brunel was 7 ft (2,134 mm) exactly but this was soon increased by 1/4 in (6 mm) to 7 ft 1/4 in (2,140 mm) to accommodate clearance problems identified during early testing. George Stephenson was to add an extra half inch to his original 4 ft 8 in (1,422 mm) gauge for the same reason.

While the Parliament of the United Kingdom of Great Britain and Ireland was initially prepared to authorise lines built to the broad gauge of 7 ft (2,134 mm), it was eventually rejected by the Gauge Commission in favour of all new railways in England, Wales and Scotland being built to standard gauge of 4 ft 8 1/2 in (1,435 mm), this being the gauge with the greatest mileage. Railways which had already received their enabling Act would continue at the 7 ft gauge. Ireland, using the same criteria, was allocated a different standard gauge, the Irish gauge, of 5 ft 3 in (1,600 mm) which is also used in the Australian states of South Australia and Victoria. Broad-gauge lines in Britain were gradually converted to dual gauge or standard gauge from 1864 and finally the last of Brunel's broad gauge was converted over a weekend in 1892.

In 1839, the Netherlands started its railway system with two broad-gauge railways. The chosen gauge of 1,945 mm (6 ft 4 9/16 in) was applied between 1839 and 1866 by the Hollandsche IJzeren Spoorweg-Maatschappij (HSM) for its Amsterdam–The Hague–Rotterdam line and between 1842 and 1855, firstly by the Dutch state, but soon by the Nederlandsche Rhijnspoorweg-Maatschappij (NRS), for its Amsterdam–Utrecht–Arnhem line. But the neighbouring countries Prussia and Belgium already used standard gauge, so the two companies had to regauge their first lines. In 1855, NRS regauged its line and shortly afterwards connected to the Prussian railways. The HSM followed in 1866. There are replicas of one broad-gauge 2-2-2 locomotive (De Arend) and three carriages in the Nederlands Spoorwegmuseum (Dutch Railway Museum) in Utrecht. These replicas were built for the 100th anniversary of the Dutch Railways in 1938–39.

The erstwhile Great Indian Peninsula Railway introduced a broad gauge of 1,676 mm (5 ft 6 in) for the first passenger railway line in India, between Bori Bunder and Thane. This was later adopted as the standard throughout the country, as it was thought to be safer in areas prone to cyclones and flooding. The 1,676 mm (5 ft 6 in) gauge is now commonly referred to as Indian gauge. While some initial freight railway lines in India were built using standard gauge, most of the standard and narrow gauge railways have since been dismantled and relaid in broad gauge.

Ireland and some states in Australia and Brazil have a gauge of 5 ft 3 in (1,600 mm) but Luas, the Dublin light rail system, is built to standard gauge. Russia and the other former Soviet Republics use a 1,520 mm (4 ft 11 27/32 in) (originally 5 ft (1,524 mm)) gauge while Finland continues to use the 5 ft (1,524 mm) gauge inherited from the Russian Empire (the two standards are close enough to allow full interoperability between Finland and Russia). Portugal and the Spanish Renfe system use a gauge of 1,668 mm (5 ft 5 21/32 in) called Ancho Ibérico in Spanish or Bitola Ibérica in Portuguese (see Iberian gauge); though there are plans to convert to standard gauge.

In Toronto, Canada, the gauge for TTC subways and streetcars was chosen in 1861. Toronto adopted a unique Toronto gauge of 4 ft 10 7/8 in (1,495 mm), an "overgauge" originally stated to "allow horse-drawn wagons to use the rails" on the horse-drawn streetcar lines of the day but with the practical effect of precluding the use of standard-gauge equipment in the street. The Toronto Transit Commission still operates the Toronto streetcar system and three heavy-rail subway lines using this unique gauge. The light metro Scarborough RT and two light rail lines under construction (Eglinton Crosstown line and Finch West) use standard gauge.

In 1851, the 5 ft 6 in (1,676 mm) broad gauge was officially adopted as the standard gauge for the Province of Canada, becoming known as the Provincial gauge and government subsidies were unavailable for railways that chose other gauges. This caused problems in interchanging freight cars with northern United States railroads, most of which were built to standard gauge or a gauge similar to it. In the 1870s (mainly between 1872 and 1874), Canadian broad-gauge lines were changed to standard gauge to facilitate interchange and the exchange of rolling stock with American railroads. Today, almost all Canadian railways are standard-gauge.

In the early days of rail transport in the US, railways tended to be built out from coastal cities into the hinterland, and systems did not initially connect. Each builder was free to choose its own gauge, although the availability of British-built locomotives encouraged some railways to be built to standard gauge. As a general rule, southern railways were built to one or another broad gauge, mostly 5 ft (1,524 mm), while northern railroads that were not standard gauge tended to be narrow gauge. Most of the original track in Ohio was built in 4 ft 10 in (1,473 mm) Ohio gauge, and special "compromise cars" were able to run on both this track and standard-gauge track. In 1848, Ohio passed a law stating "The width of the track or gauge of all roads under this act, shall be four feet ten inches between the rails." When American railroads' track extended to the point that they began to interconnect, it became clear that a single nationwide gauge was desirable.

Six-foot-gauge railroads (6 ft [1,829 mm]) had developed a large regional following in New York State in the first part of the 19th century, due to the influence of the New York and Erie, one of the early pioneering railroads in America, chartered in 1832, with its first section opening in 1841. The builders and promoters decided that a six-foot track gauge would be needed for locomotives to be larger and more powerful than were in general use at the time, for pulling very large trains. Also the six-foot gauge provided greater stability, and the New York and Erie would operate passenger cars up to 11 feet (3.4 m) wide. Building westward from the Hudson River, it eventually reached Lake Erie, establishing a mainline longer than 400 miles (640 km) providing a shortcut to the American Midwest region from the New York City vicinity, and helping spawn a regional network of six-foot-gauge railroads almost exclusively within New York State.

Many early New York railways were Erie railroad-built branch lines, while others were independent railroads that wanted to partner and interchange with the Erie. These included the Walkill Valley, the Albany and Susquehanna (later part of the Delaware and Hudson); the Elmira, Jefferson & Canandaigua (later the Northern Central, becoming part of the Pennsylvania Railroad); the Delaware, Lackawanna and Western mainline (which also had a significant amount of trackage in Pennsylvania); predecessor lines of the New York and Oswego Midland (later the New York, Ontario, and Western); and the Canandaigua and Niagara Falls (later becoming part of the New York Central railroad's Peanut Route along the shoreline of Lake Ontario). However, by the late 1870s, the trend was inevitable, and conversion to standard gauge began, some lines first becoming "dual-gauged" with the addition of a third running rail. Between 1876 and 1880, most of the remaining six-foot–gauge trackage was converted.

In 1886, the railways in the Southern United States agreed to coordinate changing gauge on all their tracks. After considerable debate and planning, most of the southern rail network was converted from 5 ft (1,524 mm) gauge to 4 ft 9 in (1,448 mm) gauge, nearly the standard of the Pennsylvania Railroad, over two days beginning on 31 May 1886. Over a period of 36 hours, tens of thousands of workers pulled the spikes from the west rail of all the broad-gauge lines in the South, moved them 3 in (76 mm) east and spiked them back in place. The new gauge was close enough that standard-gauge equipment could run on it without difficulty. By June 1886, all major railroads in North America were using approximately the same gauge. The final conversion to true standard gauge took place gradually as track was maintained.

Some North American tram (streetcar) lines intentionally deviated from standard gauge. This may have been to make the tram companies less tempting targets for takeovers by the steam railways (or competing tram companies), which would be unable to run their trains over the tram tracks.

Pennsylvania trolley gauge of 5 ft 2 1/2 in (1,588 mm), is still used on the streetcars in New Orleans, and the Pittsburgh Light Rail system. This gauge was also used for the now defunct Pittsburgh Railways, West Penn Railways, and trams in Cincinnati. Similar 5 ft 2 1/4 in (1,581 mm) gauge is used in Philadelphia on SEPTA routes, 15, the Media–Sharon Hill Line, the Subway–Surface Trolleys and the Market–Frankford Line.

Bay Area Rapid Transit (BART) system in the San Francisco Bay Area was opened in 1972 with 5 ft 6 in (1,676 mm) gauge. The system has been extended multiple times since then, using new railcars custom built with this non-standard gauge.

The use of a non-standard gauge precludes interoperability of rolling stock on railway networks. On the British Great Western Railway the 7 ft 1/4 in (2,140 mm) gauge was supposed to allow high speed, but the company had difficulty with locomotive design in the early years, losing much of the advantage, and rapid advances in railway track and suspension technology allowed standard-gauge speeds to approach broad-gauge speeds within a decade or two. On the 5 ft 3 in (1,600 mm) and 5 ft 6 in (1,676 mm) gauges, the extra width allowed bigger inside cylinders and greater power, a problem solvable by using outside cylinders and higher steam pressure on standard gauge. In the end, the most powerful engines on standard gauge in North America and Scandinavia far exceeded the power of any early broad-gauge locomotive, but then met limits set by other factors such as the capacity of manual stoking, the axle (and total) locomotive weight that would trigger upgrades to the rails and bridges, the maximum wheelbase and/or boiler length compatible with an individual route's curves.

In the 1930s German engineering studies focused on a Breitspurbahn system of railways of three-meter gauge to serve Hitler's future German Empire.

=== High-speed rail ===
Spain uses standard-gauge track for its high-speed railways in order to provide cross-border services with France and the rest of Western Europe, but runs high-speed trains on its legacy broad-gauge network at 200 km/h (120 mph) and are developing trains to travel at speeds in excess of 250 km/h (160 mph). Russia uses a modified Siemens Velaro high-speed train on its flagship St Petersburg to Moscow service at 250 km/h (160 mph) and can run at 350 km/h (220 mph) on dedicated track. The country is planning to build its portion of the Beijing to Moscow high-speed railway in broad gauge. Finland and Russia used a modified Alstom Pendolino on the Allegro service between Saint Petersburg and Helsinki at 220 km/h (140 mph). Uzbekistan uses a modified Talgo 250 on the Tashkent–Bukhara high-speed rail line at 250 km/h (160 mph).

South Asia primarily uses the broad gauge for its passenger rail services and the fastest broad-gauge train presently in the region is the Indian Railways' Vande Bharat Express (a.k.a. Train 18). During one of the trial runs, the Vande Bharat Express achieved a peak speed of 180 km/h (110 mph). The sustained speeds of this train is considerably lower, with a peak operational speed of 160 km/h and an average speed of 95 km/h, due to track limitations. Indian Railways has plans to introduce a higher speed Vande Bharat sleeper train that is capable of 200 km/h, but the project has encountered delays stemming from bids for rolling-stocks with poor local sourcing. A number of semi-high-speed railway projects using broad-gauge tracks are being planned or built in the region, with sustained speeds of 200 km/h with future-proofing for 250 km/h. India's current high-speed railway project is being built on the standard gauge due to limitations imposed by the Japanese consortium funding the project, however the feasibility reports by both the French and German consultants preferred a broad-gauge high-speed railway. These European reports stated that the additional costs of train procurement, due to the essential modifications of the rolling-stock for the broad gauge, from European rolling-stock manufacturers such as Alstom or Siemens would be softened through a large minimum order size of at least thirty train sets. A considerable debate has continued about the suitability of the high-speed rail on standard gauge for the Indian travel demands and the possible exclusion of the existing rail network in India. The recent discussions around the Kerala semi-high–speed rail has highlighted the limitations of high-speed rail on broad gauge. Since most of the global high-speed rail infrastructure is built using the standard gauge, the cost benefits of using off-the-shelf rolling-stocks with minimal customizations and the availability of extensive, well proven technical know-how, are significant factors in favor of the high-speed rail on the standard gauge over the broad gauge, for cost sensitive rail markets in South Asia, especially in India.

== Gauges ==
=== 4 ft 10 7/8 in gauge ===
This gauge is used by the Toronto streetcar system and the Toronto subway.

=== 5 ft and 1520 mm gauge ===
This gauge was first used in the United Kingdom and the United States before it became the standard gauge for most railways in the former Soviet Union.

Russian gauge or CIS gauge 1,520 mm (4 ft 11 27/32 in) is the second most widely used gauge in the world, and spans the whole of the former Soviet Union/CIS bloc including the Baltic states and Mongolia. Finland uses 1,524 mm (5 ft). The difference is clearly lower than the tolerance margin, so through running is feasible. Care must be taken when servicing international trains because the wear profile of the wheels differs from that of trains that run on domestic tracks only.

When the Finnish rail network was founded in 1862, Finland was the Grand Duchy of Finland, an autonomous state ruled by the Imperial Russia. The first border crossing railway to Russia was opened in 1870, while the first to Sweden was not until 1919, so railways were built to the broad Russian track gauge of 1,524 mm (5 ft). In Russia, this gauge was re-standardized to 1,520 mm (4 ft 11 27/32 in) during the 1960s. Finland retained the original gauge with no re-standardisation.

=== Pennsylvania trolley gauges ===
5 ft 2 1/2 in (1,588 mm) and 5 ft 2 1/4 in (1,581 mm) are commonly known as Pennsylvania trolley gauge because it was originally used by railroad lines in the state of Pennsylvania. Unlike other broad gauges, it remains in use in a number of urban rail transit systems.

==== 5 ft 2 1/2 in (1,588 mm) ====
- New Orleans streetcars
- SEPTA (Southeastern Pennsylvania Transportation Authority)
  - Media–Sharon Hill Line suburban light rail line
- Pittsburgh Light Rail
- Streetcars in Cincinnati (1859–1951; standard gauge 2016–present)
- West Penn Railways (1904–1952 defunct)

==== 5 ft 2 1/4 in (1,581 mm) ====
- SEPTA (Southeastern Pennsylvania Transportation Authority)
  - Market–Frankford Line
  - Subway–surface trolley lines and Route 15 surface trolley line

=== 5 ft 3 in gauge ===
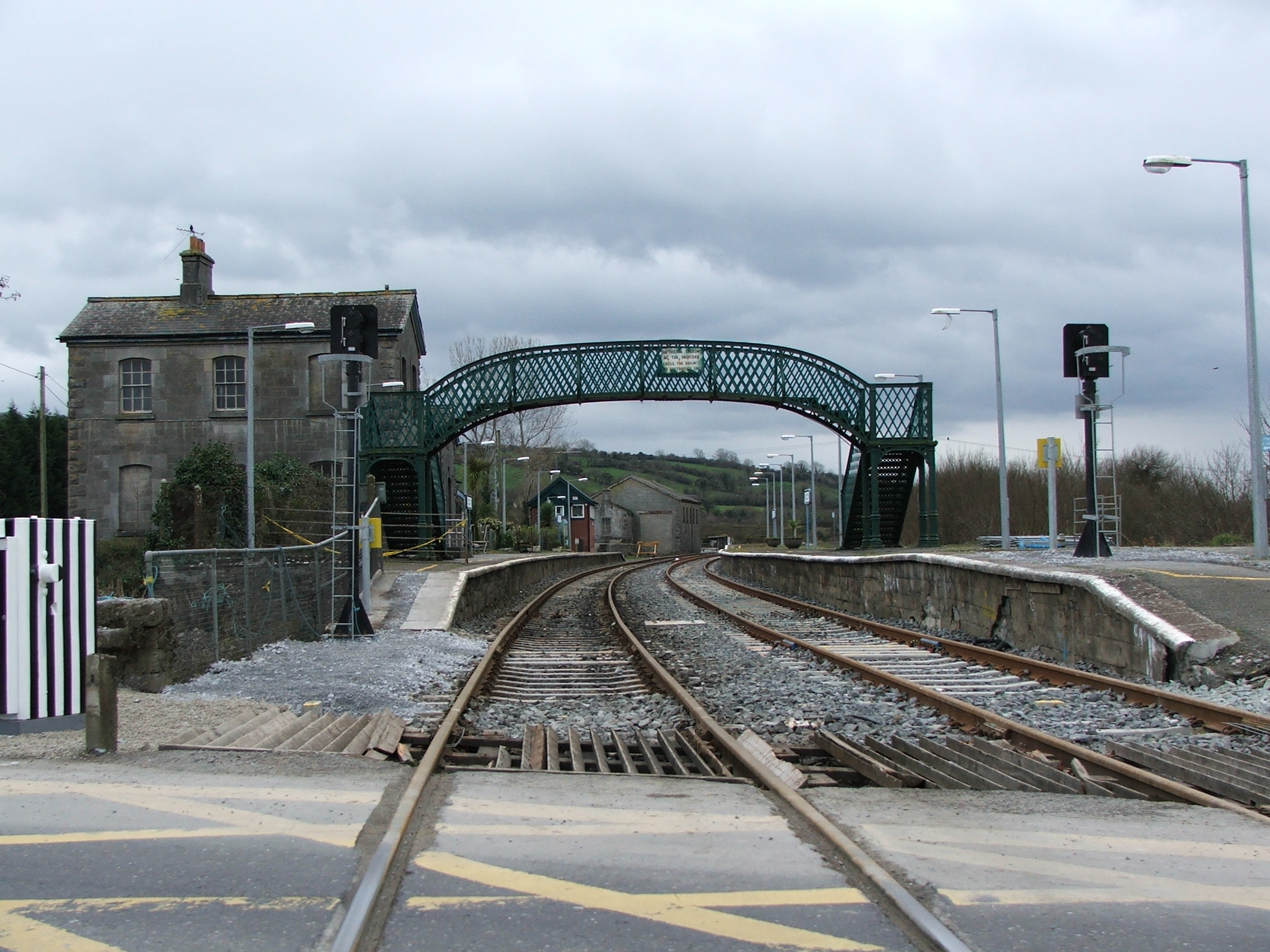
Irish 5 ft 3 in (1,600 mm) broad gauge tracks

As part of the railway gauge standardisation considered by the United Kingdom Parliamentary Gauge Commission, Ireland was allocated its own gauge, Irish gauge. Ireland then had three gauges, and the new standard would be a fourth.

The Irish gauge of 1600 mm (5 ft 3 in) is used in Ireland, the Brazilian states of Rio de Janeiro, São Paulo and Minas Gerais and the Australian states of Victoria and South Australia. Continuous standard-gauge tracks between Australia's mainland capital cities were implemented with the conversion of the last broad-gauge link, between Adelaide and Melbourne, in 1995.

=== 5 ft 4 1/2 in ===
This gauge was once used by the United Railways and Electric Company and the MTA Maryland, but is now used only by the Baltimore Streetcar Museum.

=== Iberian gauge ===
As finally established, the Iberian gauge of 1,668 mm (5 ft 5 21/32 in) is a compromise between the similar, but slightly different, gauges first adopted as respective national standards in Spain and Portugal in the mid-19th century. The main railway networks of Spain were initially constructed to a 1,672 mm (5 ft 5 13/16 in) gauge of six Castilian feet. Those of Portugal were initially built in standard gauge, but by 1864 were all converted to a 1,664 mm (5 ft 5 1/2 in) gauge of five Portuguese feet – close enough to allow interoperability in practice. The new high-speed network in Spain and Portugal uses standard gauge. The dual-gauge high-speed train RENFE Class 130 can change gauge at low speed without stopping.

=== 5 ft 6 in gauge ===
The 5 ft 6 in (1,676 mm) gauge was first used in Great Britain in Scotland for two short, isolated lines, the Dundee and Arbroath Railway (1836-1847) and the Arbroath and Forfar Railway (1838- ). Both the lines were subsequently converted to standard gauge and connected to the Scottish rail network.

Later this gauge was adopted as a standard for many British colonies such as Province of Canada and British India.

In 1851, the 5 ft 6 in (1,676 mm) broad gauge was officially adopted as the standard gauge for the Province of Canada, becoming known as the Provincial gauge, and government subsidies were unavailable for railways that chose other gauges. In the 1870s, mainly between 1872 and 1874, Canadian broad-gauge lines were changed to standard gauge to facilitate interchange and the exchange of rolling stock with American railways. Today, all Canadian railways are standard-gauge.

In US, this gauge was adopted for many lines, but soon fell out in favour of standard gauge. Today, only California's Bay Area Rapid Transit (BART) uses this gauge.

In British India, some standard gauge freight railways were built in initial period, though they were dismantled later. Later, in the 1850s, the gauge of 5 ft 6 in (1,676 mm) was adopted as standard for the nationwide network. Attempts to economize on the cost of construction led to the adoption of 1,000 mm (3 ft 3 3/8 in) gauge and then 2 ft 6 in (762 mm) and 2 ft (610 mm) narrow gauges for many secondary and branch lines. In the later part of the 20th century, due to interchangeability and maintenance issue, the railways in each of the countries in the Indian subcontinent began to convert all metre-gauge and narrow-gauge lines to this gauge. Today, the nationwide rail network in Pakistan and Sri Lanka are entirely on this gauge, whereas India, under Project Unigauge, and Bangladesh are still undergoing gauge conversion.

This gauge is the widest gauge in regular passenger use in the world.

=== Broader gauges ===
Gualala River Railroad with broad gauge track and locomotive number 2, S.H. Harmon

Some railways in the United States were laid with a gauge of 6 ft (1,829 mm). The Gualala River Railroad operated 5 feet 8 1/2 inches (1,740 mm) tracks for a logging railroad.

Some industrial uses require still broader gauges, such as:

- Large telescopes and telescope arrays.
- Launch pads – The European Space Agency, Roscosmos, NASA and SpaceX use double-track railways to move rockets and supporting equipment at launch sites
- Gantry cranes
- Funiculars, Incline elevator and Canal inclined planes

==== Gallery ====
Very broad gauges

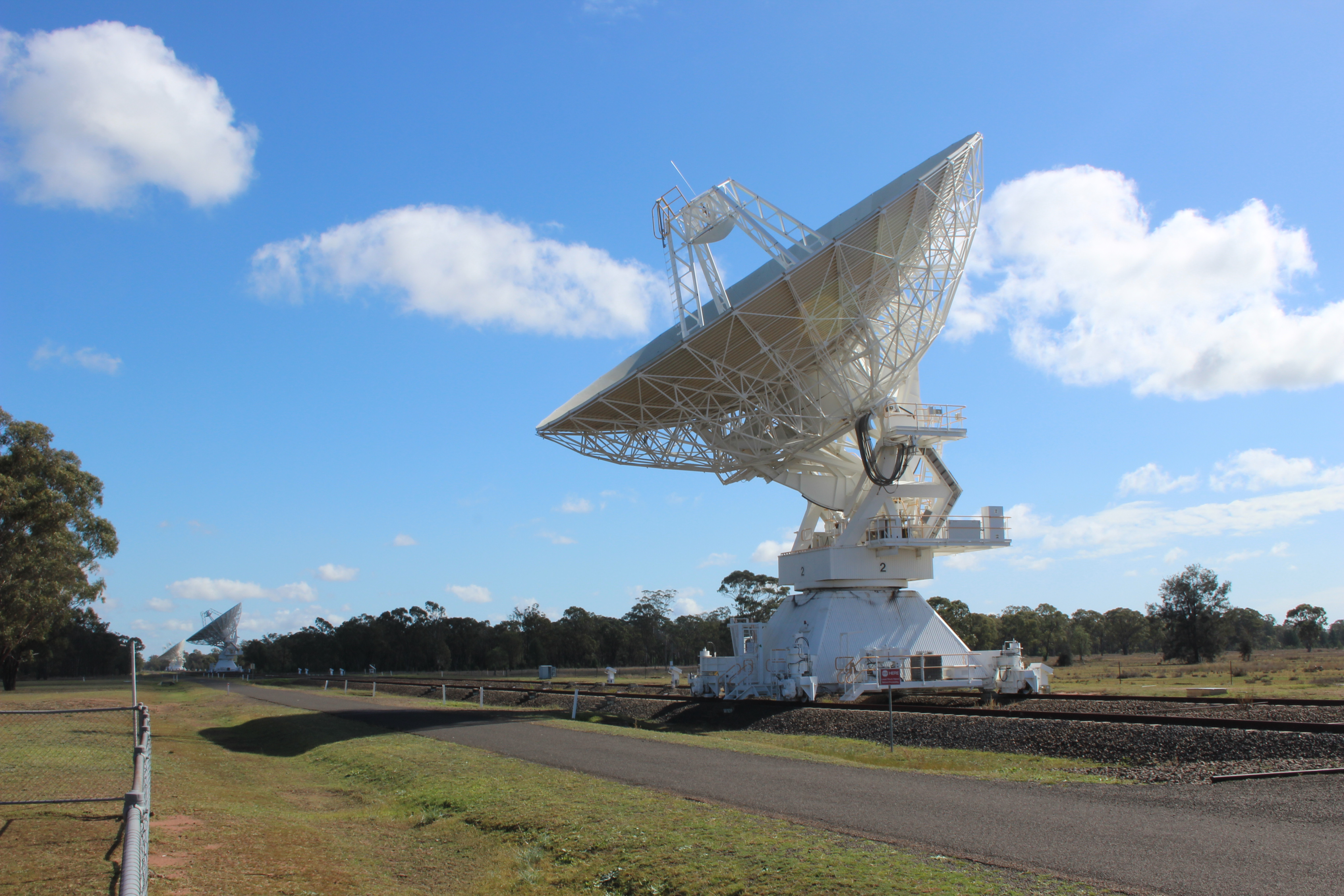
Broad gauge track for CSIRO Australia Telescope in Narrabri

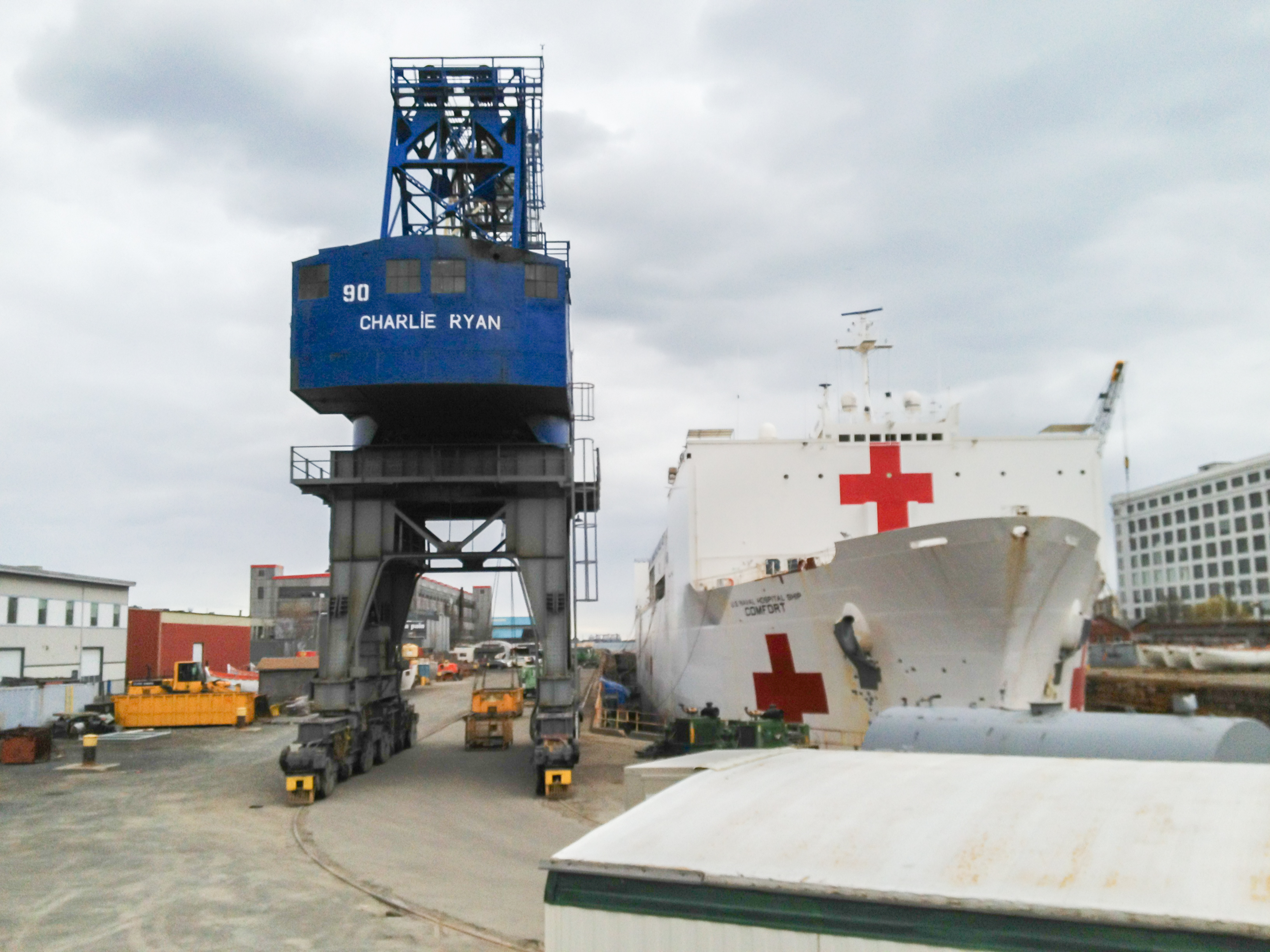
Dockside crane on wide gauge tracks at the former South Boston Naval Annex's Dry Dock Number 3

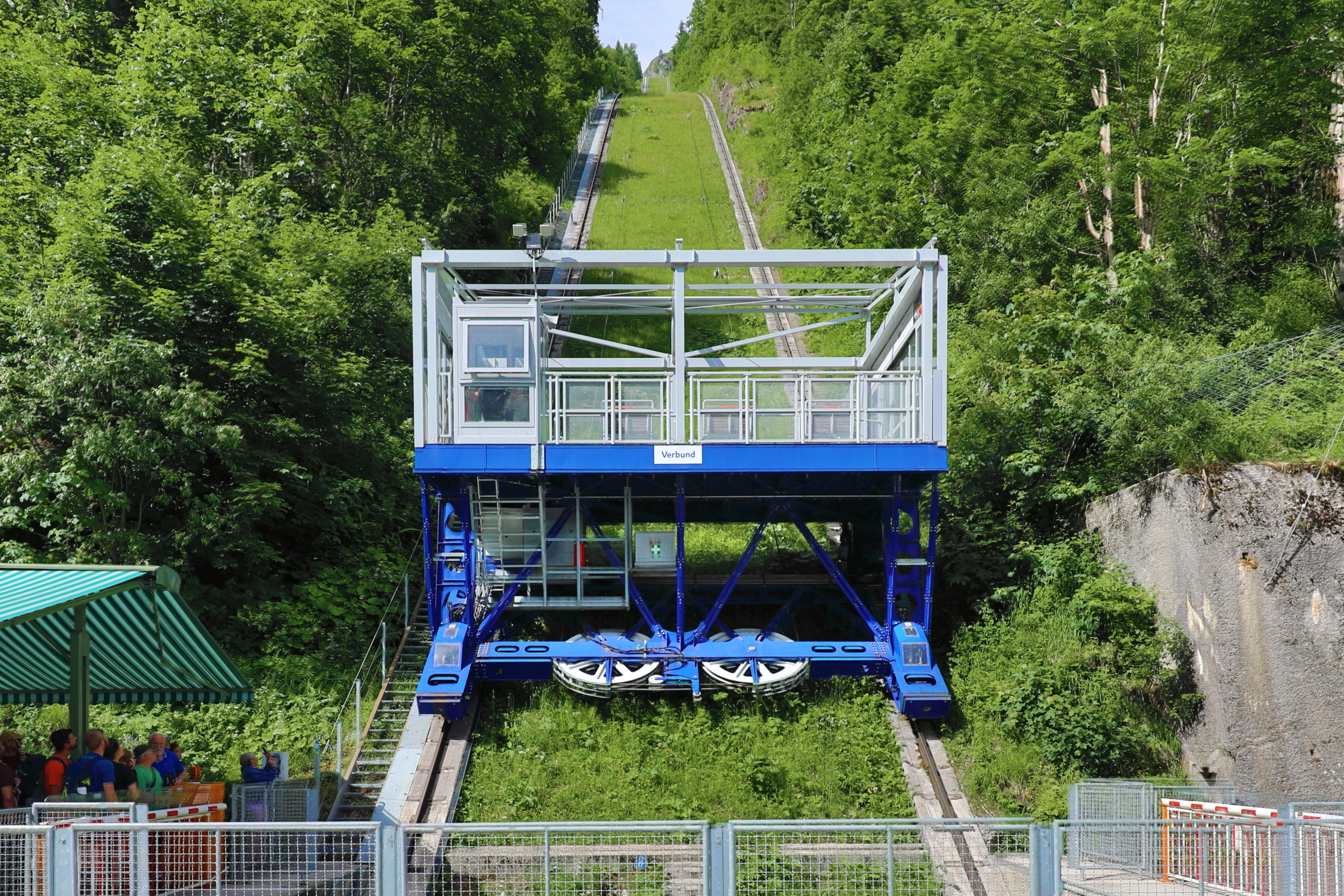
The Lärchwandschrägaufzug in Kaprun, Austria has a gauge of 8,200 mm (26 ft 10 27/32 in)

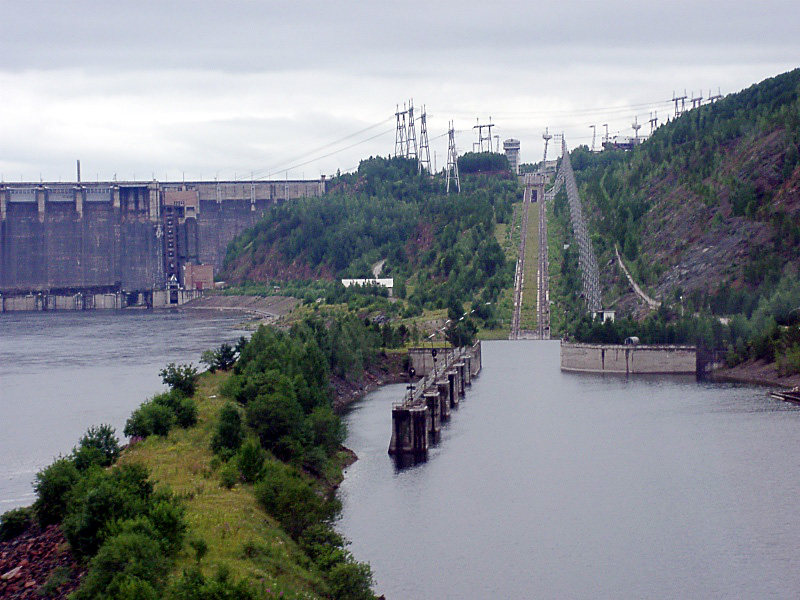
The Krasnoyarsk Dam's inclined plane is an electric rack railway having gauge of 9,000 mm (29 ft 6 5/16 in), making it the widest gauge railway of any type in the world

These applications might use double track of the country's usual gauge to provide the necessary stability and axle load. These applications may also use much heavier than normal rails, the heaviest rails for trains being about 70 kg/m (141 lb/yd). Vehicles on these gauges generally operate at very low speeds.

== See also ==
- Breitspurbahn
- List of track gauges
- List of tram systems by gauge and electrification
- Ramsey car-transfer apparatus
- Track gauge
