= Baltimore Streetcar Museum =

Streetcar museum in Baltimore, Maryland

Coordinates: 39°18′42″N 76°37′12″W

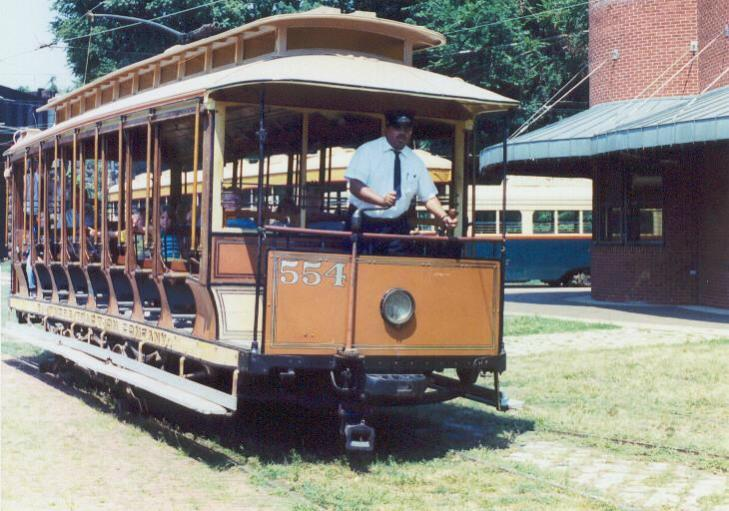
- An 1896 open car in operation at the Baltimore Streetcar Museum
- Established: June 8, 1966; 60 years ago
- Location: 1911 Falls Road, Baltimore, Maryland, 21211
- Key holdings: Operating streetcars
- Website: www.baltimorestreetcar.org www.baltimorestreetcarmuseum.org

The Baltimore Streetcar Museum (BSM) is a 501(c)(3) nonprofit museum. It is located at 1911 Falls Road (MD 25) in Baltimore, Maryland. The museum is dedicated to preserving Baltimore's public transportation history, especially the streetcar era.

== Exhibits and displays ==
=== Operating streetcars ===
During public operations, the Baltimore Streetcar Museum offers rides to visitors on various streetcars including:

==== Car #1050 ====
Brownell "Accelerator" car built in 1898 for Baltimore Consolidated Railway Company. Later converted to safety instruction use, in which United Railways & Electric Company paraded the car around the system whilst advertising, advocating, and inspecting for proper safety along the line and in the car houses.

==== Car #3828 ====
United Railways & Electric Company owned car, built in 1902 by J.G. Brill Company. The order was originally placed with the Brownell Car Company, but was only fulfilled after Brill bought out Brownell. Ordered in tandem with Car #1164. Later rebuilt by the transit company in 1923, having its front and rear operating decks enclosed, due to city and union demands. This was the heaviest class of Baltimore Streetcar to operate with handbrakes only.

==== Car #25 ====
A first-year Baltimore City Passenger Railway horse car, built in 1859. Built by the Poole & Hunt Company, this car could seat 22 passengers when in service. After being decommissioned on an unknown date, the car changed hands multiple times until it bought by a local family, who used it as a beach cabana and storage shed. After 68 years of use as a shed, the family gifted the car to the Baltimore Streetcar Museum in 1971.

==== Car #264 ====
United Railways and Electric Company convertible model built in 1900 by the Brownell Car Company. The car has hand brakes only.

==== Car #4533 ====
United Railways and Electric Company One-Man Safety model, built as a handbrake two-man car in 1904 by J. G. Brill Company, rebuilt by UR&E as a one-man safety car in 1924, rebuilt again by BTCo as a Company rail conductivity testing car and renumbered 3550, lasting in service until 1963; Returned to its 1924 appearance in a 2010s Museum restoration. This was the first car at the Baltimore Streetcar Museum to move under its own power.

==== Car #6119 ====
United Railways and Electric Company Peter Witt streetcar model, built in 1930 by J. G. Brill Company. A predecessor of the PCC car and about equal to one in every respect; In service until 1955.

==== Car #7407 ====
Baltimore Transit Company Presidents' Conference Committee (PCC) streetcar, built by the Pullman Company. At present this is the only regularly operating Pullman PCC in any museum. This car was built in 1944, and became the very last streetcar to turn a revenue wheel for BTC on November 3, 1963.

==== Car #2168 ====
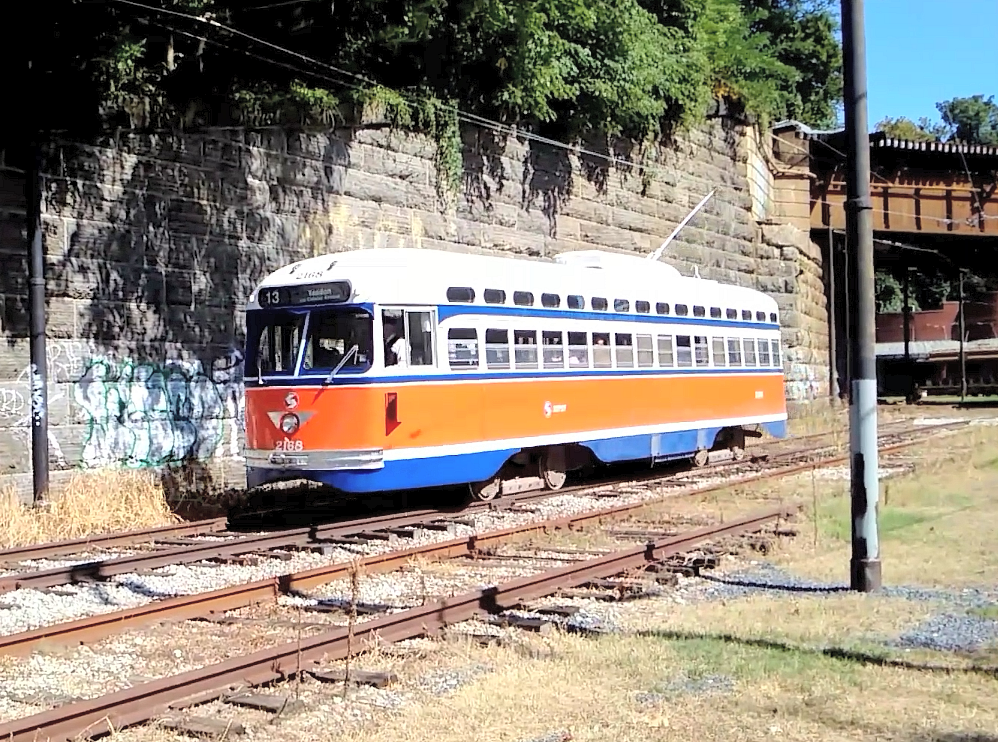
SEPTA PCC streetcar #2168 running on Museum tracks in 2019

Philadelphia SEPTA PCC streetcar placed in service at the Museum in September 2009. This car was built by the St. Louis Car Co. for the Philadelphia Transportation Company in 1947, and lasted in SEPTA service until 1992.

==== Car #1164 ====
United Railways and Electric Company 12-bench open Brill 22-A model, built in 1902 by J. G. Brill Company. This car is also handbrake only. This car was recently restored circa 2020.

==== Car #554 ====
Baltimore traction company car 554, a Brownell Car Company 9-bench open summer car built in 1896, this car is handbrake only, this car had a 5-year restoration completed in the summer of 2018.

==== Car #417 ====
Built by the Baltimore City Passenger Railway as a horse car, later re-built as a cable car trailer, and finally into an electric car in 1895, is the Museum's newest restoration. This car operates on special occasions and is reported to be the oldest operating electric streetcar in America.

==== Car #7303 ====
Originally built as #503 in 1936 by St. Louis Car Company, this car spent the first ~12 years of its life working for the San Diego Electric Railway Company. In 1949, San Diego got rid of its streetcar system, and sold 503 to El Paso City Lines in 1950, where the car was renumbered as 1503. There the car remained in service for roughly another 20 years until the early 1970s when various disputes and complications caused the El Paso-Ciudad Juárez line to shut down. The car remained in a scrap pile for an untold period of time until changing hands for a third time, being bought out by a real estate company in Cloudcroft, New Mexico, who elected to use the car as an office. Despite major alterations, the car body remained mostly intact. This led the Baltimore Streetcar Museum to take notice of the car when the real estate property was put up for sale, circa 2002. Further investigation into the car realized that it was almost identical to a number of Baltimore Transit Company 7300-series PCCs, and that it was one of vanishingly few first-year PCCs still intact. Recognizing that the car could have been built in the same facilities, or even on the same assembly lines as numerous Baltimore PCCs, the museum elected to purchase the car and shipped it home to Baltimore, where it is now being restored. The Museum chose to renumber it as 7303, since it was most similar to the Baltimore 7300 series, and the "03" was kept as a tribute to the car's history. The original Baltimore Transit Co. #7303 was scrapped after a tragic and unknown accident. Interestingly enough, 7303 was found to be missing much of its rear end bracing when it first arrived at the museum, suggesting that it was also subject to a crash, although a less major one. Once operational, 7303 will be one of the oldest operable PCC Cars in the world, only behind its forerunners by a few months.

==== Car #2187 ====
Both built by St. Louis Car Co. in 1948, the history of this car closely mirrors that of car #2168. However, the histories diverge at the crucial point of SEPTA's General Overhaul (GOH) program. While 2168 was refurbished for further passenger use, 2194 and its sister, 2187, were modified for Overhead Line Repair in the subway portion of the system. 2187 was retired from use with SEPTA in 2005, and was sent off to the Baltimore Streetcar Museum (BSM), who repainted in BSM colors..

==== Car #C-145 ====
Built by the Brill Company in 1923, C-145 was part of multiple orders for more than 520 pieces of surface passenger equipment ordered by the Philadelphia Rapid Transit Company from that city’s J.G. Brill Company in 1923. This imposing car was built for sweeping and plowing snow during all but the most severe storms, although the car's plow was removed at some point. The revolving brush component, however, remains. This car endured nearly fifty years of service, only being decommissioned in 1970. It is the heaviest car in the Museum's collection, weighing in at 74,000 pounds.

==== Santa's Streetcar ====
In December, the Museum holds a "Santa's Streetcar" event on two weekends, decorating one of the streetcars in Christmas finery as Santa Claus welcomes children.

=== Machine shop ===
The machine shop at the Baltimore Streetcar Museum is one of the largest and well equipped shops of any streetcar museum in the United States. In many instances, parts for Baltimore Streetcar Museum and other museums are custom fabricated.

=== Library collection ===
The Baltimore Streetcar Museum houses the library collections of the Baltimore Streetcar Museum and the National Railway Historical Society (Baltimore Chapter), formally known as Maryland Rail Heritage Library.

=== Additional information ===
The Museum's website has detailed information about its operational equipment, as well as vehicles awaiting restoration (see Collection Highlights). Also provided are illustrations of surviving Baltimore area sites from the city's once-extensive streetcar network.

== Volunteer operating staff ==
The Museum's streetcar operations is handled by an all-volunteer staff, composed exclusively of Museum members. Training is provided by the Museum's Training Department during a formal eleven week educational program. Recruitment is periodically advertised through the Museum's newsletter which all Museum members receive.

== Museum rentals ==
The Baltimore Streetcar Museum is also available for private parties. The BSM's Visitor Center facilities feature an auditorium, the "Trolley Theatre," streetcar rides, and tours of the carhouse, where visitors view other historical transit equipment, such as an 1859 horse car, a crane car, and an electric bus, known as a trackless trolley or trolleybus.

== History ==
The Baltimore Streetcar Museum was founded as a nonprofit organization on June 8, 1966, by several members of the Baltimore Chapter of the National Railroad Historical Society. The City of Baltimore agreed to build the museum and lease it to the nonprofit organization for one dollar per year. The groundbreaking ceremony was held on November 4, 1967. Opening day was August 30, 1968.

The original Museum collection consisted of equipment used by the former United Railways and Electric Company and Baltimore Transit Company (BTCO) services, which was held for a short time, the Maryland Historical Society after Baltimore ceased streetcar service. The collection was moved from what was at the time Robert E. Lee Park, near Lake Roland, in 1968 to the present Falls Road Maryland and Pennsylvania Railroad site and public operations began in July 1970. Before public operations could commence, many hours of volunteer work were necessary to build operating track and install overhead wire which, at first, provided only a short ride for visitors.

Over the years, the Museum has incrementally extended its line along Falls Road that includes now turning loops at the north and south ends of its line. Completion of the Museum's entire streetcar line was realized in October 2008 with the completion of its double tracking project, which took many years to complete. The track gauge continues to be the unique 5 ft 4 1/2 in (1,638 mm) one used by original Baltimore streetcar lines.

== Streetcar service ==
Baltimore Streetcar Museum

Technical
- Track gauge: 5 ft 4 1/2 in (1,638 mm)
- Electrification: (570-600) V DC trolley wire

A track providing service at the museum is identified by the Maryland Transit Administration as LocalLink 25. At one time, the United Railways and Electric Company route was the Route 25 line on Falls Road, past the current site of the Museum.

== See also ==
- National Capital Trolley Museum (in Silver Spring, Maryland)
- Baltimore City Passenger Railway
- Baltimore Light RailLink
- History of MTA Maryland
- United Railways and Electric Company
