= Gualala, California =

Unincorporated community in California, United States

Gualala
- Unincorporated community
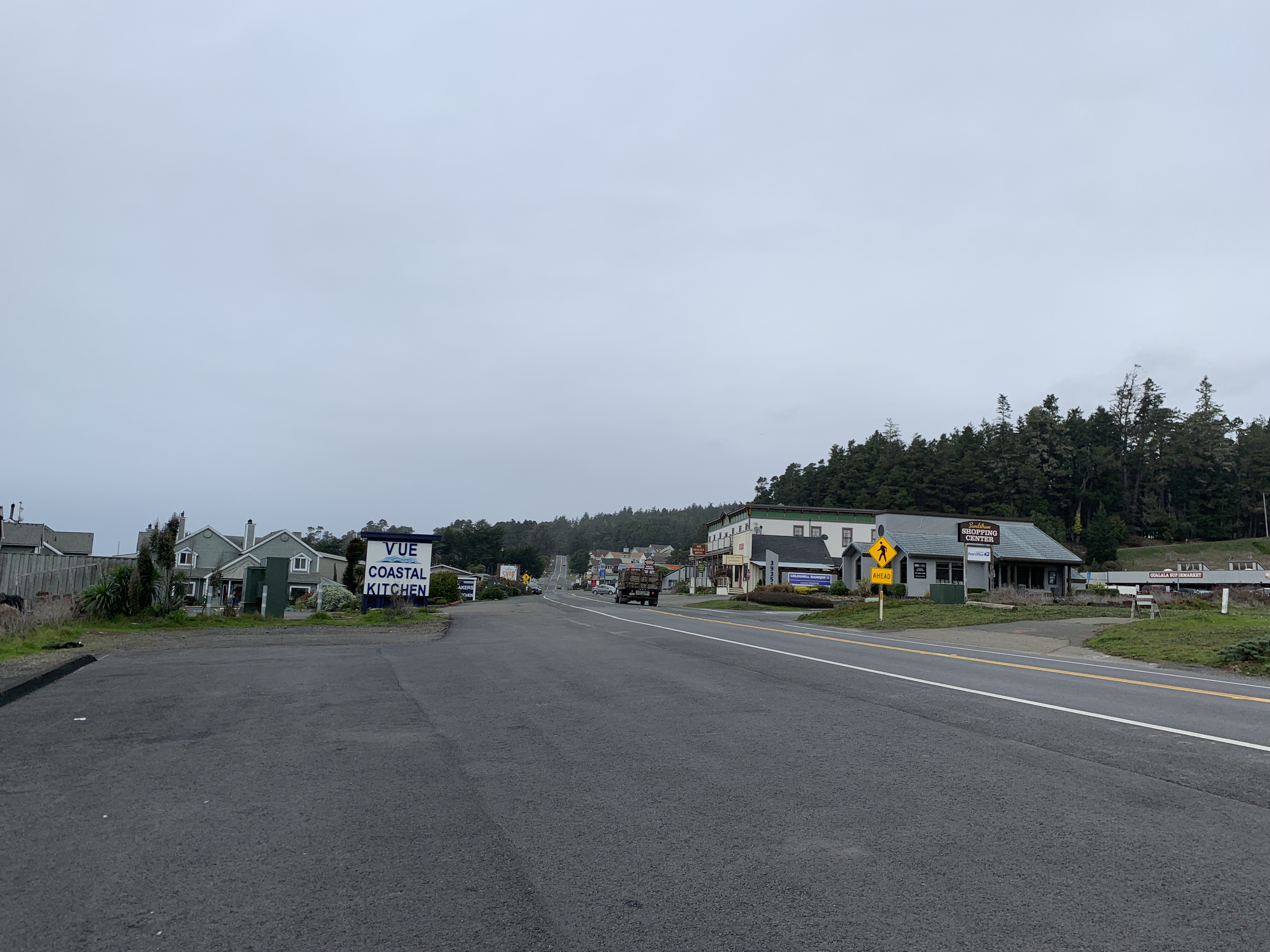
- Street view of Gualala

- Location in California Gualala (the United States)
- Coordinates: 38°45′57″N 123°31′41″W
- Country: United States
- State: California
- County: Mendocino
- Elevation: 49 ft (15 m)

Population (2010)
  - Total: 2,093
  - Median Age: 53.9 (male) / 51.8 (female)
- Time zone: UTC-8 (Pacific)
  - Summer (DST): UTC-7 (PDT)
- ZIP code: 95445
- Area code: 707
- FIPS code: 06-31428
- GNIS feature ID: 224701
- Website: gualala.com

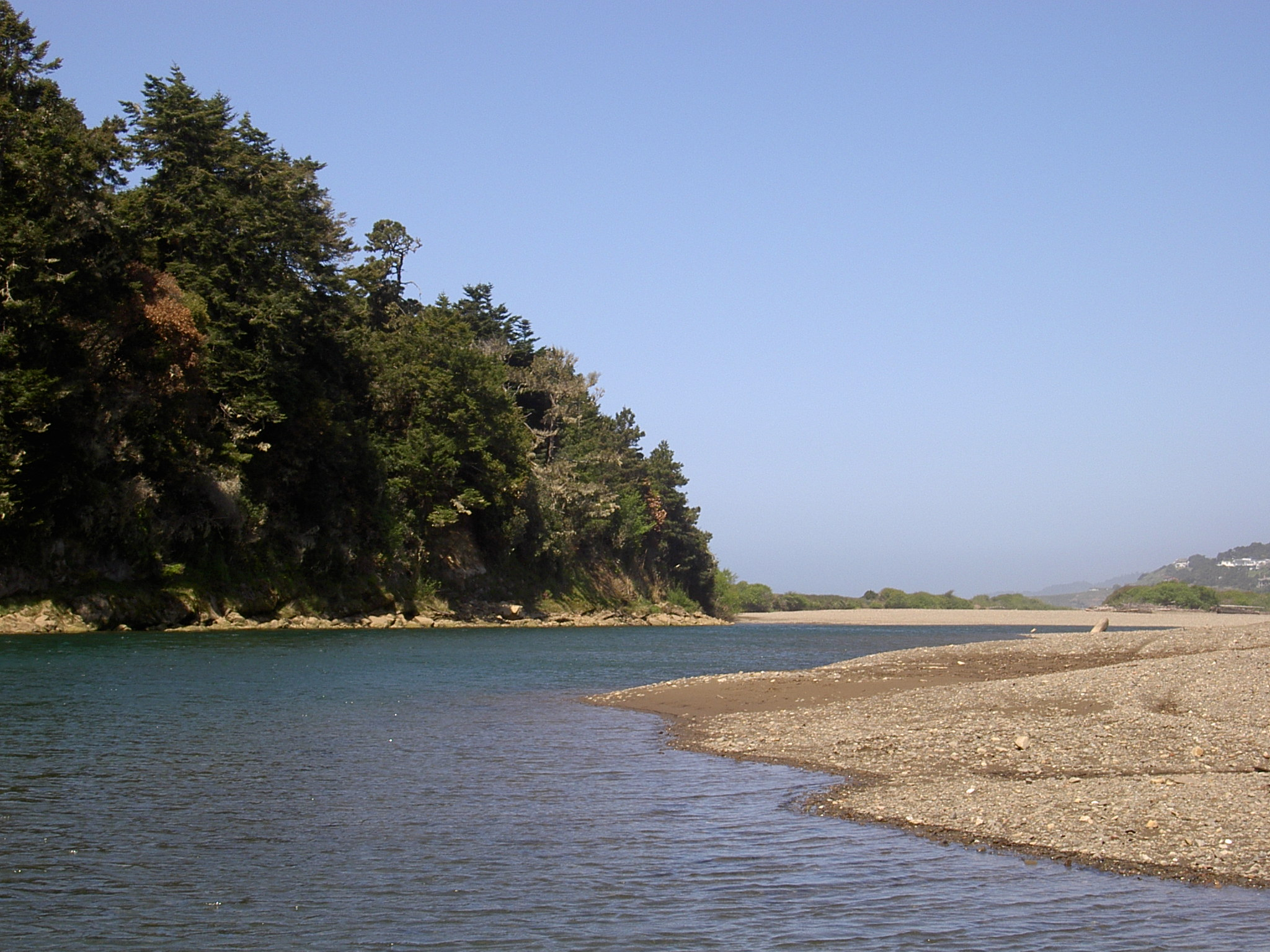
The mouth of the Gualala River near California State Route 1

Gualala (/wəˈlɑː.lə/ wə-LAH-lə; Pomo: Qh awála-li) is an unincorporated community in Mendocino County in the U.S. state of California. It is located north of The Sea Ranch and south of Point Arena, California. Gualala shares its southern border with the southern border of Mendocino County. It is located on the Pacific coast at the mouth of the Gualala River, on State Route 1. It serves as a commercial center for the surrounding area. Gualala was once a logging town, but tourism is now its central economic activity.

== Etymology ==
Gualala derives from the Kashaya Pomo village name Walaali, which itself is taken from Qh awála-li, meaning "where the water goes down". Gualala is the Spanish spelling; obsolete English-influenced variants include Walhalla (influenced by Walhalla of Norse mythology), Wallala and Wallholla.

== History ==
=== Native peoples ===
The Native peoples who occupied this area were known as the latcupda. They were a small entity of the bokeya group of Pomo peoples.

=== Mexican era ===
Though both the Spanish and the Russians attempted to colonize northern California in the early 18th century, few people made incursions into the region until the 1840s. In 1844, Alta California Governor Manuel Micheltorena granted General Rafael Garcia 62.5 square miles (162 km^{2}) of land between the Gualala River and Mal Paso Creek. Garcia used the land to graze cattle. After Mexico was forced to cede California as a result of its loss of the Mexican-American War, the Board of California Land Commissioners examined Garcia's claim to the land under the California Land Act of 1851. The Board invalidated Garcia's claim in 1854 on a technicality. This made Garcia's land available for sale through the United States government as public land.

=== Lumber ===
Cyrus D. Robinson and his family were among the first American settlers to build on the lands of the invalidated Garcia land grant. Sources conflict on the exact year of their arrival, but by 1862, he had sold part of the land to Webber and Rutherford so they could build a lumber mill in China Gulch, a small drainage near the mouth of the Gualala River. The town of Gualala quickly grew to support company operations. The lumber mills processed redwood trees felled in nearby forests. In 1868, Webber and Rutherford sold to Zemri Heywood and Samuel Harmon. Heywood and Harmon then constructed a second mill on a river flat on a large bend near the mouth of the Gualala River. This mill, informally known as Heywood's Mill, formed the backbone of Gualala's economy for its approximately 40-year tenure. At its peak, the mill produced 175,000 board feet of lumber per day. Heywood's Mill burned down in a fire on September 14, 1906.

Initially, the mill transported lumber by a team of draft horses and a wide-gauge railway to "Robinson Point"., where a wire chute loaded ships. In later years, a wide gauge railroad replaced animals as motive power. This railroad is noted as one of the widest-gauge railroads in the United States, measuring 68.5 inches wide. Soon after 1872, Robinson's wire chute gave way to nearby Bourn's Landing (pronounced "bones"), due to the comparatively safer anchorage at that location. The mill company extended the railway to this location, and the area's goods primarily came through this location until automobiles began to render shipping obsolete in the early 1920s.

=== Town development ===
In 1861, Cyrus Robinson filed a claim under the Land Act of 1820 for much of the area which is now the town of Gualala. They soon built a hotel, a saloon and a ferry. They also supervised the post office (which was also the stage stop), the Wells Fargo Express and the Western Union. By the end of the 1800s, Gualala had become a major commercial hub for the entire area, with a dancing school, the Gualala Municipal Brass Band, and an opera house.

The hotel burned down in a fire in 1903. It was rebuilt to the south of its original location at a cost of $6,000. In 1907, Mark Pedotti and Antonio Ciapusci bought the Gualala Hotel property which included 636 acres and between them they divided the property with Ciapusci acquiring the area of Gualala. His son George and wife Ida inherited the land after his death in 1932.

Today, tourists come to nearby Sea Ranch, for which Gualala provides tourist and commercial services.

=== Climate ===
According to the Köppen Climate Classification system, Gualala has a warm-summer Mediterranean climate, abbreviated "Csb" on climate maps.

Climate data for Gualala / Sea Ranch (1980-2016)
Month	Jan	Feb	Mar	Apr	May	Jun	Jul	Aug	Sep	Oct	Nov	Dec	Year
Mean daily maximum °F (°C)	56.5 (13.6)	59.7 (15.4)	61.5 (16.4)	64.5 (18.1)	67.5 (19.7)	71.0 (21.7)	73.0 (22.8)	74.0 (23.3)	72.8 (22.7)	68.3 (20.2)	61.3 (16.3)	56.0 (13.3)	65.5 (18.6)
Mean daily minimum °F (°C)	42.0 (5.6)	43.7 (6.5)	45.0 (7.2)	46.3 (7.9)	48.8 (9.3)	50.8 (10.4)	51.0 (10.6)	51.0 (10.6)	50.8 (10.4)	48.0 (8.9)	45.7 (7.6)	42.0 (5.6)	47.1 (8.4)
Average precipitation inches (mm)	6.5 (170)	6.4 (160)	4.73 (120)	2.2 (56)	1 (25)	0.33 (8.4)	0.05 (1.3)	0.08 (2.0)	0.43 (11)	1.98 (50)	4.5 (110)	6.56 (167)	34.76 (880.7)
Average precipitation days	13	10	12	7	4	1	0	1	2	4	10	12	76
Source 1: weatherspark
Source 2: bestplaces.net

== Government ==
In the California State Legislature, Gualala is in the 2nd senatorial district, represented by Democrat Mike McGuire, and the 2nd Assembly district, represented by Democrat Chris Rogers.

In the United States House of Representatives, Gualala is in California's 2nd congressional district, represented by Democrat Jared Huffman.

== Education ==
There were no schools in the area until 1883, when a single-room schoolhouse was constructed with the support of the Heywood family. Until that time, it was a common custom to send children to live with other families in larger areas to attend school.

Elementary school students are educated at Horicon Elementary School in Annapolis in Sonoma County, or Arena Union Elementary in Point Arena. High school students are educated at Point Arena High School.

== Notable person ==
- Peggy Berryhill, Muscogee broadcast journalist

== See also ==
- Gualala River
- Ranchos of California
- The Sea Ranch
