= MEDICC =

US-based non-profit organization

MEDICC logo

MEDICC (Medical Education Cooperation with Cuba) is a non-profit organization founded in 1997 that works to enhance cooperation among the US, Cuban and global health communities through its programs.

MEDICC supports education and development of human resources in health committed to equitable access and quality care, providing the Cuban experience to inform global debate, practice, policies and cooperation in health.

== History ==
MEDICC was founded in 1997 to foster communication and cooperation between the United States and Cuban medical and public health communities, with the aim of promoting health equity by studying evidence from Cuba.

From 1997–2004, MEDICC built a program around the medical and public health schools in the two countries, which generated new collaborations in research, teaching, clinical practice, and health policy. For several years, MEDICC's core program constituted elective courses in Cuba for US medical, public health and nursing students, with an academic council composed equally of US and Cuban medical educators overseeing course content.

By 2004, nearly 1,000 students from 125 US medical, nursing, and public health schools had traveled to Cuba for two- to eight-week courses—mainly placing students with family physicians throughout the island. A number of faculty members and health professionals also traveled to Cuba to research the country's health system model. In 2004, when the administration of George W. Bush suspended student travel to Cuba, MEDICC was forced to eliminate the student exchange and other student-faculty travel programs.

== Publications ==
=== Writings and Broadcasts by MEDICC Board, Staff & Scholars ===
- "9 Ways for US to Talk to Cuba and for Cuba to Talk to US"—Bourne, Peter G. January, 2009. Center for Democracy in the Americas.
- "Salud Para Todo: Cuba’s Revolutionary Approach Towards the Fulfillment of the Right to Health"—Evans, Dabney P. 2008. In Patricia Cholewka, Mitra M Motlagh (Editors), Health Capital and Sustainable Socioeconomic Development(chapter 15) Taylor & Francis, CRC Press
- "Cuba's HIV/AIDS Strategy: An Integrated, Rights-Based Approach"—Gorry, C. Oxfam, July 2008.
- "La estrategia cubana de respuesta al VIH/sida: Un enfoque integral con base en los derechos"—Gorry, C. Oxfam, julio 2008.
- "An Interview with C. William Keck, M.D., M.P.H., F.A.C.P.M. and Gail Reed, M.S." Social Medicine in Practice, Vol 3 No.1, January 2008
- "Cast of thousands: Cuba's contribution to global health"—Gorry, C. HealthLink. March 2007;143.
- Natural and Traditional Medicine in Cuba: Lessons for U.S. Medical Education—Appelbaum, D., Kligler, B., Barrett, B., Frenkel, M., Guerrera, M.P., Kondwani, K.A., Lee, B.B. & Tattelman, E. Academic Medicine, 2006;81(12):1098-103.

=== Writings by MEDICC's Professional Bridges Participants ===
- UCSF Faculty Get Insiders' Look at Cuban Health Care System—Robin Hindery, UCSF Today, January 2009
- Medical Education & Health Equity: An Opportunity for the New Administration—Fitzhugh Mullan, MD, Murdock Head Professor of Medicine and Health Policy, Professor of Pediatrics, George Washington University, Washington DC, Health Affairs, The Policy Journal of the Health Sphere, December 2008
- Integrating health and human security into foreign policy: Cuba's Surprising Success—Robert Huish and Jerry Spiegel, The International Journal of Cuban Studies, Volume 1, Issue 1, June 2008
- Can Lessons Learned from a Cuban Experience Improve Health Disparities in South Los Angeles?—Fred Dominguez, MD, MPH & Alex N. Ortega, PhD, Ethnicity & Disease, Volume 18, Spring 2008
- "Going where no doctor has gone before: the role of Cuba's Latin American School of Medicine in meeting the needs of some of the world's most vulnerable populations"—Robert Huish, PhD, Journal of the Royal Institute of Public Health, 2008 Jun;122(6):552-7. Epub 2008 May 7
- "Disaster Preparedness: My Lessons Learned from Cuba"—Amelia Muccio, Director of Disaster Planning, New Jersey Primary Care Association, Hamilton, New Jersey, NJPCA & NJSORH Quarterly Newsletter, Winter 2008
- "Cuban Medical Internationalism and the Development of the Latin American School of Medicine"—Robert Huish and John M. Kirk (2007), Latin American Perspectives, 34; 77
- "Lessons from the Cuban Healthcare and Medical Education Systems"—Theodore C. Friedman, MD, Associate Professor of Medicine-UCLA School of Medicine, Charles R. Drew University of Medicine and Science, The Charles R. Drew The RCMI-faculty Development Core, July 2007
- "International Health Diplomacy: Examining the Cuban Model"—Jessica Evert, MD and Thomas Novotny, MD, University of California, San Francisco School of Medicine, April 2007
- "Correspondence from Abroad: The Cuban Paradox"—Susan E. Birch MBA, RN & Linda Norlander MS, RN AJN, American Journal of Nursing, Volume 107 Number 3, March 2007
- "The Cuban Health Care System"—Matthew Anderson, MD, MSc, Professor Family & Social Medicine, Albert Einstein College of Medicine, Bronx, NY. The Social Medicine Portal, January 2006
- "Change in Cuban Social Work Education: Government Response to Emerging Societal Problems"—David L. Strug, Ph.D., Professor, Social Work, Wurzweiler School of Social Work, Yeshiva University, Cuba Today: Continuity and Change since the "Periodico Especial" Bildner Center for Hemisphere Studies, The Graduate Center, CUNY, October 2004.
