= Gualala River =

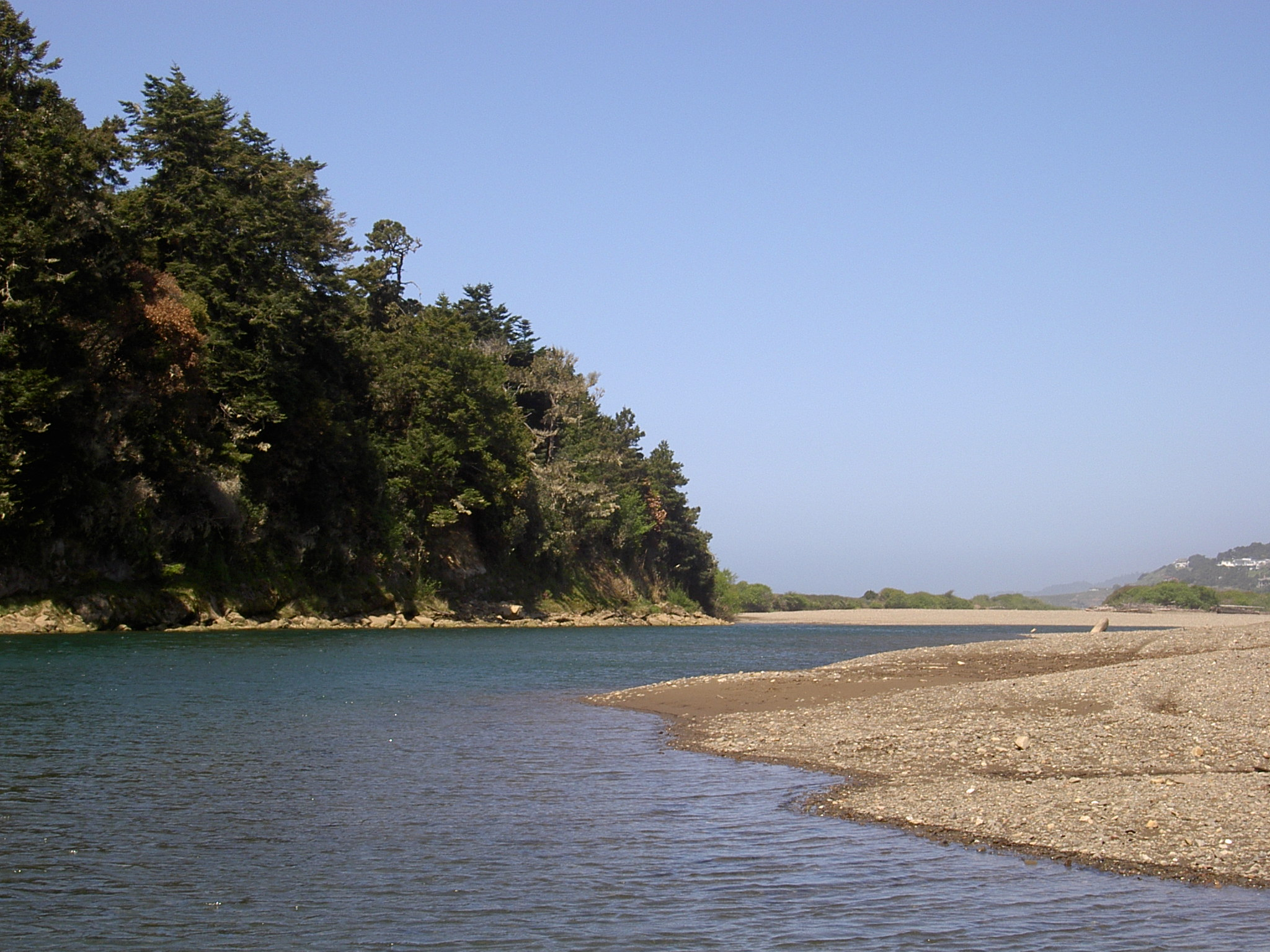
- The Gualala River near its mouth

- Location of the mouth of the Gualala River in California

Location
- Country: United States
- State: California
- Region: Sonoma County, Mendocino County
- City: Gualala, California

Physical characteristics
- Source: South Fork Gualala River
  - location: Mohrhardt Ridge
  - coordinates: 38°34′17″N 123°10′3″W
  - elevation: 1,880 ft (570 m)
- 2nd source: North Fork/Billings Creek
  - location: Snook Mountain
  - coordinates: 38°50′46″N 123°19′56″W
  - elevation: 1,840 ft (560 m)
- Source confluence: confluence
  - location: 2 mi (3 km) northeast of Gualala, California
  - coordinates: 38°46′42″N 123°29′56″W
  - elevation: 23 ft (7.0 m)
- Mouth: Pacific Ocean
  - location: west of Gualala, California
  - coordinates: 38°46′7″N 123°32′2″W
  - elevation: 0 ft (0 m)
- Length: 3.4 mi (5.5 km)confluence to mouth
- Basin size: 298 sq mi (770 km^{2})

The Gualala River is a river on the northern coast of California. Most of the river is in Sonoma County, but a portion is in Mendocino County. The headwaters of the 40-mile-long (64 km) river (measuring via its South Fork) are high in the Coast Range, and it empties into the Pacific Ocean. For its last few miles, it forms the boundary between Sonoma County and Mendocino County.

== Name ==
The Gualala River was previously known as the Valhalla River, but the name was changed sometime between 1877 and 1921.

John Sutter's militia captain Ernest Rufus is credited with naming the river. There is disagreement about whether the name is originated from the Pomo word Walali meaning where the waters meet or English for What Water read The Law. (Que Agua Le La Ley) In Kashaya Pomo, the river is known as qʰawala·li.

== Three forks ==
The river has three forks: the South Fork, Wheatfield Fork and the North Fork. The South Fork is the longest and travels northwest, parallel to the coast along the San Andreas Fault rift zone. The Wheatfield Fork begins west of Lake Sonoma and has the largest flow of the three forks. Its tributaries include Tombs, Wolf, House, Haupt and Fuller creeks. Wheatfield is the first fork to combine with the South Fork. Buckeye Creek, a tributary of the river, joins the South Fork next. It is followed by Rockpile Creek and Big Pepperwod Creek. The North Fork is the only part of the river in Mendocino County. It travels roughly southwest towards the coast along the San Andreas Fault rift zone and meets the South Fork at the border between the counties, a few miles before the river flows into the ocean.

== Watershed ==
The mountainous watershed has an area of about 298 square miles (770 km^{2}), three quarters of it in Sonoma County and one quarter in Mendocino County. Rainfall varies from 38 inches (970 mm) per year at the coast to 70 inches (1,800 mm) inland. The watershed is sparsely populated. Timber production is the predominant land use, historically and currently. Grazing was previously important but has become less prevalent.

The river provides recreation, municipal and industrial water supply for the community of Gualala, California, and wildlife habitat including cold freshwater habitat for fish migration and spawning. The most important problem for the watershed is excessive erosion. The area has a high degree of natural erosion because of uplift and displacement caused by the San Andreas Fault, which runs through the area. However, logging and roads have greatly increased the amount of sedimentation in the river. Kelly Road, which runs between Lake Sonoma and Annapolis, is a major source of sediment in the river and its tributaries. High water temperatures is another significant problem. Logging has removed large streamside trees that provided shade and reduced the amount of large woody debris, which creates pools.

== San Diego 2002 water bag proposal ==
In 2002, Alaska businessmen and former Reagan administration Interior Department official Ric Davidge announced plans to collect water from the Albion and Gualala rivers in large bags and tow it several hundred miles south to San Diego as drinking water. However, the plan drew local opposition, and was eventually shelved after the state government passed new laws requiring extensive studies of the effects on fish habitats before any such plan could proceed. The governor later signed a law declaring the two rivers as recreational areas, preventing similar attempts at exploiting their resources.

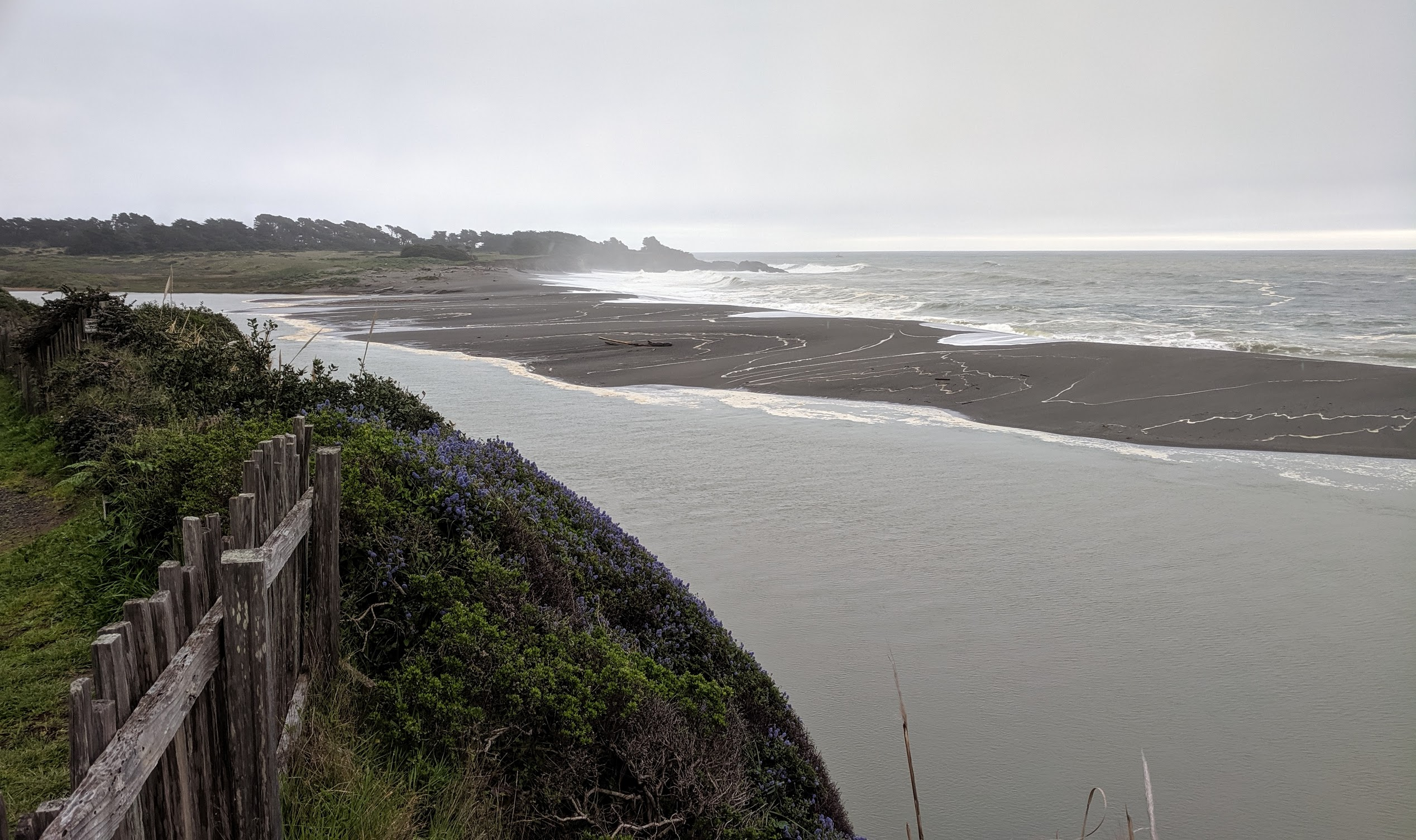
Pacific Ocean with Gualala River mouth and sandbar

== See also ==
- Gualala Point Regional Park
- Gualala River Railroad
- List of rivers in California
- List of watercourses in the San Francisco Bay Area
