= Baltimore City Passenger Railway =

The Baltimore City Passenger Railway began operation on July 12, 1859 using horse-drawn cars.

Oden Bowie was elected president of the railroad in 1873.

The company operated a cable car system between 1893 and March 22, 1899.

== Remaining structures ==
- Baltimore City Passenger Railway Power House and Car Barn, 1711-1719 North Charles Street, Baltimore, Maryland 21201, built in 1892
- Baltimore City Passenger Railway cable powerhouse, 1100 East Baltimore Street, Baltimore, Maryland 21202, built in 1892

== See also ==
- Baltimore Streetcar Museum
- History of MTA Maryland
- United Railways and Electric Company
