= Baltimore City Passenger Railway Power House and Car Barn =

Historic building in Maryland, USA

- U.S. National Register of Historic Places
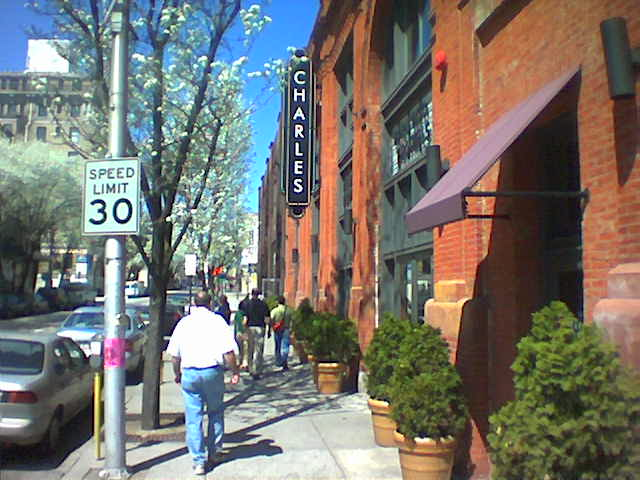
- The Charles Theatre

- Location within Baltimore Location within Maryland Location within the United States
- Location: 1711-1717 N. Charles St., Baltimore, Maryland
- Coordinates: 39°18′33″N 76°36′59″W
- Area: less than one acre
- Built: 1892
- Architectural style: Romanesque
- NRHP reference No.: 98001156
- Added to NRHP: September 9, 1998

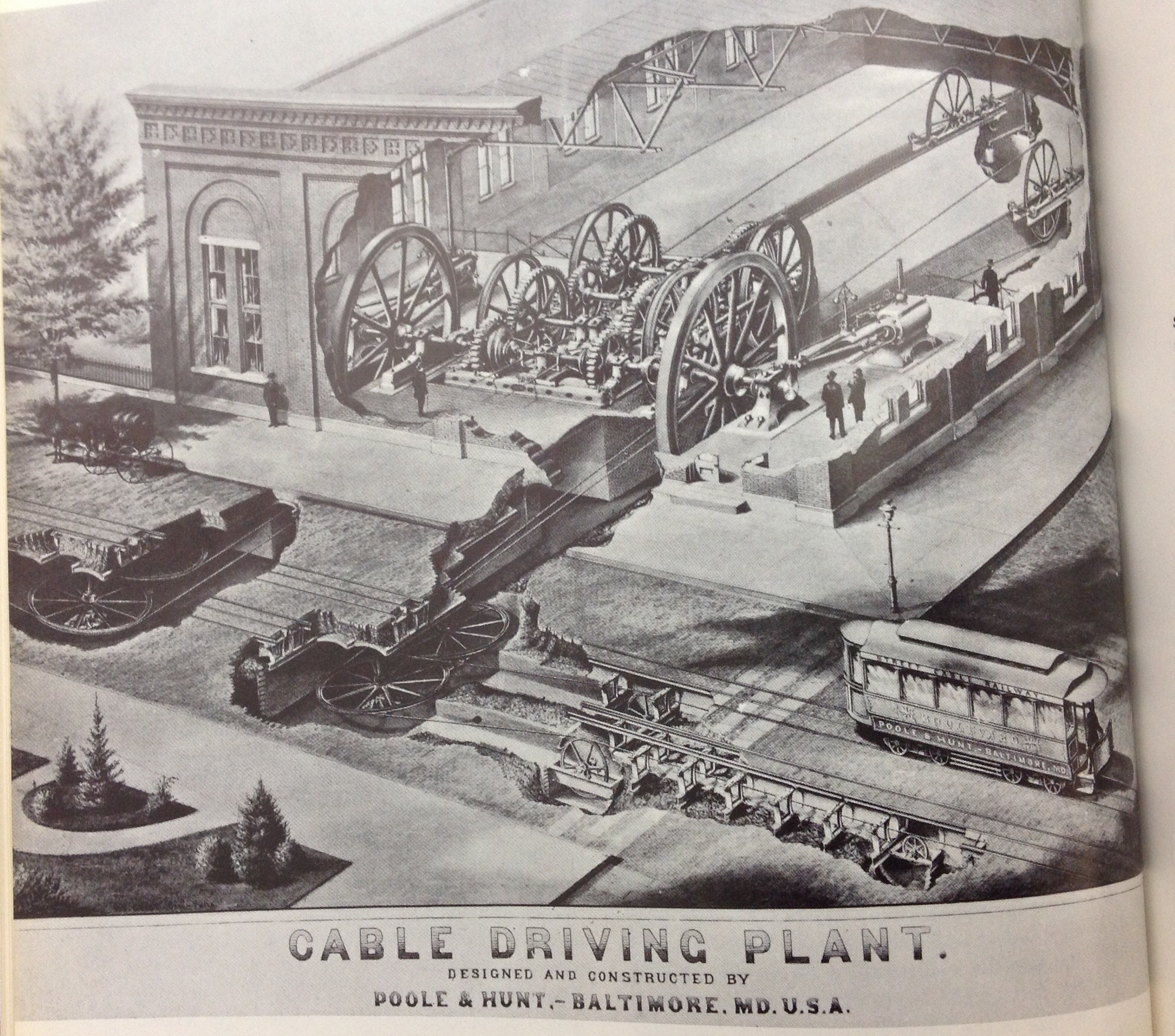
Cable Driving Plant, Designed and Constructed by Poole & Hunt, Baltimore, MD. Drawing by P.F. Goist, circa 1882. The powerhouse has two horizontal single-cylinder engines. The lithograph shows a hypothetical prototype of a cable powerhouse, rather than any actual built structure. Poole & Hunt, machinists and engineers, was a major cable industry designer and contractor and manufacturer of gearing, sheaves, shafting and wire rope drums. They did work for cable railways in Baltimore, Chicago, Hoboken, Kansas City, New York, and Philadelphia.

Baltimore City Passenger Railway Power House and Car Barn, also known as the Charles Theatre, is a historic street railway building located at Baltimore, Maryland, United States. It is a two-story brick Romanesque Revival style building, constructed in 1892, that has been altered for a variety of uses over the years. The southern half of the building (now the Charles Theater) was used for the power house; the northern half (formerly the Famous Ballroom and a bowling alley) was used for the car barn. It was constructed by Baltimore's oldest streetcar company to provide cable traction on one of its first and most important lines. The car barn was the node where the Baltimore & Northern Railway transferred its streetcars to City Passenger tracks. In 1939 the United Railways and Electric Company sold the structure and it was then converted into a theater, bowling alley, and ballroom.

Baltimore City Passenger Railway Power House and Car Barn was listed on the National Register of Historic Places in 1998.

== See also ==
- Baltimore City Passenger Railway
