= Royal Theatre (Baltimore) =

Former theater, movie theater and music venue in Baltimore, Maryland, US

Coordinates: 39°18′4″N 76°37′53″W

The Royal Theatre, located at 1329 Pennsylvania Avenue in Baltimore, Maryland, first opened in 1922 as the Black-owned Douglass Theatre. It was the most famous theatre along West Baltimore's Pennsylvania Avenue, one of a circuit of five such theaters for Black entertainment in big cities. Its sister theaters were the Apollo in Harlem, the Howard Theatre in Washington, D.C., the Regal Theatre in Chicago, and the Earle Theatre in Philadelphia.

All of the biggest stars in Black entertainment, including those in jazz and blues such as Cab Calloway, performed at the Royal. Ethel Waters debuted there, as did Pearl Bailey, who sang in a chorus line. Louis Armstrong and Fats Waller worked as accompanists. Singer Louis Jordan, Duke Ellington, The Tympany Five, Etta James, Nat King Cole, The Platters, The Temptations, and The Supremes, as well as a 40-piece, all-female band touring with Count Basie called the Sweethearts of Rhythm, were all performers at the Royal.

Baltimore's first talking motion picture was shown there in 1929 when Scar of Shame, was shown, featuring a Black cast. It was here that Solomon Burke was crowned the King of Rock 'n Soul in November 1963.

As middle-class, white flight from Old West Baltimore continued during the 1960s and 1970s and accelerated after Pennsylvania Avenue was damaged during the civil rights riots, the entire community began a period of long decline. At the time of the riots, the Royal Theatre was owned by the JF Theatres chain. In 1971, the Royal Theater was demolished as part of an "urban renewal" effort.

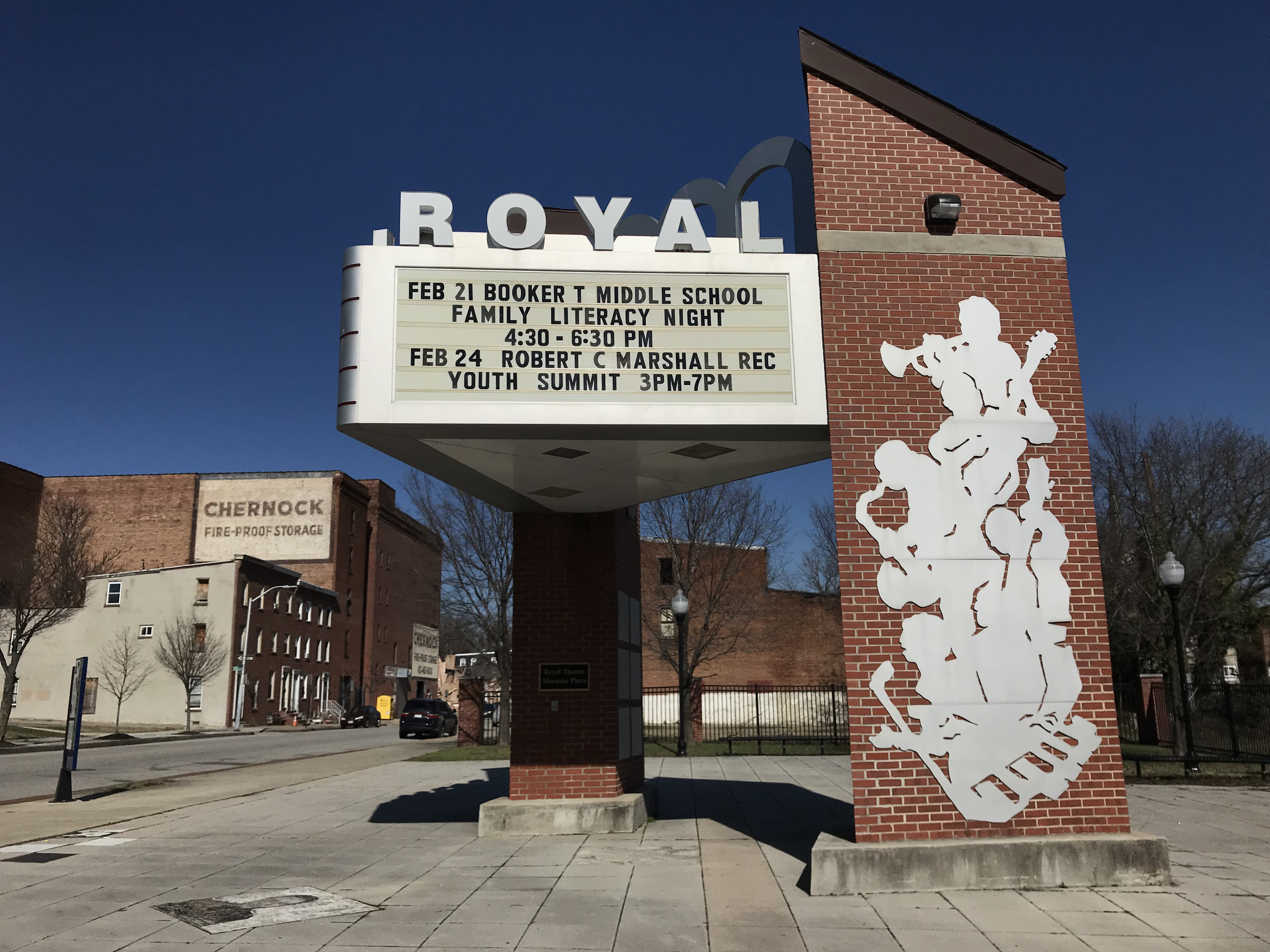
Royal Theatre Marquee in 2018

The Royal Theater Marquee Monument was to be phase one of an ongoing series of projects that the Pennsylvania Avenue Redevelopment Collaborative (PARC) would lead. PARC and the Pennsylvania Avenue Committee worked closely with the Mayor's Office, the Upton Planning Committee, and 14 community groups over seven years to erect the Royal Theater Monument in 2004. However, widespread urban blight still remains; the entire Pennsylvania Avenue corridor has long since been razed, and nothing survives there today insofar as theaters. In the vacant lot where the Royal Theatre once stood, there is a sign declaring the Royal Theatre Memorial Park, but the park is small, fenced-in, and has seen few developments. West Baltimore–native James Hamlin founded the Royal Theatre and Community Heritage Corporation in 2005 with the goal to rebuild the Royal Theatre and revitalize Pennsylvania Avenue as an entertainment district.
