= John Mifflin Hood =

Civil engineer, railroad executive (1843–1906)

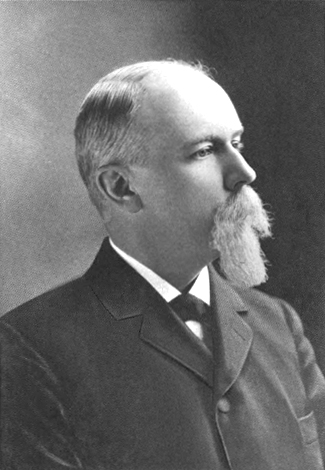
- Born: April 5, 1843; Bowling Green, Howard County, Maryland (near Sykesville)
- Died: December 17, 1906 (aged 63); Baltimore, Maryland
- Burial place: Druid Ridge Cemetery
- Occupations: Railroad construction engineer and later executive
- Years active: 1865-1874, 1874-1906
- Known for: Western Maryland Railway (WMRR), United Railways and Electric Company (UREC) (electric streetcars system in Baltimore metro area)
- Spouse: Florence Eloise Haden

Signature
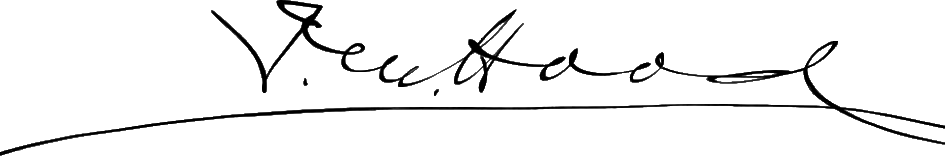

John Mifflin Hood (1843–1906) was an American railroad and electric streetcar system executive.

Hood was President of the Western Maryland Railway from 1874 to 1901. In 1901-1902, he became President of United Railways and Electric Company, a streetcar system company in the Baltimore metropolitan area. As the head of the UREC system at the turn of the 20th century, he oversaw completion of the massive construction project of the Pratt Street Power Plant.

== Life and early educational/travel career ==
Hood was born near the village of Bowling Green in Howard County, Maryland, (which had just been erected/set up five years before by cutting portions of northwestern Anne Arundel County off, formerly known as the Western District, then later as the Howard District), which is now near Sykesville, on April 5, 1843. He was the son of Dr. Benjamin Hood of the district and Miss Hannah Mifflin Hood of Baltimore. He studied at Rugby's Institute of Mount Washington, north of the city, from which he graduated in 1859. From 1859 to 1861 he traveled to the continent of South America and to Brazil exploring the technical opportunities and challenges there. He studied civil engineering and was intrigued by the Sciences and mathematics. His career was briefly interrupted by his service in the American Civil War when he returned from the Southern Hemisphere.

== American Civil War career (1861-1865) ==
When he arrived back home in North America after a two-year absence, the country was embroiled in civil strife and secession with a split home border state of Maryland. He enlisted in August 1861 in Company C of the Second Maryland Regiment, then serving in exile in the southern Army of Northern Virginia of the newly organized Confederate States Army. Later on, Hood was noted for his topographical engineering abilities and transferred to Company B of the Second Maryland with engineering duties greatly needed in the Southern army's limited industrial railroad experience. He was wounded seven times and suffered shattering injuries to his left arm which necessitated a lengthy healing process.

== Post-war railroading engineering/construction career (1865-1874) ==
After the war, Hood worked as an engineer on construction projects for several railroads in the mid-Atlantic states region, beginning on the Philadelphia, Wilmington and Baltimore Railroad (P.W.& B.), the Delaware Railroad, followed by the Eastern Shore Railroad on the Delmarva peninsula and later including the Philadelphia and Baltimore Central Railroad, where he was appointed Superintendent and Chief Engineer.

== Western Maryland Railway (1874-1901) ==
Hood joined the Western Maryland Railway as Vice President and General Manager in March 1874, and later that year he became President of the company at the age of 31. During his career at the WM he led the company in its transformation from a local carrier to a major regional railroad. The year after he assumed leadership, the railway built and opened its headquarters offices and main eastern terminal in 1875 at the "Hillen Station" on the north side of the 900 block of Hillen Street near Front Street and High Street, near the east bank of the Jones Falls stream.

An important new connection was made with the first passenger rail line in America since beginning 1827 and now a major railroad line in the Northeast United States of the Baltimore and Ohio Railroad, which was also headquartered in its home of "The Monumental City". As befits its name, it was a most important transportation service for the western part of the "Old Line State" and surrounding areas in the Appalachian, Blue Ridge and Allegheny Mountains range. He oversaw a major improvement in the railway's financial condition. During his quarter-century long tenure, the W.M. Company's annual gross earnings increased from about $218,000 in 1874 to $2.1 million in 1902.

== United Railways and Electric Company (1901-1906) ==
Hood joined the United Railways and Electric Company (U.R.E.C.), the newly merged electric streetcar system for the metropolitan area in Baltimore, in 1901. At that time the company's infrastructure was significantly deteriorated from the combining of various smaller lines which had begun in the 1850s and only in the last decade had converted from horsecars pulling power to electric. Hood oversaw the beginnings of extensive renovations as well as expansions of the system. He managed a rebuilding of the system and its newly constructed Pratt Street Power Plant located on the south edge waterfront of the downtown area after the Great Baltimore Fire of February 1904. The fire had destroyed over 1,500 buildings and devastated most of central downtown Baltimore. He worked extensively to reconstruct the damaged rail lines and power generating houses of the "Burnt District" in the center city and got the coal-fired boilers of the Power Plant on Pier 4 back online.

John Mifflin Hood died at his home in Baltimore on December 17, 1906, and was buried at Druid Ridge Cemetery.

A bronze statue of Hood on a stone pedestal was erected around 1911 by his friends in the old Hopkins Place. After 1963 it was relocated to the terraced "Preston Gardens".

== See also ==
- List of railroad executives
