= Breitspurbahn =

Super-broad-gauge railway planned by Germany

The Breitspurbahn (German pronunciation: [ˈbʁaɪtʃpuːɐ̯baːn], transl. broad-gauge railway) was a railway system planned and partly surveyed by Nazi Germany. Its track gauge – the distance between the two running rails – was to be 3000 mm (9 ft 10 1/8 in), more than twice that of the 1435 mm (4 ft 8 1/2 in) standard gauge used in western Europe. The railway was intended initially to run between major cities of the Greater Germanic Reich (the regime's expanded Germany) and neighbouring states.

== History ==
Since reparations due after World War I had to be paid, the German railway company Deutsche Reichsbahn lacked money for appropriate expansion and sufficient maintenance of their track network and rolling stock.

Commercial and civilian traffic increased due to economic stimulation after the rise of the NSDAP and Hitler's seizure of power. Deutsche Reichsbahn was now faced with a serious capacity problem. As a result, in part driven by its military objectives, the government prepared plans to modernize the railway network and increase transport capacity. Hitler believed that the standard Stephenson gauge was obsolete and was too narrow for the full development of railways. Also, as Hitler envisioned the future German empire as essentially a land-based Empire, the new German railways were imagined as a land-based equivalent of the ocean liners and freighters connecting the maritime British Empire.

Hitler embraced a suggestion from Fritz Todt to build a new high-capacity Reichsspurbahn (imperial gauge railway) with notably increased gauge. Objections from railway experts – who foresaw difficulties in introducing a new, incompatible gauge (and proposed quadruple track standard gauge lines instead), and who could not imagine any use for the vast transport capacity of such a railway – were ignored, and Hitler ordered the Breitspurbahn to be built with initial lines between Hamburg, Berlin, Nuremberg, Munich and Linz.

The project engaged commercial partners Krauss-Maffei; Henschel; Borsig; Brown, Boveri & Cie and Krupp, but did not develop beyond line planning and initial survey. Throughout World War II, 100 officials and 80 engineers continued to work on the project, under the management of Ministerial Counsellor Günther Wiens.

== Proposed routes ==
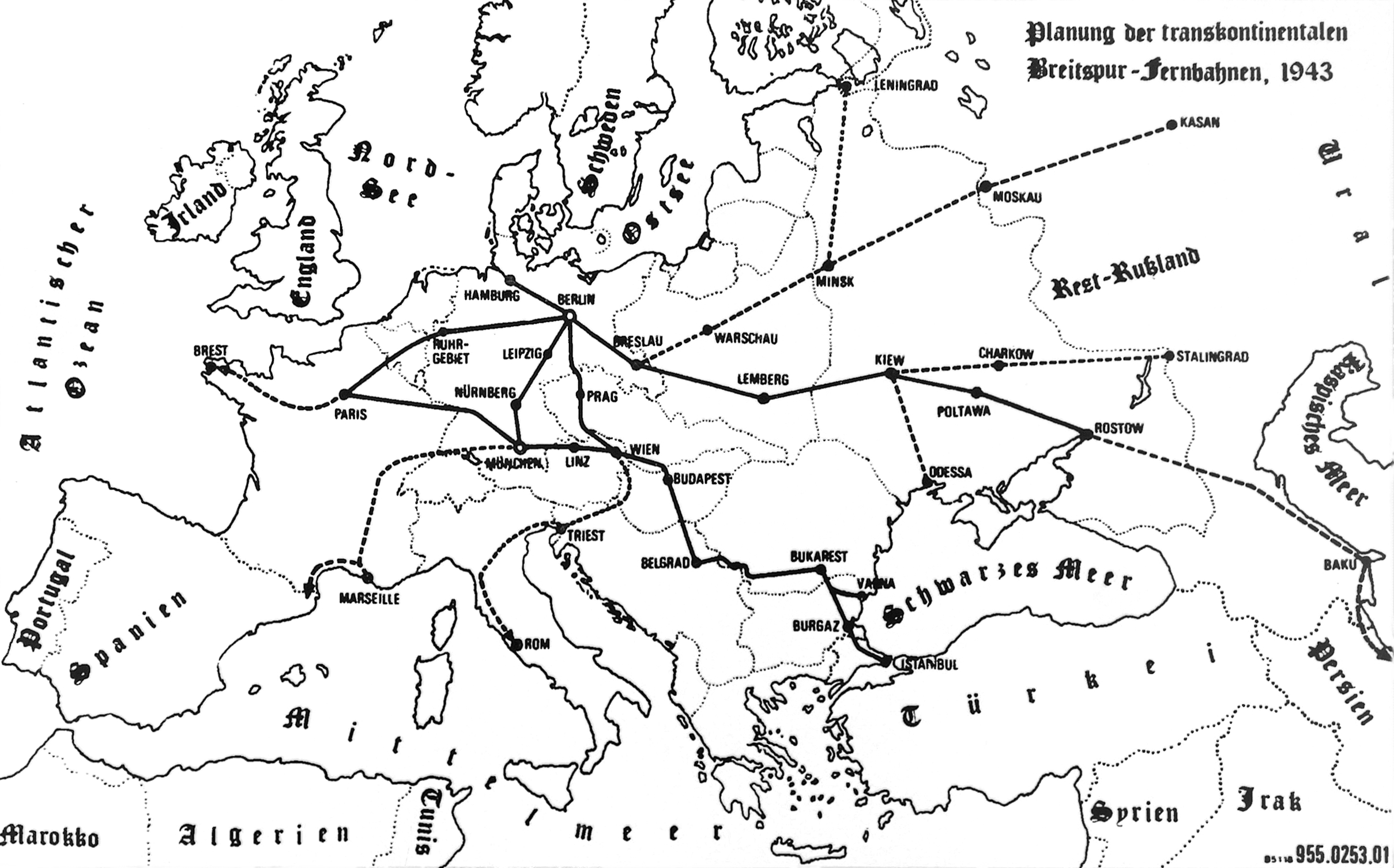
Proposed route map 1943 (postwar drawing with borders of 1937)

Early plans for routes considered India, Iran, Syria, Vladivostok and Canada (via Bering Strait) as the ultimate goals of the railways, but by 1943 the planning was focused exclusively on European cities. Ukraine and the Volga Basin were seen as especially important targets, as these areas were viewed as the future granaries of Greater Germany, potentially through the "settlement strings", or Siedlungsperlen of the proposed Wehrbauer settlements within the conquered territories, which would also be linked by the planned easternmost reaches of the Reichsautobahn freeway network. Due to mountainous terrain, the initial phase routes of Aachen-Paris and Budapest-Bucharest were drawn via Antwerp instead of Liège, and via Belgrade instead of the Hungary/Romania border respectively.

- East-West: Rostov - Donetsk - Poltava - Kyiv - Lviv - Krakau - Kattowitz - Breslau - Cottbus - Welthauptstadt Germania (Berlin) - Hannover - Bielefeld - Ruhrgebiet - Aachen - Liège - Saint-Quentin - Paris
  - Initially proposed the Flemish corridor as Aachen - Antwerp - Ghent - Paris
- North-Southeast: Hamburg - Wittenberge - Welthauptstadt Germania (Berlin) - Leipzig - Gotha - Bamberg - Nuernberg - Munich - Simbach am Inn - Linz - Vienna - Preßburg - Budapest - Bucharest - Varna/Burgas - Istanbul
  - Initially proposed the Serbian corridor as Budapest - Belgrade - Bucharest
- North-South-Parallel: Welthauptstadt Germania (Berlin) - Dresden - Aussig - Prague - Iglau - Znaim - Vienna - Trieste - Rome
- East-West 2: Munich - Augsburg - Stuttgart - Karlsruhe - Metz - Reims - Paris - Marseille - Barcelona - Madrid

For further routes, see German version and Dutch version.

== Tracks ==
Comparison with Standard and Russian gauge

Originally proposed to run on a 4,000 mm (13 ft 1 1/2 in) track, the Breitspurbahn was ultimately developed with a track gauge of 3,000 mm (9 ft 10 1/8 in), more than double the width of the common standard gauge track, and three times the width of the common semi-narrow metre gauge track. Planning called for a ballastless track (much as was developed 30 years later for San Francisco BART and 40 years later for German high-speed lines) which consisted of two parallel pre-stressed concrete "walls" sunk into the ground, joined at the top by a flat transverse slab. The rails were fixed on top of the "walls", with an elastic material between rail and concrete. Because it did not have conventional railway sleepers, this track would also have formed an ideal road for maintenance and military purposes. The rails would be either 155 pounds per yard (77 kg/m), as on the Pennsylvania Railroad; 8-inch (200 mm) tall) rails or proposed 190 lb/yd (94 kg/m) (height-width ratio of 1:1) rails. The passing loop length would be more than a mile (1 1/2 km).

== Vehicles ==
=== Locomotives ===
Forty-one different locomotive designs were suggested by the industry partners. These ranged from classical steam locomotives through steam turbine, gas turbine-electric and diesel-hydraulic to electric locomotives. The designs ranged from 12 axles (UIC: 3′Fo3′, Whyte: 6-12-6) to 52 axles (UIC: 2′Fo′Fo′2′ + 5T5 + 5T5 + 2′Fo′Fo′2′, Whyte: 4-12-12-4 + 10-10 + 10-10 + 4-12-12-4). Power ranged from 11,400 to 18,400 kW (15,300 to 24,700 hp). All locomotives would have automatic couplers, ranged from Janney couplers to SA3 couplers. Several designs were short listed with passenger locomotives to be mainly electric and diesel-hydraulic with SA3 couplers, and freight locomotives to be mainly conventional steam with Janney couplers.

=== Multiple units ===
Diesel and electric multiple units of between five and eight coaches were proposed for shorter distance journeys. Despite being of somewhat lower standard, proposed designs included promenades, bars, lounges and large dining rooms.

=== Carriages ===
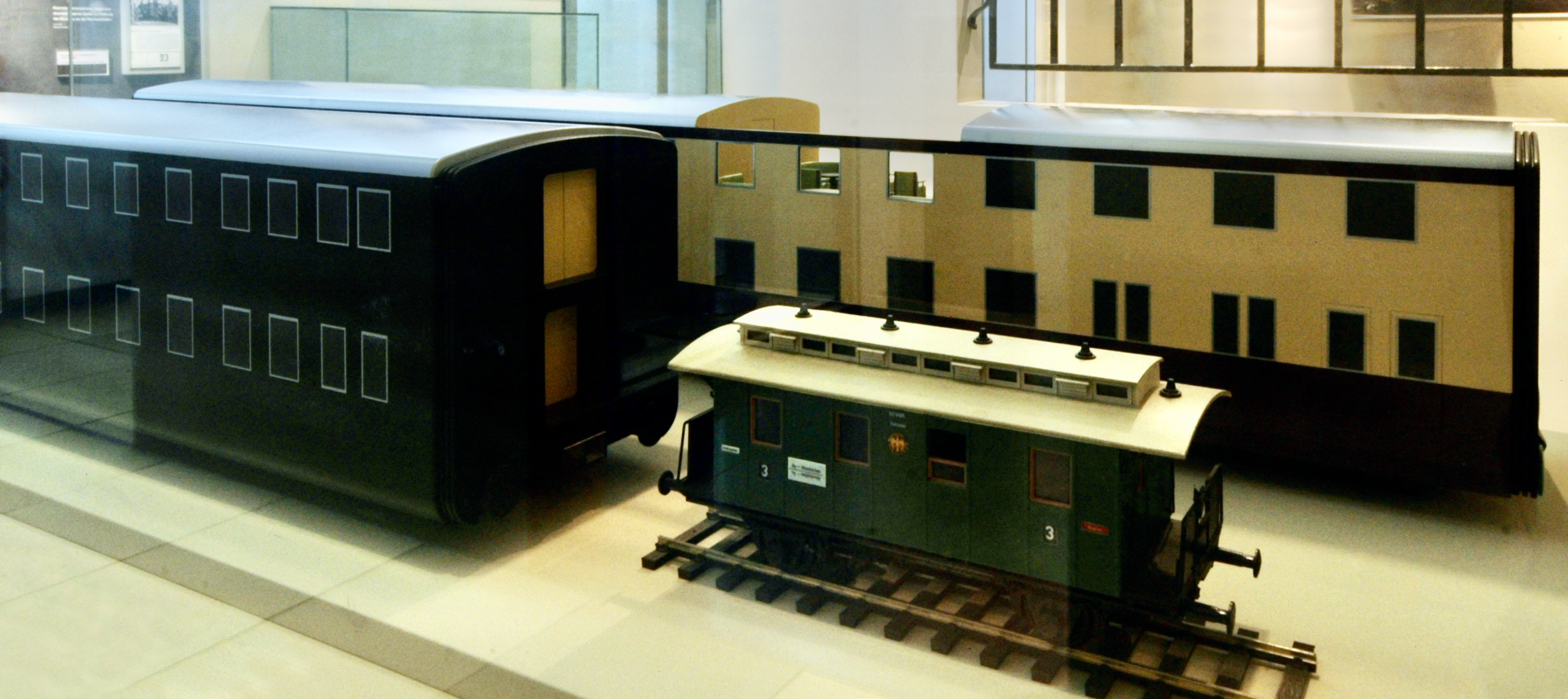
Models of two proposed Breitspurbahn passenger carriages next to a 19th century standard-gauge carriage at the DB Museum

The proposal was that high-performance locomotives should pull 8-axle bi-level carriages with a length of 42 metres (138 ft), width of 6 metres (19 ft 8 in) and height of 7 metres (23 ft 0 in). The carriages would have Dutch doors (with retractable staircase). The trains would be fitted with a restaurant, theatre, swimming pool, barbershop and sauna. The whole train would have a length of about 500 metres (1640 ft), allowing a capacity of between 2000 and 4000 passengers, travelling at speeds of 200 kilometres per hour (120 mph). Designs included:

- 1st/2nd class day car: 48 first class seats in 12 compartments, 144 second class seats in 24 compartments, bar, lounge, reading room, luggage compartments, 12 toilets.
- 3rd class day car: 460 seats in 56 compartments, lounge, 12 toilets.
- 1st/2nd class dining car: 130 seats at 24 tables, kitchen, pantry.
- 3rd class day car with dining room: 244 seats in 28 compartments, 176 seat dining room, kitchen, pantry.
- 1st/2nd class sleeping car: 16 first class beds in 16 cabins, 41 second class beds in 19 cabins, breakfast room, kitchen, washrooms, 10 toilets.
- 2nd class sleeping car: 104 beds in 104 cabins, washrooms, 12 toilets.
- 3rd class sleeping car: 264 beds in 44 cabins, breakfast room, kitchen, shower rooms, 10 toilets.
- Day/night car for Ost-Arbeiter: 480 seats in 52 cabins, kitchen, washrooms, staff room.
- Theatre car: 196-seat theatre.
- Observation car: 16 first class seats in four compartments, 32 second class seats in eight compartments, 160 third class seats in 20 compartments, galley, cold buffet, bar, observation deck.
- Mail car: mail storage and sorting, parcel space, crew room, space for 6 automobiles, dog kennels.
- Baggage car: baggage rooms, space for two automobiles, dog kennels, canteen, crew room, multiple 20 mm anti-aircraft guns, ammunition storage and gun crews.

== Successors and similar plans ==
After Nazi Germany collapsed, several super-broad-gauge railways were proposed, with track gauges ranging from 9 to 18 feet (2750 to 5500 mm). Locomotive options added nuclear-powered locomotives, and passenger carriages lengths ranging from 40 to 80 metres (130 to 260 ft). Most passenger carriages would have Dutch doors and a retractable boarding staircase, with some exceptions for low-level boarding only.

== In fiction ==
A ride on a Breitspurbahn-like train is featured in the video game Wolfenstein: The New Order. The railway network is also mentioned in novels Fatherland and The Fuhrer's Orphans.

== See also ==
- Welthauptstadt Germania
- Eurasian Land Bridge
- Bering Strait crossing
- Broad gauge
- Dual gauge
- Great Western Railway (Isambard Kingdom Brunel)
- Train on Train
- Trans-Asian Railway
- Transcontinental railroad
