= JF Theatres =

Movie theatre chain in Maryland, 1950s–1980s

- Type: Private
- Industry: Entertainment
- Founder: Jack Fruchtman Sr.
- Area served: Baltimore-Washington metropolitan area
- Services: Movie theaters
- Owner: Jack Fruchtman Sr.

JR Theatres was a chain of cinemas in the Baltimore metropolitan region. Now defunct, it was one of the largest movie theatre chains in Maryland between the 1950s and the 1980s. At its height, JF Theatres owned over 50 movie theatres, including all of the major cinemas in Baltimore, including the Royal Theatre and what is now the Charles Theatre.

== History ==
JF Theatres was founded and owned by Jack Fruchtman Sr., an office manager and chief accountant at the Washington, D.C. office of Paramount Pictures. Fruchtman was born on Manhattan's Lower East Side, the son of Polish-Jewish immigrants. Fruchtman's wife Goluem K. Bragg and their son Jack Fruchtman Jr. were also involved in the family business. Publicity for JF Theatres was managed by Herbert A. Schwartz. In 1956, Paramount chairman of the board Adolph Zukor selected Fruchtman's New Theater in Baltimore as one of the first cinemas to screen Cecil B. DeMille's The Ten Commandments. Following white flight to the suburbs in the 1960s, movie attendance fell at JF Theatres. An avowed liberal, Fruchtman began to cater to Black audiences. During the 1960s and 1970s, Fruchtman helped make Baltimore a major market for blaxploitation films.

In 1951, the Catholic Action Group of St. Hugh's Catholic Church in Greenbelt protested the showing of the Italian film Bitter Rice at Fruchtman's Greenbelt Theater in Greenbelt, Maryland. Fruchtman responded that he did not seek to offend anyone, but would not censor the film over the protests of "only a few people". Peter McGonagle of the Catholic Action Group, the Lutheran reverend Edwin Pieplow, and the Methodist reverend Charles Strausburg condemned the film as "filthy", "immoral", and salaciously advertised. The Catholic National Legion of Decency had given the film a "C" rating. Greenbelt Theater's general manager Sam Ashelman temporarily cancelled a showing, but later rescheduled. Fruchtman had initially conceded to the conservative Christian advocates, but retracted following larger community protests against "local censorship". The film played for 9 weeks in DC's Dupont Theater without protest.

The Royal Theatre in Baltimore, then owned by JF Theatres, was damaged during the Baltimore riot of 1968. Physical damage to facilities owned by JF Theatres was generally minimal. However, according to the film historian Robert Headley, the "psychic damage to the theater going public was terrible" and a wave of cinemas closed in the following decade.

== Former JF Theatres facilities ==
- AMC Lexington Park 6, Lexington Park, Maryland
- Charles Theatre, Baltimore
- NextAct Cinema at the Pikes, Pikesville, Maryland

=== Demolished structures ===
- Avalon Theatre, Baltimore
- Columbia Palace 9, Columbia, Maryland
- Loews Northpoint Plaza 4, Baltimore
- Mayfair Theatre, Baltimore
- Royal Theatre, Baltimore
- Sun Valley 6 of Pasadena, Maryland
- Tower Theatre, Baltimore

== See also ==
- Jews in American cinema
