= Charles Theatre =

Movie theater in Baltimore, Maryland, US

Coordinates: 39°18′33″N 76°36′58.5″W

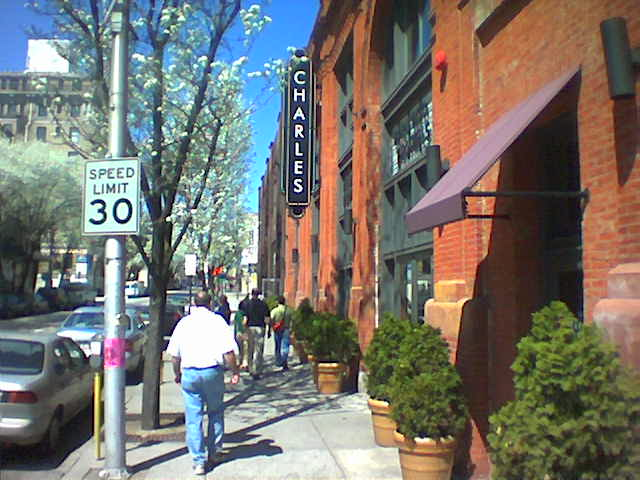
The Charles Theatre

The Charles Theatre, often referred to as simply The Charles, is the oldest movie theatre in Baltimore. The theatre is a Beaux-Arts building designed as a streetcar barn in 1892 by Jackson C. Gott, located in what is now the Station North arts and entertainment district. The theater opened as the Times Theatre in 1939, and was renamed the Charles (for its location on Charles Street) circa 1959 and became a calendar revival house in 1979.

In 1999, it underwent a major expansion and is now a five-screen theater, though the original main theater has been left largely intact and is still the largest theater in the complex. The Charles now serves as an arthouse multiplex, showing a variety of independent films along with some major studio prestige pictures. The main theatre hosts revival series and special screenings several times a week, as well as the occasional live concert performance. The entire theater complex served as the host of the annual Maryland Film Festival from 1999 until 2013.

The Charles sits just across the tracks of the Northeast Corridor from Penn Station, putting the theater within easy walking distance of Amtrak, MARC, and Light Rail service. Another Light Rail stop, University of Baltimore/Mt. Royal, is also close by.

The original structure, known as the Baltimore City Passenger Railway Power House and Car Barn, was listed on the National Register of Historic Places in 1998.

== Trivia ==
The pre-expansion Charles of the 1970s was featured in the John Waters film Polyester as the X-rated theater run by Elmer Fishpaw, the husband of Divine's character, Francine Fishpaw. The film held its premiere at the Charles in 1981; previous Waters films premiered at the University of Baltimore, and subsequent premieres were held at the Senator Theatre.

The first public screenings of the expanded 5-screen Charles took place within the inaugural year of Maryland Film Festival in April, 1999.

The expanded Charles includes the former location of the Famous Ballroom, where the Left Bank Jazz Society held events in the 1960s and 1970s. That incarnation of the space can be seen in portions of the documentary Sun Ra: A Joyful Noise.

== See also ==
- JF Theatres
