= Brownell Car Company =

- Industry: Horsecars
- Predecessor: Brownell and Wight Car Company
- Founded: 1875; 150 years ago
- Founder: Frederick Brownell and Andrew Wight
- Headquarters: St. Louis, Missouri, United States
- Parent: American Car Company or J. G. Brill and Company

Brownell Car Company was a horsecar and streetcar builder in St. Louis, Missouri.

The company was founded as Brownell and Wight Car Company by Frederick Brownell and Andrew Wight in 1875 as a horsecar builder, and was renamed in 1879.

It produced electric cars after horsecar service was abandoned by many cities. The company was bought by J. G. Brill and Company in 1902, either directly or through their American Car Company subsidiary.

== Product ==
- Horsecars
- SE ST streetcar
- Cable cars - Chicago, Brooklyn, New York, Kansas City
- Low's Adjustable Car
- Accelerator Car
- Open bench electric street cars
- Combination cars
- Rail grinder cars

== Clients ==
- Montreal Street Railway
- Baltimore Traction Company - open bench streetcars
- Grand Avenue Railway - Kansas City - cable cars
- Chicago City Railway - Chicago - cable cars
- Brooklyn Avenue Railway - cable cars
- Salem, Oregon Salem Street Railway Company - horsecars
- St. Louis Public Service Company
- Baltimore Consolidated Railway Co. - Accelerator Cars
- United Railways & Electric Co. - Convertible Cars (Originally ordered by BCRC, order specifications altered by UR&E)

== See also ==
- St. Louis Car Company, the railcar maker founded in 1887 in St. Louis
