= Poole and Hunt Company Buildings =

Historic district in Maryland, United States

- U.S. National Register of Historic Places
- U.S. Historic district
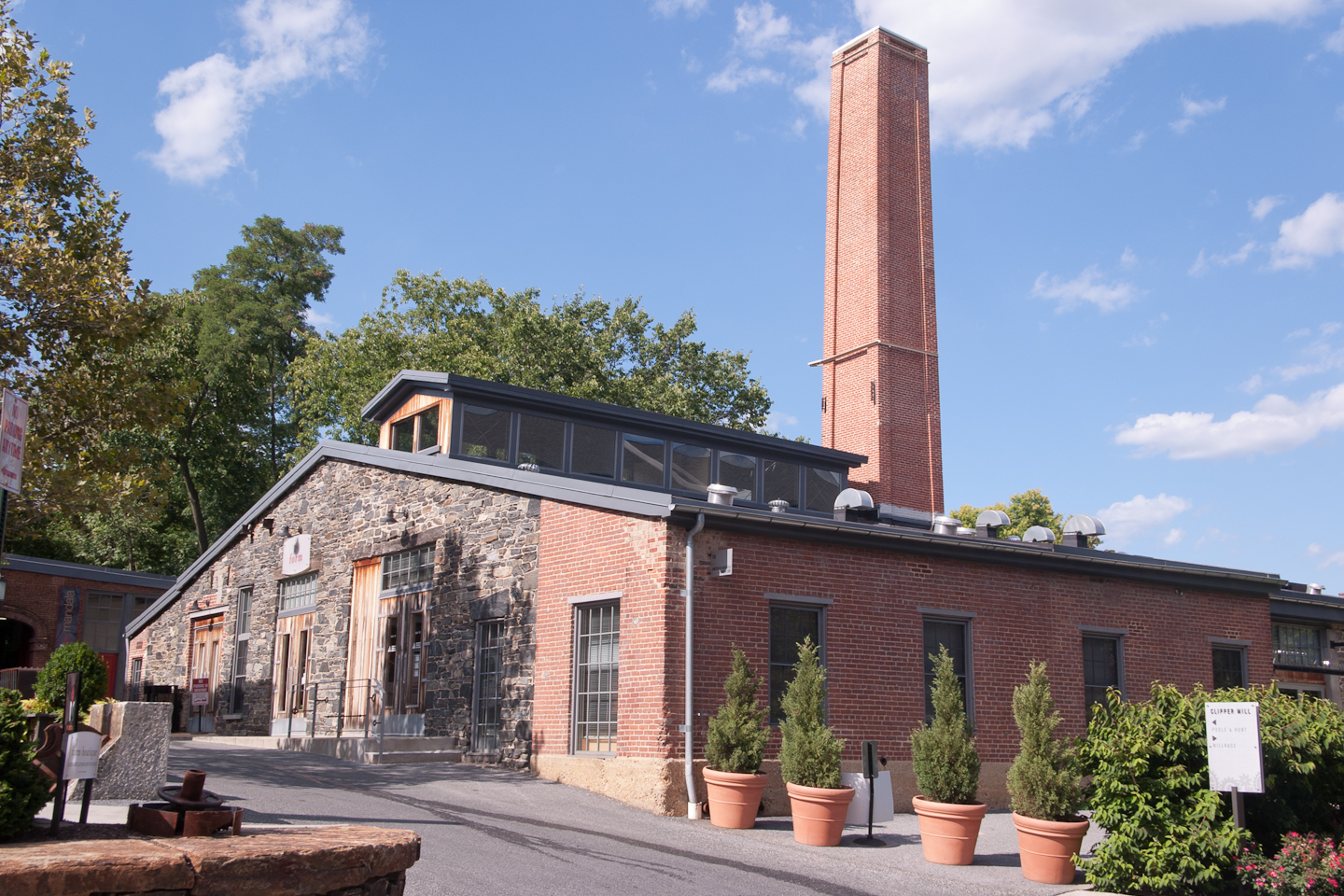
- Poole and Hunt Company Buildings, August 2011

- Location within Baltimore Location within Maryland Location within the United States
- Location: 3500 Clipper Rd., Baltimore, Maryland
- Coordinates: 39°19′53″N 76°38′45″W
- Area: 8.5 acres (3.4 ha)
- Built: 1853
- NRHP reference No.: 73002194
- Added to NRHP: July 2, 1973

Poole and Hunt Company Buildings refers to a complex of buildings that once housed an ironworks— consisting of a foundry, machine shop, blacksmith shop, erecting shop, and other structures, which were located in the Woodberry section of northwest Baltimore, Maryland, United States. The buildings, made chiefly of brick and fieldstone, occupied portions of a 20-acre (81,000 m^{2} ) site. They were constructed beginning in 1853 and enlarged periodically as the business of manufacturing iron-based parts and machinery expanded. [Poole and Hunt refers to the partners Robert Poole (1818-1903) and German H. Hunt (1828-1907).] In 1973, although the buildings had been converted to other uses, they remained intact and that year were added to the National Register of Historic Places. In 1995, a major fire destroyed the machine shop, damaged parts of other buildings, and stopped further activity in the balance of the site. After 2000, real estate developers purchased the former industrial site and converted the buildings into commercial and residential uses. The complex is now known as Clipper Mill.

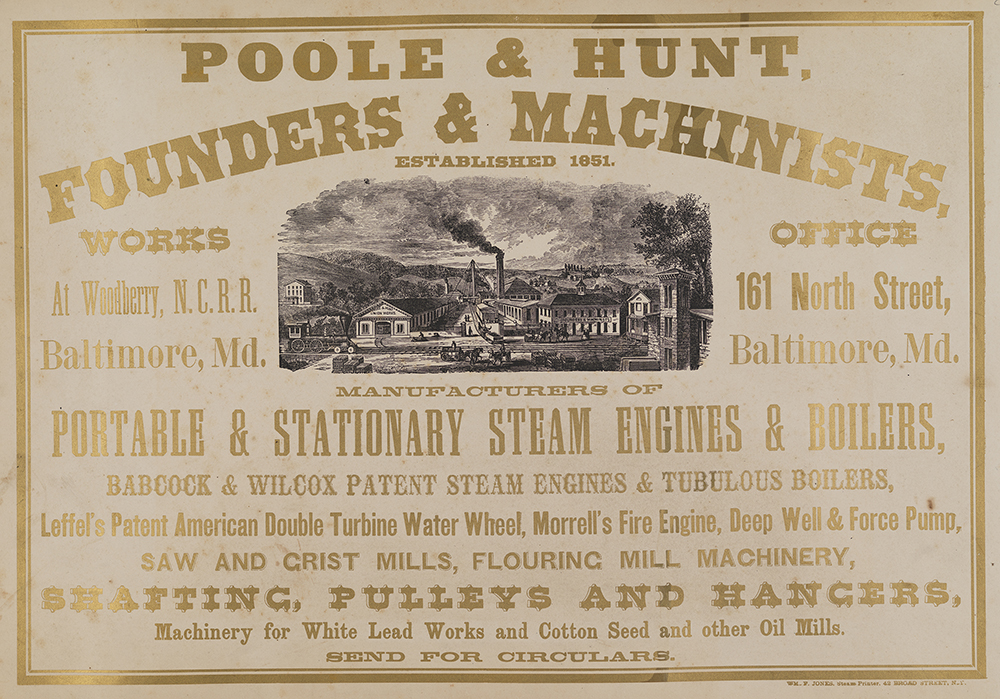
An 1869 advertisement for Poole and Hunt
