= Gualala River Railroad =

Broad gauge lumber railway in California

Locomotive number 1, W.B. Heywood, traversing the Mendocino forests

The Gualala River Railroad was a logging railroad in Mendocino County, California. At its peak, it operated 22 miles (35 km) of track built to a unique broad gauge of 5 feet 8 1/2 inches (1,740 mm). (Note: Many sources give the railroad's gauge as 5 feet 8 inches (1,727 mm))

As an arm of the mill and lacking passenger service, the railroad was owned by several companies over its lifetime. These included the Gualala Mill Company, the Empire Redwood Company, E.B. Salsig Lumber Company, American Redwood Company, and National Redwood Company.

== History ==
The initial segment of railway was built as a horse-drawn tramway to haul lumber from the Gualala Mill Company to Bourn's Landing — it began running shortly after the mill's opening in 1860. Motive power was converted to steam operations in 1875, with the railroad extending to 10 miles (16 km) of track by 1891. The railroad did not operate between 1907 and 1911 after the lumber mill was destroyed in a fire; it also did not operate between 1915 and 1916. The railroad ceased operating for good in 1922. Rails were taken up and shipped to Japan for reuse in 1936.

== Broad gauge ==
Gualala Railroad with broad gauge track and locomotive number 2, S.H. Harmon

The unusual gauge was selected to allow horses to be teamed two-abreast between the rails. The tramway was initially laid to standard gauge, and the company's two horses would fight to take the center of the track. When the driver complained to management, they had the rails relaid to five feet. This was still found insufficient to mitigate the issue, and the gauge was finally enlarged to 5 feet 8 1/2 inches (1,740 mm), which persisted through the life of the railroad. It was the widest gauge deployed on a railroad in the western United States.

== Locomotives ==
No.	Name	Type	Builder	C/N	Built	Notes
1	W.B. Heywood	0-4-0	Miners Foundry and Locomotive Works		1875	This was one of three locomotives ever built by the company. Wood-burning and built with a gearing system. Retired 1910 and scrapped; the bell went to a local school.
2	S.H. Harmon	4-4-0			1881	Wood burning. Retired in 1912; scrapped in 1937.
3		0-4-2T	Baldwin Locomotive Works		1887	
4		0-4-2	Baldwin Locomotive Works		1889	
