= United Railways and Electric Company =

Street railway company in Baltimore, Maryland, US

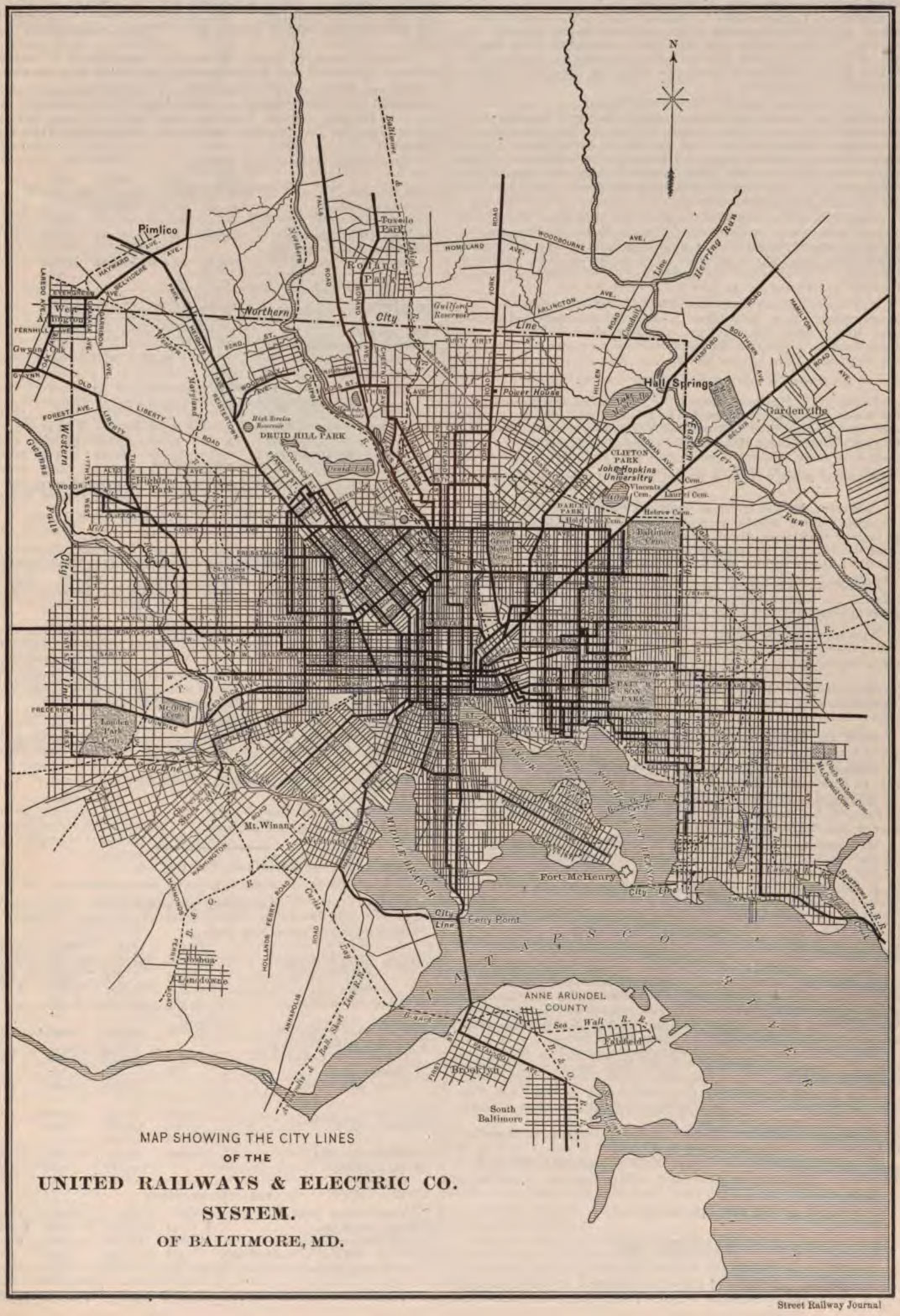
- 1900 map

Overview
- Status: Defunct
- Owner: United Railways and Electric Company
- Locale: Baltimore

Service
- Type: street railway
- Operator(s): United Railways and Electric Company

Technical
- Line length: 433 mi (697 km)
- Track gauge: 5 ft 4 1/2 in (1,638 mm)
- Electrification: 575 V DC Overhead line

The United Railways and Electric Company was a street railway company in the Baltimore Metropolitan Area of the U.S. state of Maryland from 1899 to 1935.

== History ==
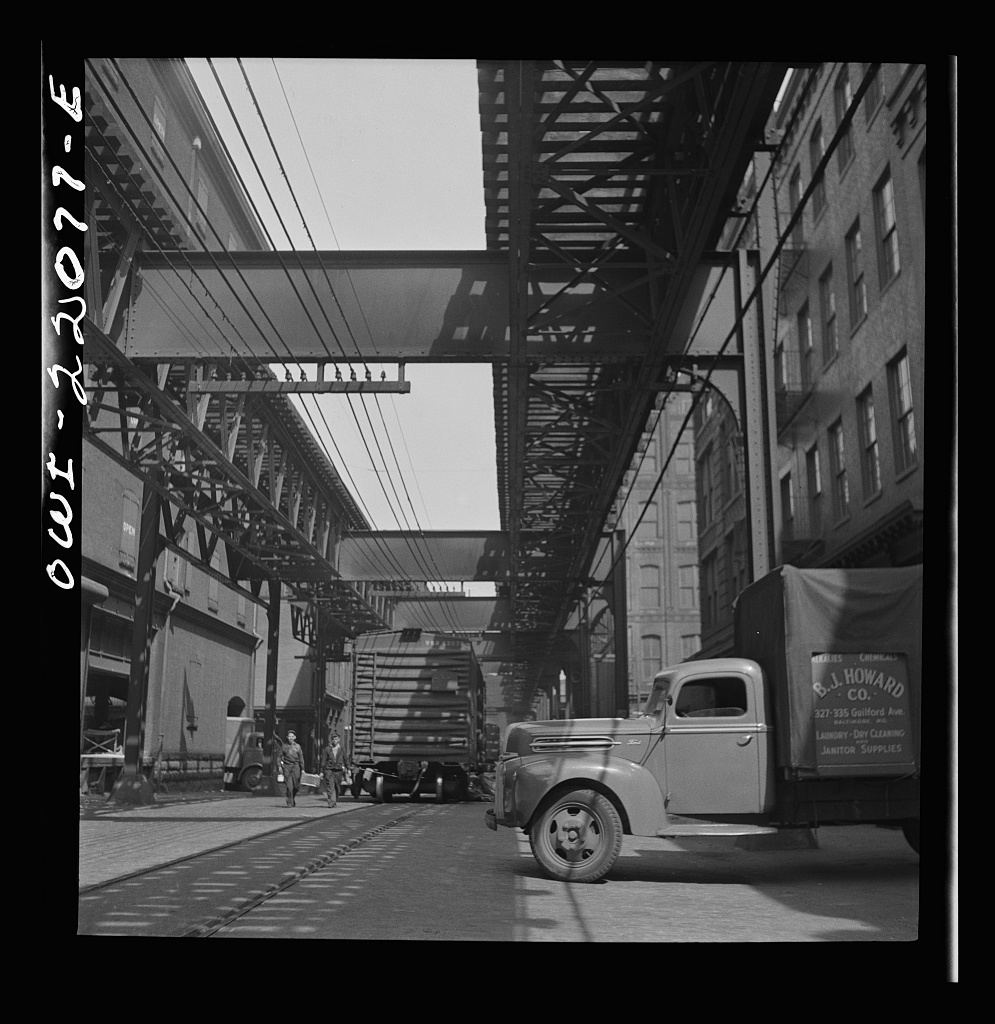
The viaduct that carried streetcars over Guilford Ave

In May 1893, a three-stop elevated railway opened over Guilford Avenue to carry streetcars over the Northern Central Railway. The viaduct spanned eight blocks and was discontinued in 1950.

In 1900, the company built the Power Plant in Baltimore's Inner Harbor to provide electrical power to the system. The system suffered extensive damage during the Great Baltimore Fire of 1904, but the company rebuilt under the supervision of its president, John Mifflin Hood.

United Railways declared bankruptcy in 1933. The company was reorganized in 1935 as the Baltimore Transit Company. In 1970 the transit company was absorbed into the Maryland Transit Administration, a public agency.

== List of streetcar lines ==
The date that the line was replaced with a bus or abandoned (the day after the last full day of streetcar operation) is shown.

Radiating from downtown in a clockwise order

- Falls Road Line: April 24, 1949 (ca. 1914 along Falls Road south of 36th Street)
- Roland Park Line: April 14, 1940
- Lakeside Line: January 29, 1950
- St. Paul Street Line: June 22, 1947
- Boulevard Line: June 22, 1947
- Bedford Square Line: June 22, 1947
- Guilford Avenue Elevated: January 1950
- Towson Line (York Road; Govanstown): November 3, 1963
- Harford Road Line: June 17, 1956 (October 4, 1936, north of Parkville)
- Belair Road Line (Gay Street): November 3, 1963
- Monument Street Line: March 21, 1948
- Orleans Street Line
- East Fayette Street Line
- Highlandtown Line: July 29, 1950
- Back and Middle Rivers Line: February 11, 1942
- Sparrows Point Line (Dundalk): August 31, 1958
- Point Breeze Line: July 25, 1948
- Broadway Line: May 9, 1948
- Patterson Park Line: May 1948
- Highlandtown Short Line: March 5, 1950
- Hudson Street Line: June 8, 1952
- Canton Line (Highland Avenue): June 8, 1952
- Fort Avenue Line (Fort McHenry): December 13, 1948
- Ferry Bar Line: July 5, 1923
- Curtis Bay Line: March 21, 1948
- Westport Line: June 22, 1947
- Washington Boulevard Line (Columbia Avenue): January 1, 1939
- Halethorpe Line (Wilkens Avenue): November 16, 1935
- Catonsville Line (Frederick Road; Irvington): November 3, 1963
- West Baltimore Street Line: May 9, 1948
- Ellicott City Line (North Bend; Rolling Road): June 19, 1955 (September 18, 1954, east of Catonsville Junction)
- Edmondson Avenue Line (Windsor Hills): November 3, 1963
- Garrison Boulevard Line: June 17, 1956
- Gilmor Street Line (Fulton Avenue): August 1, 1948
- Carey Street Line: December 13, 1948
- Pennsylvania Avenue Line: June 8, 1952
- Liberty Heights Avenue Line: September 4, 1955
- Park Heights Avenue Line (Pimlico; Pikesville): June 27, 1948
- Emory Grove Line: July 3, 1932
- Druid Hill Avenue Line: June 27, 1948
- Madison Avenue Line: May 9, 1948
- Linden Avenue Line: September 4, 1955
- John Street Line: December 2, 1938

Cross connections and branches

- Bay Shore Line: September 1947
- Brunswick Street Line
- Caroline Street Line (Central): March 6, 1938
- Centre Street Line: August 1937?
- Dolphin Street Line: March 6, 1938
- East Federal Street Line: January 1, 1939
- Fairfield Line
- Fish House Road Line: July 30, 1932
- Fort Howard Line: October 20, 1952
- Fremont Avenue Line: March 25, 1950
- Gorsuch Avenue Line (Waverly): June 22, 1947
- Key Avenue Line: September 14, 1950
- Lorraine Line: February 28, 1954
- North Avenue Line: January 10, 1954
- Presstman Street Line: December 15, 1919
- Preston Street Line: January 1, 1939
- Sweetair Line
- Union Avenue Line: April 24, 1949
- Washington Street Line (Wolfe Street): March 5, 1950
- West Arlington Line (Belvedere; Mount Washington): September 4, 1955 (September 14, 1950, east of Belvedere)
- Woodlawn Line (Gwynn Oak Park; Powhatan): September 4, 1955 (June 10, 1917, west of Woodlawn)

== See also ==
- List of surface transit routes in the Baltimore Metropolitan Area
- Baltimore Streetcar Museum
- History of MTA Maryland
