= Johnston Building =

Johnston Building may refer to:

- Johnston Building (Baltimore, Maryland), listed on the NRHP
- Johnston Building (Charlotte, North Carolina)
