= Hendler Creamery =

- U.S. National Register of Historic Places
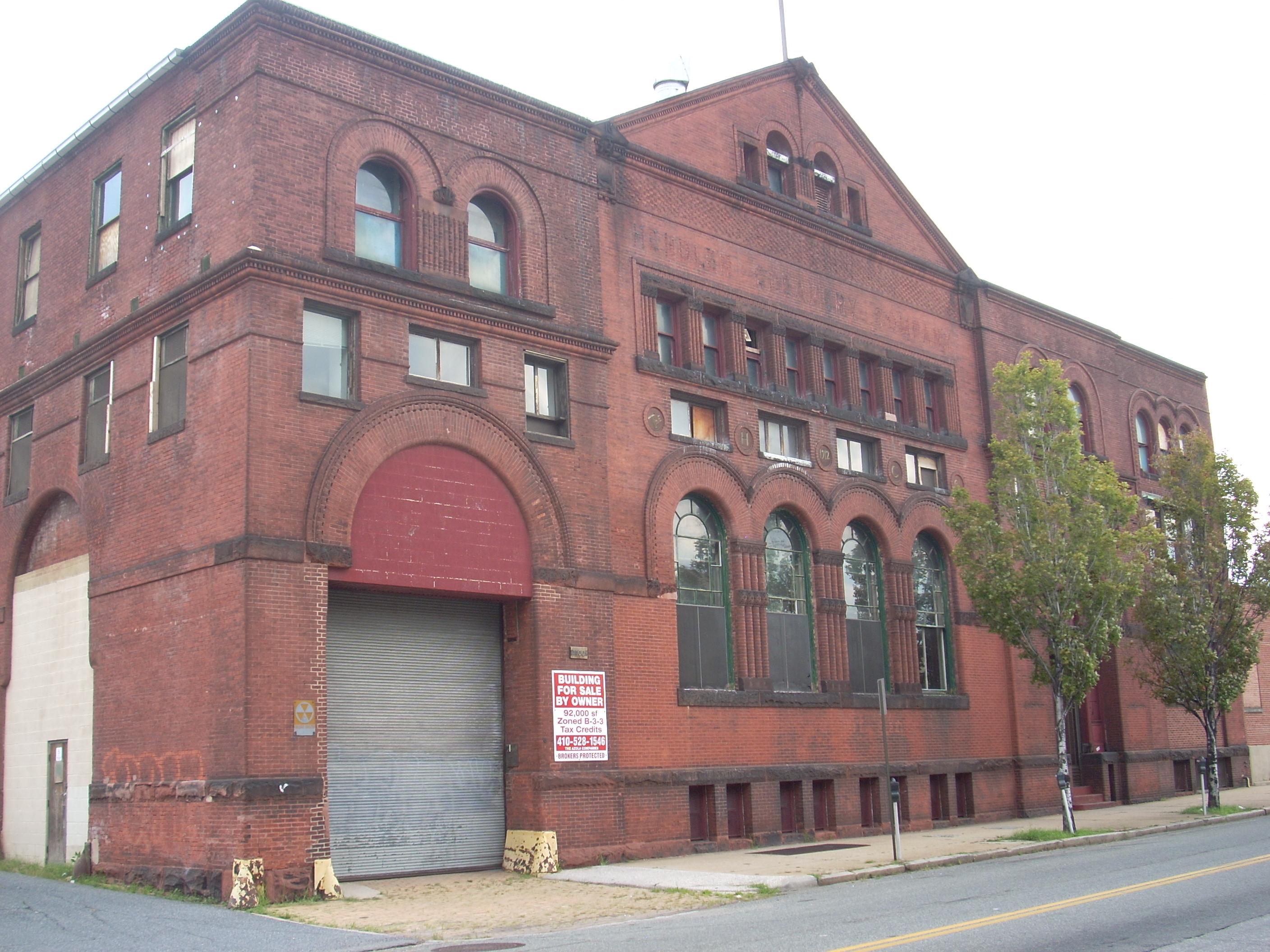
- Hendler Creamery in 2011

- Location within Baltimore Location within Maryland Location within the United States
- Location: 1100 E. Baltimore St. & 1107 E. Fayette St., Baltimore, Maryland
- Coordinates: 39°17′28″N 76°36′8″W
- Area: 1.5 acres (0.61 ha)
- Built: 1892
- Architect: Jackson C. Gott
- Architectural style: Romanesque, Early Commercial
- NRHP reference No.: 07001032
- Added to NRHP: December 20, 2007

Hendler Creamery was an industrial complex in Jonestown, Baltimore, Maryland. It is historically significant in three areas: transportation, performing arts, and industry. It was originally a cable-car powerhouse that lasted only six years; after cable cars were replaced by overhead electric street cars around the turn of the century, the building became a theater; and finally a popular ice cream factory that lasted for many decades as a notable part of Baltimore culture and heritage.

The building, deemed structurally sound in 2007, was purchased in 2012 by a local developer who promised to renovate it. Instead nothing happened. Indeed the roof was intentionally removed exposing the interior to the elements, necessitating the building's complete demolition a few years later. The property was stripped of historic valuables and then fully demolished, in September 2024, to make way for a privately owned "park". The building was a case study in the phenomenon known as demolition by neglect.

== History ==
=== Construction and architect ===
The original cable car powerhouse was designed by Baltimore-based architect Jackson C. Gott (1829-1909). The 59,340-square-foot (5,513 m^{2}) three-story brick Richardsonian Romanesque building was constructed in 1892. Cable-cars necessitated massive arched doors and a mezzanine floor. The exterior walls were red face brick with red mortar joints and Potomac red Seneca stone trim. The front on East Baltimore Street had four large contiguous Romanesque Revival half-round arched openings (see photo). In reviewing the building plans, The Baltimore Sun wrote in 1892 that, "it would be one of the most prominent structures in that part of the city." Additions were later added by Hendler's Creamery in 1915-20 and 1949. It is connected to a one-story brick building from the 1960s. The second building complex is a 33,504-square-foot (3,112.6 m^{2}) brick warehouse structure built from 1923 to 1927.

=== Cable-car powerhouse ===
The building was created to be a cable-car powerhouse for the Baltimore City Passenger Railway Company, and served that function for a mere six years, from 1892 to 1898. The building played an important role in Baltimore's transportation history as cable-car mass transit was first developed to replace the horse-car lines operating for half a century since the late 1850s. The building powered the run of cable from Gay Street to North Avenue, using two Reynolds compound non-condensing Corliss steam engines. These propelled a sheave which pulled a continuous loop of cable and moved the car at a speed of around 11 miles per hour. Just like a subway line today, this line was designated by a color, the Red Line, and ran from East North Avenue, south down North Gay Street, curving around to the east on East Baltimore Street, and then on further east to Bank Street and Patterson Park in East Baltimore's developing Highlandtown neighborhood. The total mileage distance was 10.7.

Electric-powered cars with overhead lines began replacing cable cars on the Red Line on August 30, 1898, as a more economical and faster means of mass transit. Cables were removed immediately, but the expense of extracting the underground pulleys, sheaves and other steel/iron fittings was too much, and in most instances they were simply covered over as streets were gradually repaired and resurfaced.

With the switchover, the Baltimore City Passenger Railway Company was absorbed into the United Railways and Electric Company. UREC held onto the building with its powerful electric generators connected to great furnaces and boilers with four parallel smokestacks. There was a conveyor belt system for loading coal from moored harbor barges, connected to waterfront terminal facilities further south in the Baltimore Harbor, that was supplied by the Baltimore and Ohio Railroad and the Western Maryland Railway trains arriving from the mines in the Appalachian Mountains. For a few decades, the rear half of the building was a "trouble station" for trolleys, and the front was rented to the U.S. Navy (Maryland) Naval Reserves for use as a drill-room.

In all, the two competing Baltimore cable-car companies – the Baltimore Traction Company (BTC) and Baltimore City Passenger Railway (BCPR) – built six powerhouses in the city, three each. This was a significant capital expense for an industrial enterprise that only lasted from 1891 to 1899. Of the three and a half surviving powerhouses, the Hendler Creamery building is the only one listed on the National Register of Historic Places. Another Gott designed powerhouse survives today as the Charles Theatre (BCPR) building, while the third totally extant powerhouse (BTC) lies three blocks south at 1110 East Pratt Street by Central Avenue. The former Baltimore Traction Company's Druid Hill Avenue powerhouse and car barn, south of Druid Hill Park in the northwest city, lost half of its structure in 2005 in a spectacular 5-alarm blaze. It is a massive Victorian and Romanesque-style red brick-and-stone trim structure. The Epworth Powerhouse (BTC) on Mosher Street in West Baltimore was torn down years before. The last powerhouse (BCPR) on South Eutaw Street, south of West Baltimore Street, succumbed long ago to the pressures of razing and urban redevelopment.

=== Yiddish theatre ===
After the replacement of the cable car by electric trolleys, the Hendler Creamery was then converted into a performance space by Baltimore-born James Lawrence Kernan (1838-1912). He was a theater manager, entrepreneur, and philanthropist, who earlier in his life had fought for the Confederates, been captured and held as a prisoner till the war's end at the brutal Point Lookout prisoner of war camp at the southern tip of St. Mary's County. Returning to civilian life, among other ventures, he started a combination hotel and German Rathskeller and founded Kernan Hospital, which still exists today as the University of Maryland Rehabilitation & Orthopaedic Institute.

Under Kernan's ownership, a second floor, containing an auditorium and dressing rooms, was installed above the first-floor engine room. He named it the Convention Hall Theater. It operated primarily as a Yiddish theater from 1903 to 1912, serving the largely Jewish immigrant population. Some of the city's earliest motion pictures were also shown here by Kernan. Yiddish theater was first performed in Baltimore in the mid-1880s at Concordia Hall, an aristocratic club of Baltimore German Jews. It burnt down in 1891.

The building's conversion to a theater links it to Baltimore's early-20th century performing arts history, which includes melodrama, movies, opera, vaudeville, as well as the Yiddish theater.

=== Hendler Ice Cream Company ===
The building's most important and longest historical legacy came when it was purchased by the Hendler Ice Cream Company in 1912 for $40,000 and converted to the country's first fully automated ice cream factory.

Besides producing one of Baltimore's favorite brands of ice cream, it played a major role in the development of the nation's ice cream business. Many important pioneering industry innovations were developed over the next 50 years in this building, including new kinds of packaging; the blade sharpener, which produced smoother ice cream; and fast freezing, which allowed ice cream to be frozen with a liquid cream texture. The adjoining building at 1107 East Fayette Street, built in the 1920s as part of the Hendler Creamery complex, is also significant, notably in the creation of one of the nation's first ice cream delivery systems by refrigerated truck. As the Maryland Historical Society noted, "The ice cream was virtually everywhere in Maryland, as it was distributed to over 400 stores at the company’s peak, which kept the production lines humming. The factory ran six days a week with vanilla ice cream being made almost everyday. Vanilla, chocolate, and strawberry were production mainstays, but the creamery dabbled in more exotic flavors as well. Hutzler's department store sold several varieties, including ginger and peppermint. For the Southern Hotel, Hendlers supplied a tomato sorbet which was served as a side dish rather than dessert. The eggnog ice cream was produced each year at Christmas time. Hendler made with real rum, was a major hit. The factory also cranked out other holiday-themed products, such as an Independence Day treat made with vanilla, strawberry, and blueberry ice creams and a Mother’s Day cake topped with a silk screen of James McNeill Whistler’s portrait of his mother."

The creamery closed in the 1970s.

== Historic significance ==
Of the six cable-car powerhouses ever built in Baltimore, the Hendler building was the only one added to the National Register of Historic Places, in 2007, due to its important role in three areas of Baltimore history: transportation, performing arts, and industry. Prior to the 1950s, the neighborhood was primarily Eastern European and Jewish, later transitioning to predominately African American. The Yiddish Theater and later creamery are a part of Baltimore's Jewish history and heritage. The nearby Jewish Museum of Maryland holds an extensive archive of Hendler Company and family memorabilia. It was the nation's first fully automated ice cream factory, and one of the most popular brands in Maryland.

== Demolition by neglect ==
The building was deemed structurally sound in 2007. Five years later, Commercial Group, a Maryland-based developer headed by Kevin Johnson, bought the building for $1.08 million with plans to restore it for mixed-use residential and recreational. This never happened. Instead, citing structural deterioration, city authorities approved its demolition, despite protests the building could be saved. Johnson himself had many ties to city authorities including donations to political campaigns. In 2023 Johnson removed the roof, opening the interior to the elements; destruction was now only a matter of time, a fait accompli. Johnson was never fined by city authorities for code violations nor did he repair or mitigate the ongoing damage he partly caused.

A non-profit faith-based organization across the street, House of Freedom (formerly Helping Up), purchased the building, from Johnson, contingent on the city allowing the non-profit to fully demolish the building. The deal was done, and the new owners salvaged the property, snagging large quantities of ornamental stone, brick, wood, floors, ceilings, glass, man-hole covers, etc.. all reportedly shrink-wrapped and put into "storage". Even many bricks were saved. Some of the salvaged items will "likely" be incorporated into "some sort" of memorial, according to the organization. The demolition was completed in September 2024. The land will become a private park, owned by House of Freedom, "It won't be a public park per se, but we may make it available for certain community events in Jonestown," said the owners of the now stripped and demolished historic place.

A pattern of abuse in Baltimore was noted by a local architect, "This just keeps on happening. A developer or builder makes a nice computer model and gets permission to build. Then, pfft, nothing happens. They just let the property rot for years, and then they say, 'Oh, gee, it has to be demolished!'" The phenomenon happens frequently enough it's called "demolition by neglect" (DBN). The Hendler building became a case study in DBN, "a striking case" according to the University of Baltimore Law Review. It states:

Hendler Creamery is an extreme example of a historic structure that went for years without maintenance of its significant architectural features. The historical significance of the creamery is now lost because the Code and the Rules and Regulations were not strong enough to preempt neglectful practices that caused the building to seriously erode.

== Gallery ==
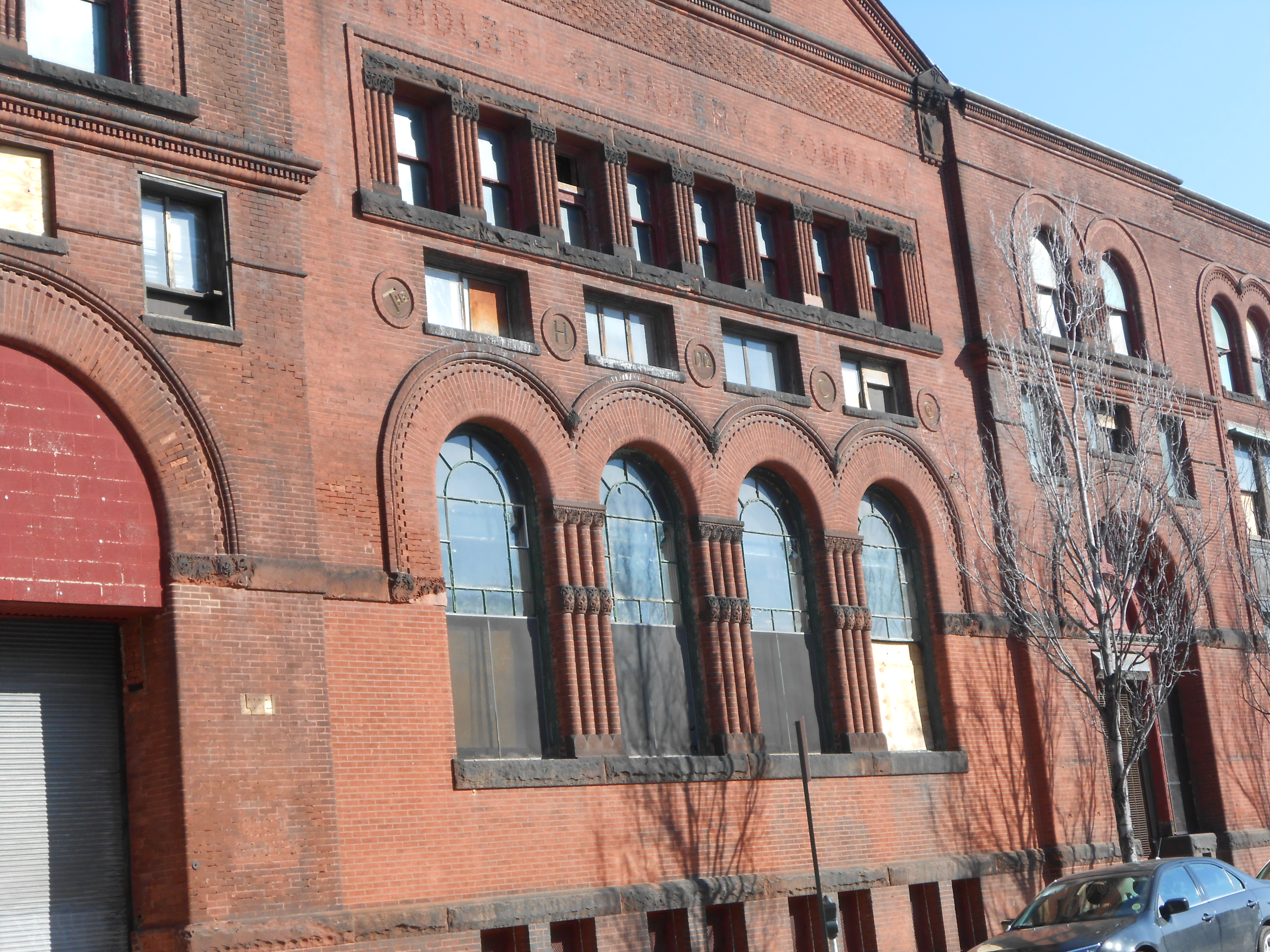
Front view.

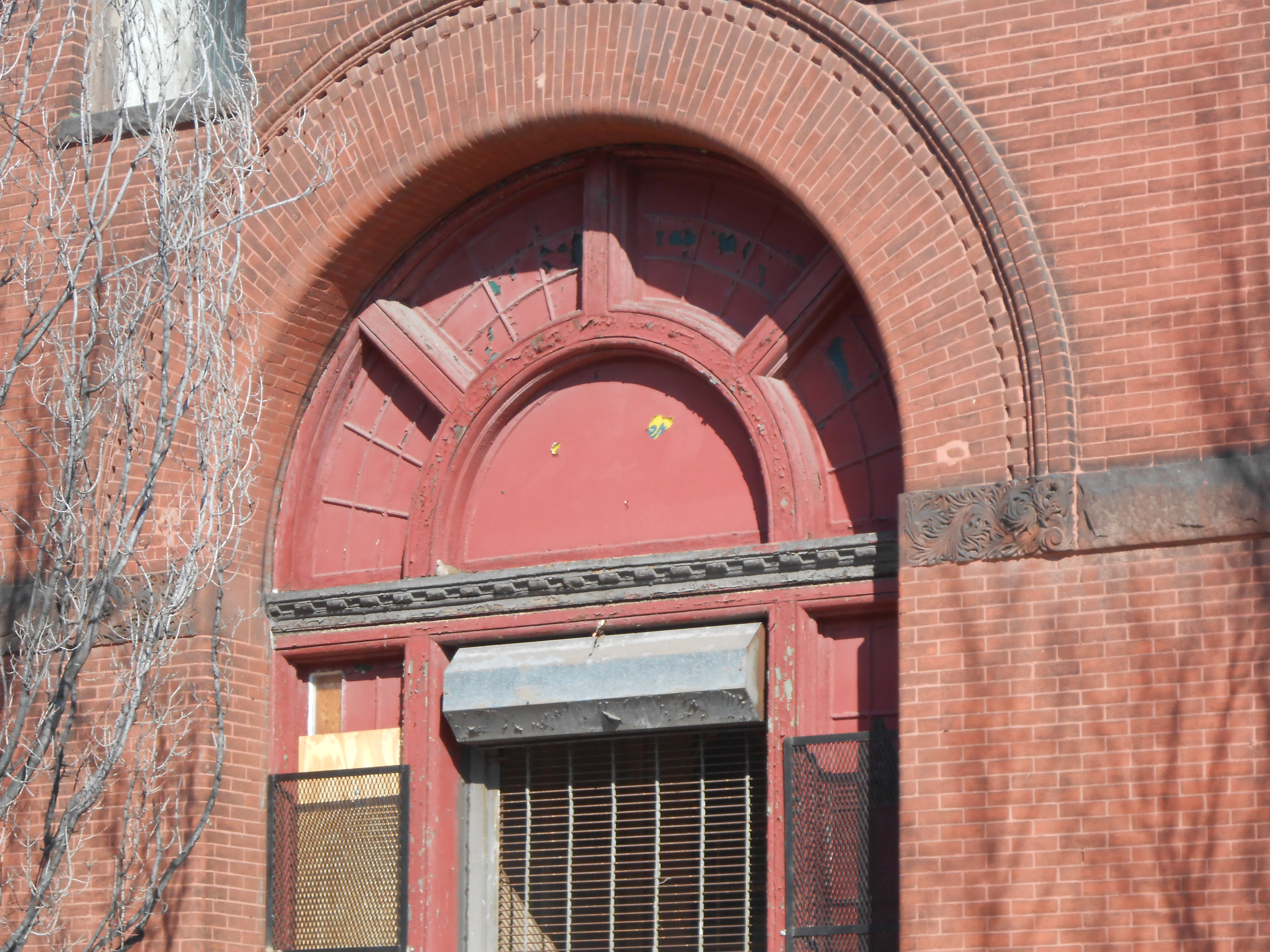
Front door detail.

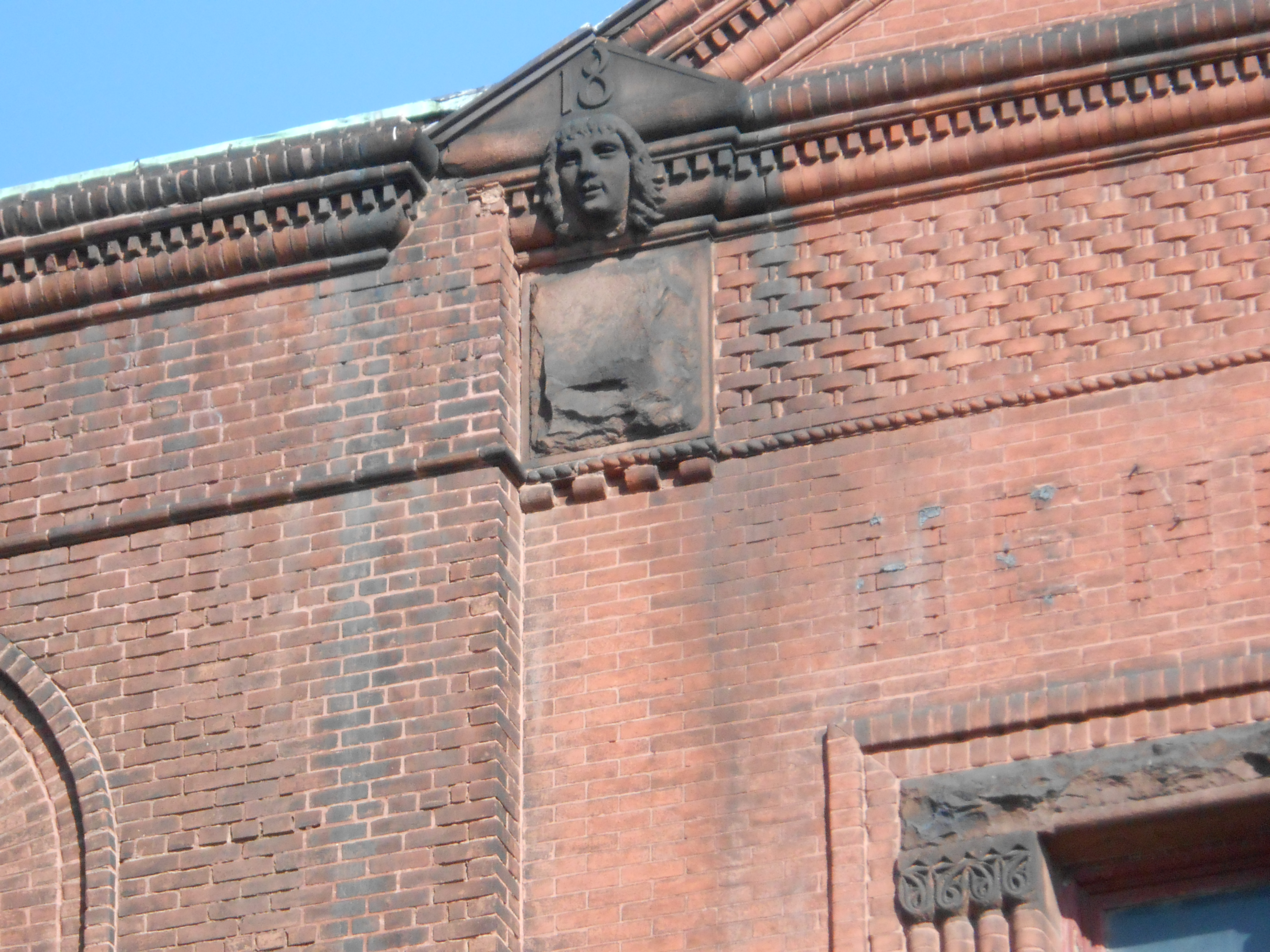
Medallion with man's head and the first two digits of year built -"18". Note the basket weave design of the brick pattern.

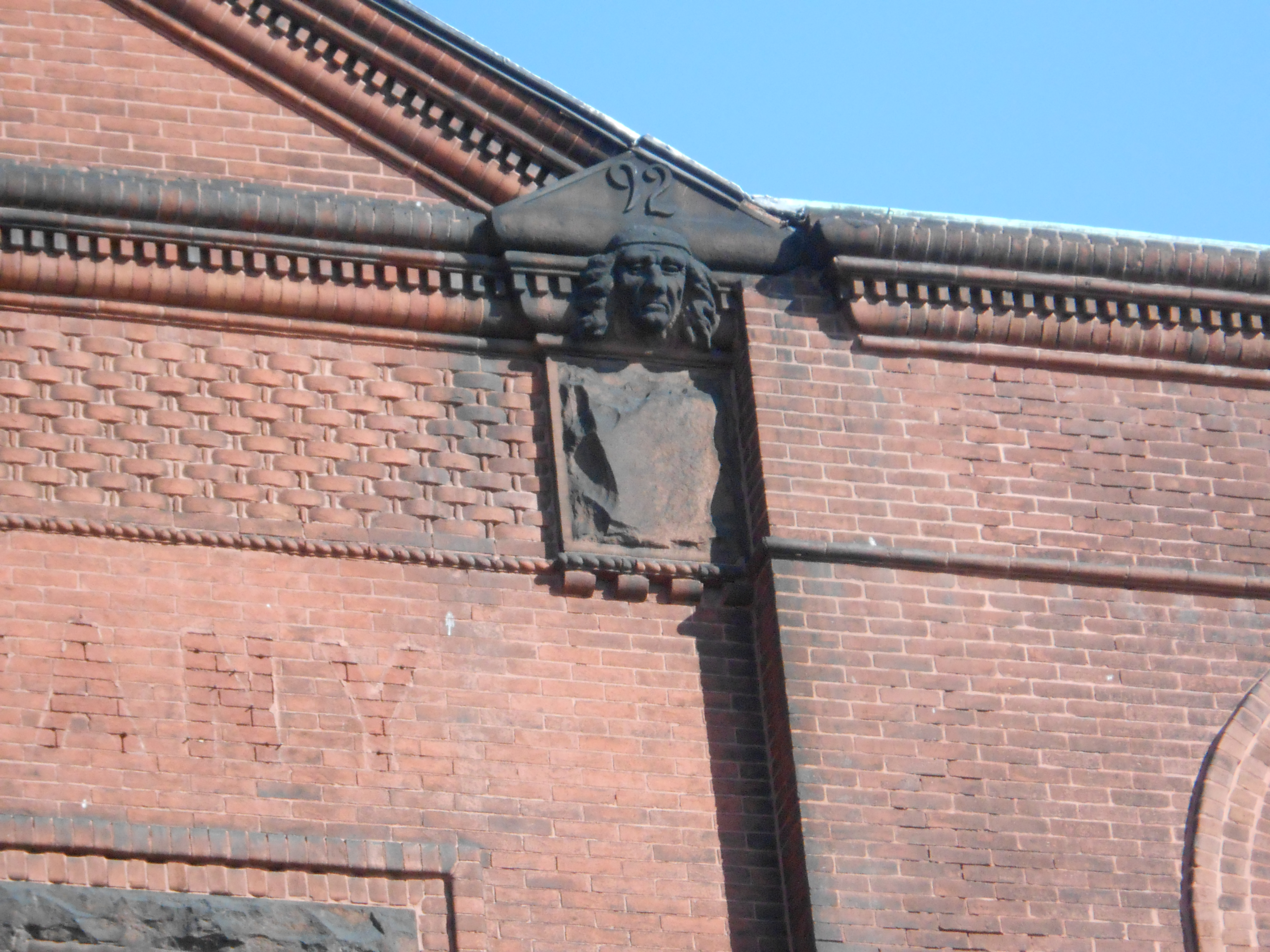
Medallion with woman's head and second two digits of the year built - "92"

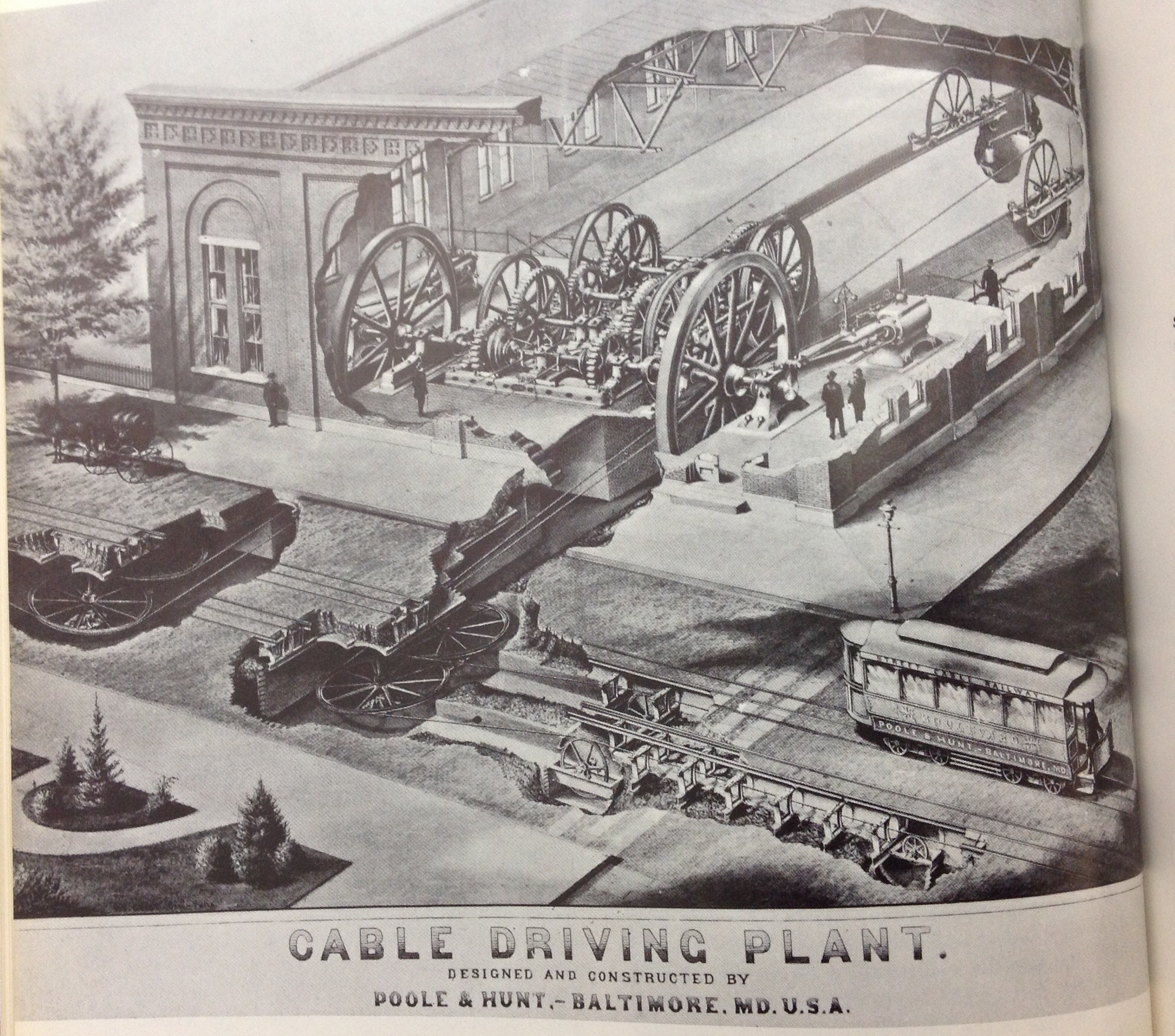
A prototypical/hypothetical drawing that demonstrates how cable powerhouses like Hendler operated. Cable Driving Plant, Designed and Constructed by Poole & Hunt, Baltimore, MD. Drawing by P.F. Goist, circa 1882.
