= Jackson C. Gott =

American architect (1829–1909)

Jackson C. Gott (1829–1909) was an American architect. Gott was born in Baltimore County, practiced in and around Baltimore all his life, and was named a Fellow of the American Institute of Architects in 1889.

== Work ==
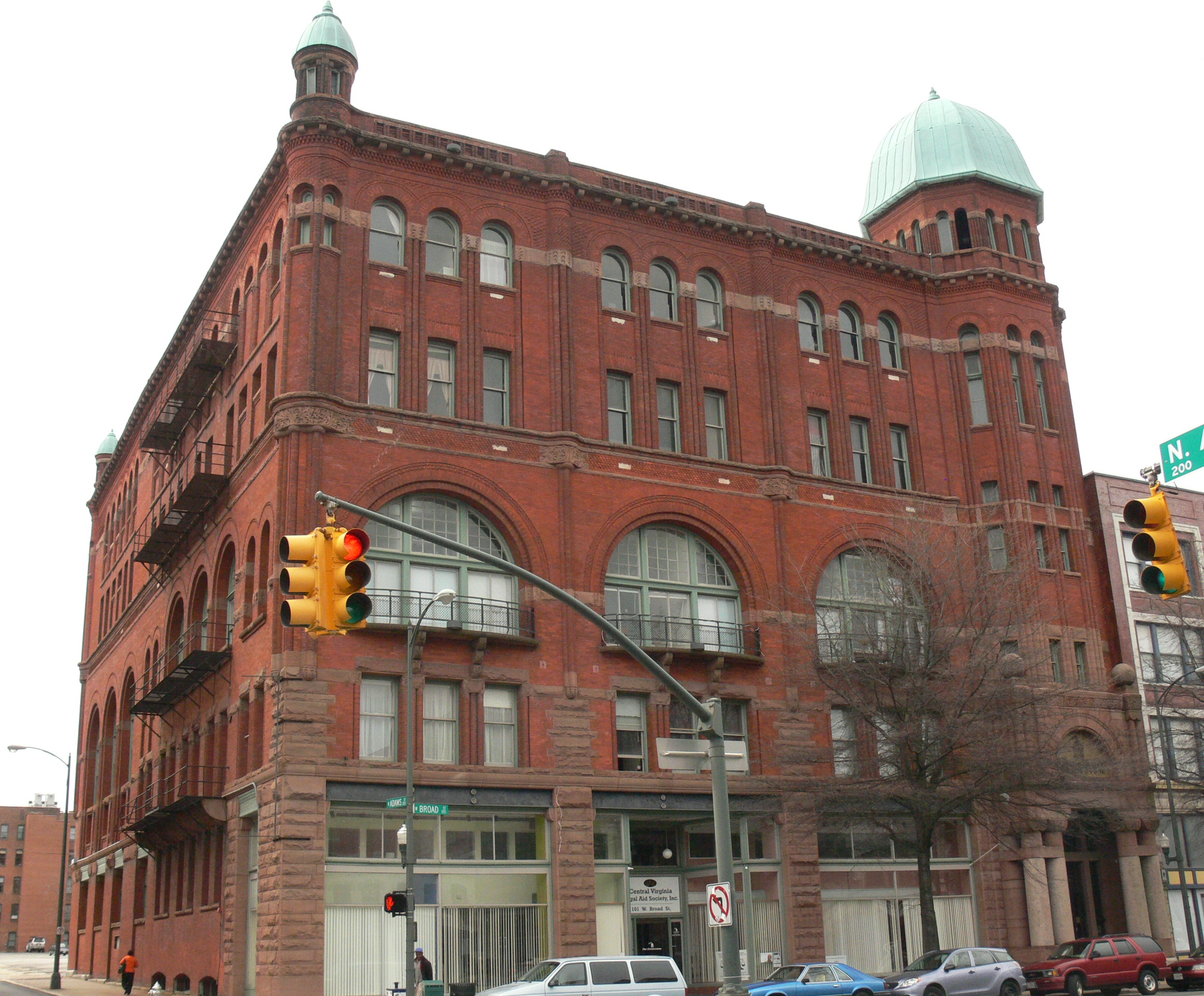
Renaissance Building, formerly the Masonic Temple, Richmond, Virginia, completed 1893

Buildings designed by him which survive and are listed on the National Register of Historic Places include:

- Johnson Building, 26-30 S. Howard St., Baltimore, 1880
- Rombro Building, 22–24 S. Howard St., Baltimore, 1881
- Governor John Walter Smith House, 104 S. Church St., Snow Hill, Maryland, 1890
- main building of the Hendler Creamery, 1100 E Baltimore St & 1107 E Fayette St., Baltimore, 1892
- Renaissance Building, formerly the Masonic Temple, 101-107 W. Broad Street, Richmond, Virginia, constructed 1888-1893
- Southern District Police Station, 28 E. Ostend St., Baltimore, 1896
- One or more buildings in Union Bridge Historic District, Roughly bounded by Bellevue, E. Locust, Buttersburg Alley, Church, Whyte, W. Locust and the Western Maryland RR tracks, Union Bridge, MD
- One or more buildings in Federal Hill South Historic District, Roughly bounded by Cross St., Olive St., Marshall St., Ostend St., Fort Ave. and Covington St., Baltimore

Gott's work not on the National Register includes:

- the Charles Theatre, Baltimore, 1892
- the Maryland Penitentiary, now the Metropolitan Transition Center, Baltimore, 1894
- central section of the Worcester County Courthouse, Snow Hill, Maryland
