= Maryland Theater =

There are at least two notable theaters called the Maryland Theater or Maryland Theatre

- Maryland Theater (Baltimore) (defunct)
- Maryland Theater (Hagerstown)
