= Union Bridge =

Union Bridge may refer to:

- Union Bridge, Ottawa, in Canada, a predecessor of the Chaudière Bridge
- Union Bridge, Aberdeen, in Scotland
- Union Bridge, Tweed, between England and Scotland
- Union Bridge, Maryland, a town in the United States
  - Union Bridge Historic District
- Union Bridge Company, a former American bridge builder
