= Hotel Kernan =

- U.S. National Register of Historic Places
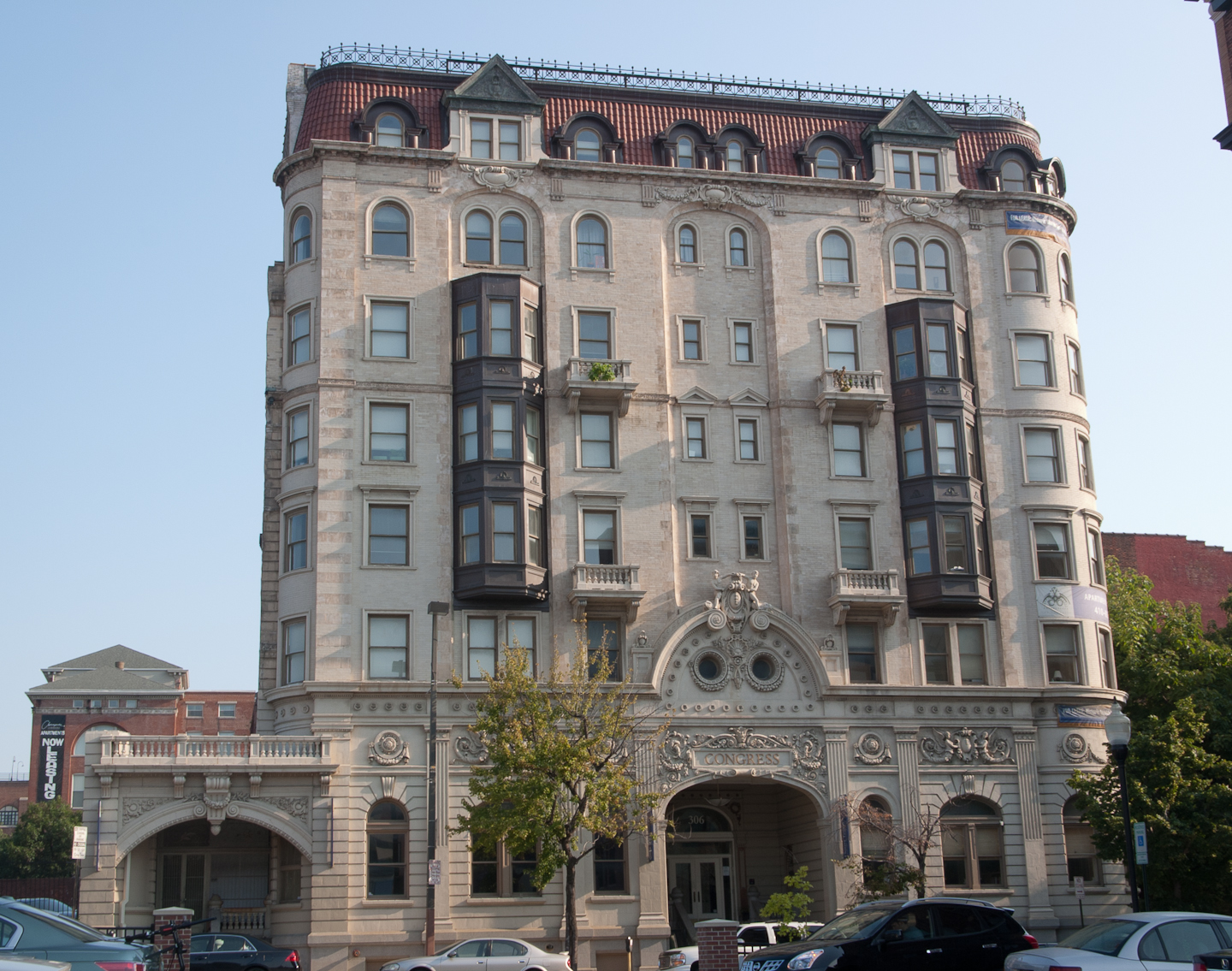
- Hotel Kernan, August 2011

- Location within Baltimore Location within Maryland Location within the United States
- Location: 306-312 W. Franklin St., Baltimore, Maryland
- Coordinates: 39°17′42.5″N 76°37′13.5″W
- Area: less than one acre
- Built: 1903
- Architect: Allen, J.D. Co.; Thomas, D.W. & G.H.
- Architectural style: Renaissance
- NRHP reference No.: 99001079
- Added to NRHP: September 3, 1999

Hotel Kernan, also known as the Congress Hotel, is a historic hotel located at Baltimore, Maryland, United States. It is a six-story plus mansard roof, French Renaissance Revival-style structure detailed in brick and terra cotta. It is constructed of steel and reinforced concrete and is U-shaped in plan. It was designed in 1903 by Philadelphia architect John Allen for theatrical impresario James Lawrence Kernan (1838-1912), who lived at the hotel until his death in 1912.

Hotel Kernan was listed on the National Register of Historic Places in 1999.
