= Masonic Temple (Richmond, Virginia) =

Historic building in Virginia, US

- U.S. National Register of Historic Places
- U.S. Historic district – Contributing property
- Virginia Landmarks Register
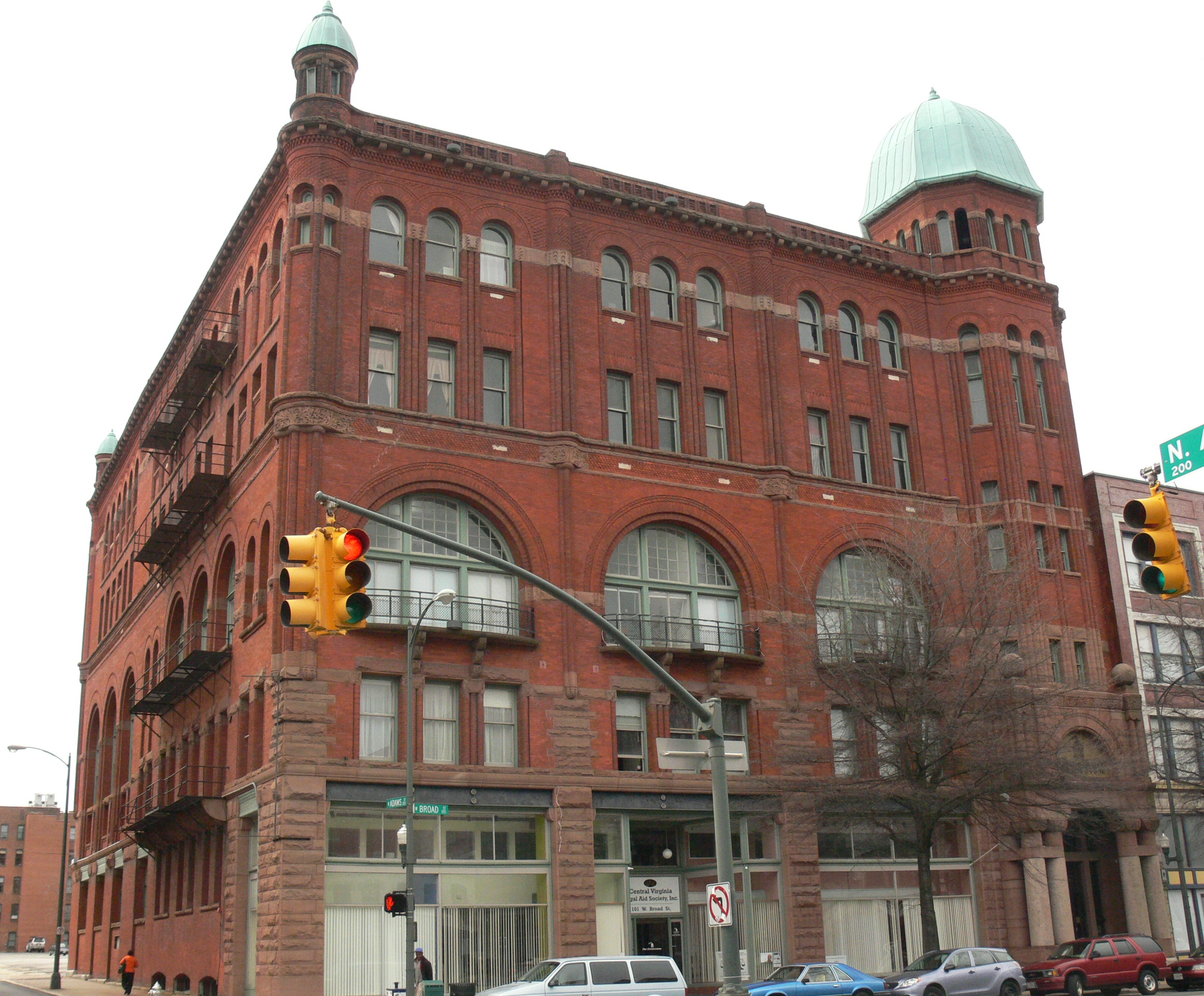
- Location: 101-107 W. Broad St., Richmond, Virginia
- Coordinates: 37°32′46″N 77°26′37″W
- Area: 0.3 acres (0.12 ha)
- Built: 1888-93
- Architect: Jackson C. Gott
- Architectural style: Richardsonian Romanesque
- Part of: Broad Street Commercial Historic District (ID87000611)
- NRHP reference No.: 83003305
- VLR No.: 127-0296

Significant dates
- Added to NRHP: February 10, 1983
- Designated CP: April 09, 1987
- Designated VLR: December 14, 1982

The Masonic Temple in Richmond, Virginia is a Richardsonian Romanesque style building built during 1888–1893, designed by Jackson C. Gott. The building was listed on the National Register of Historic Places in 1983.

It is a prominent building in downtown Richmond.

Its NRHP nomination asserts that the building is the finest example of Richardsonian Romanesque style architecture in the state, and others have asserted that at its time of construction it was "one of the 'most magnificent examples of modern architecture in the South.'"

The design by Gott was one of 17 submitted in a design competition.

The building was used for a 1905 function attended by U.S. President Theodore Roosevelt. It was used by the Masons until 1971. In 1982 the Richmond Foundation for the Arts acquired it with intended purpose of its serving as an arts center for the region.

At some later date the building housed a catering venue, office building and apartments.

== See also ==
- Mason's Hall (Richmond, Virginia), also NRHP-listed
