= Maryland Theater (Baltimore) =

American music theatre

Coordinates: 39°17′21.75″N 76°37′8.3″W

The Maryland Theater was a music venue in Baltimore, Maryland, home to that city's first jazz band, led by John Ridgely. It was originally built for James Lawrence Kernan (1838-1912) as a vaudeville house, in 1903, adjacent to his Hotel Kernan (later renamed the Congress Hotel). It included a rathskeller in the basement with some of the first music in town from a "jazz band" led by John Ridgley, at what became known later as "The Marble Bar", a musical venue even up to the 1980s. Located facing West Franklin Street, between North Paca Street and west of North Howard Street, which was one of the fanciest hotels in the city at the time constructed of Beaux Arts/Classical Revival style architecture. In the 1950s, the old Maryland Theatre was razed and temporarily replaced by a parking lot for the last days of the hotel.

Kernan was also a member of the city's Board of Park Commissioners and a member of the old Baltimore City Jail Board. He was also the founder of the James Lawrence Kernan Hospital at his "Radnor Park" estate in northwest Baltimore's Forest Park neighborhood near Woodlawn in suburban Baltimore County. The hospital built in the 1920s era with buildings around the old mansion of 1860-1867 construction of Greek Revival and Colonial Revival styled architecture. Today it is a part of the state's University of Maryland Medical Center as the "University of Maryland Rehabilitation & Orthopaedic Institute".

The old Kernan/Congress Hotel was renovated and restored in 2004-2005 as apartments and condos by the locally famous architect and construction firm, Streuver Brothers, Eccles and Rouse as one of their last renewal projects of three decades in the city.
