= Southern District Police Station =

- U.S. National Register of Historic Places
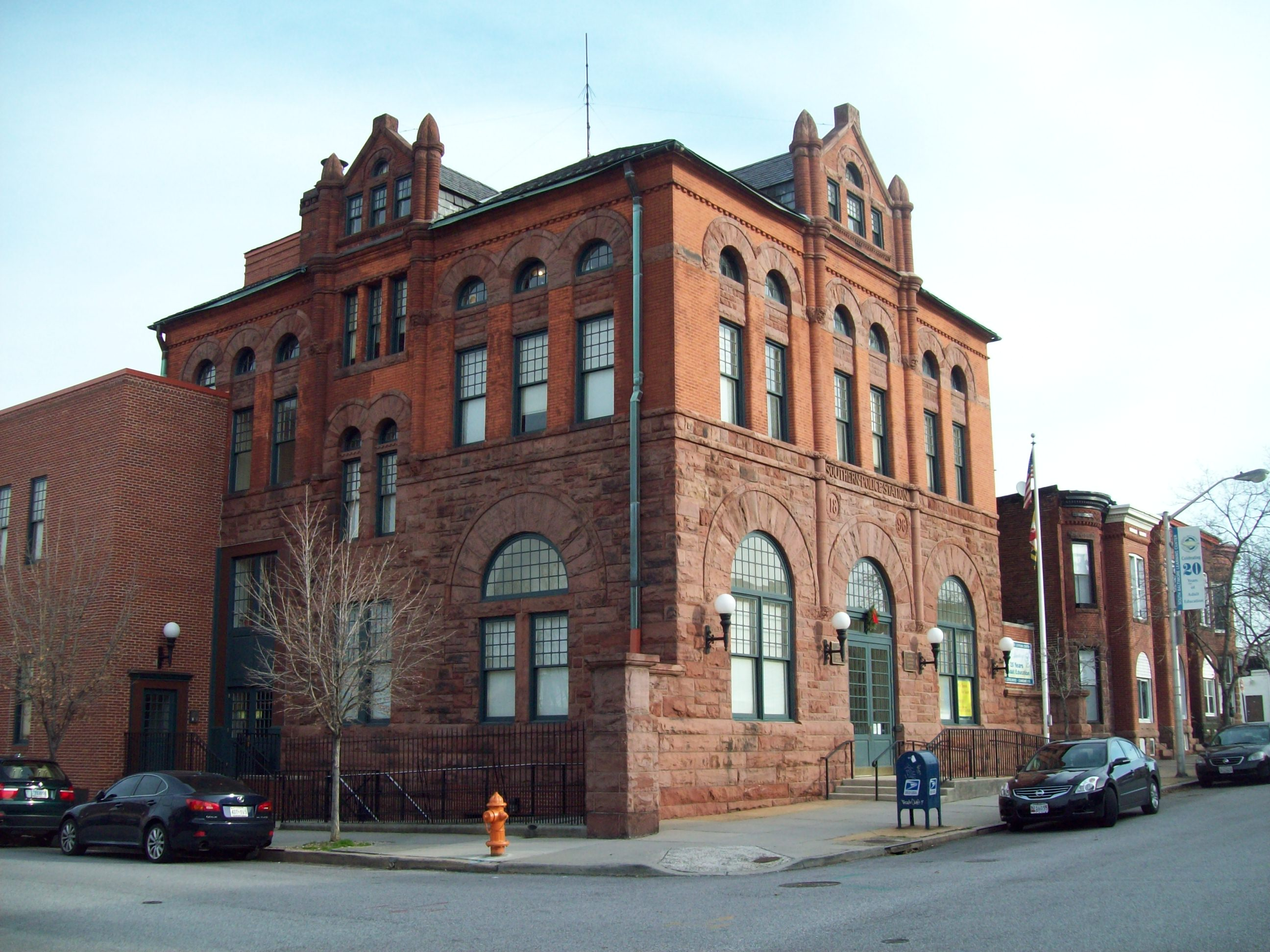
- Southern District Police Station, December 2011

- Location within Baltimore Location within Maryland Location within the United States
- Location: 28 E. Ostend St., Baltimore, Maryland
- Coordinates: 39°16′30″N 76°36′47″W
- Area: 0.2 acres (0.081 ha)
- Built: 1896
- Architect: Jackson C. Gott
- Architectural style: Romanesque
- NRHP reference No.: 01001373
- Added to NRHP: December 28, 2001

Southern District Police Station is a historic police station located at Baltimore, Maryland, United States. It is a monumental Romanesque Revival steel-framed building faced in stone and brick constructed in 1896. The station is composed of a three-story cubic main block, a two-story rear ell, and two additions built in the 1950s that fill most of the remainder of the corner lot.

The building remained in use by the Baltimore Police Department until the mid-1980s, when it was sold to a local non-profit group.

Southern District Police Station was listed on the National Register of Historic Places in 2001.
