= Lionel (artist) =

Canadian urban artist

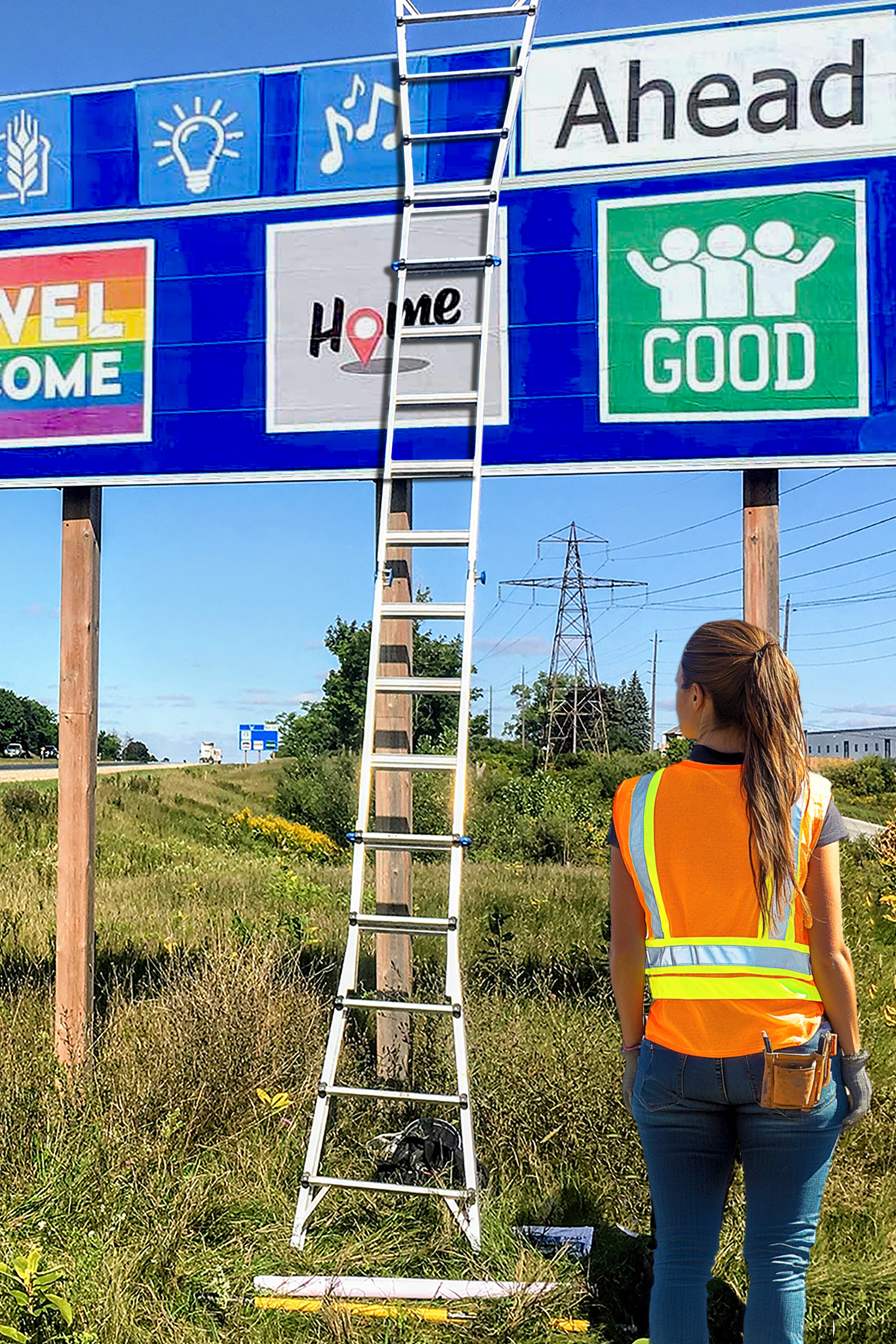
- Years active: 2021–present
- Known for: Street art, activist art, public installations
- Movement: Activist art
- Website: Lionel on Instagram

Lionel is an anonymous street artist based in Guelph, Ontario, known for street installations that focus on social, political, and environmental themes. Lionel presents work in public spaces to address topics such as cultural heritage, homelessness, and global conflicts. Projects have ranged from city-based installations and bus shelter ad-hacks to large-scale protests, contributing to local discussions on the role of street art in social activism.

Since appearing on the Guelph art scene in 2021, Lionel’s installations have highlighted neglected cultural sites and critiqued political issues, generating responses from both city officials and the public.

== Exhibitions and installations ==
- "Demolition by Neglect" (2024): Lionel wrapped Guelph’s historic McQuillan Bridge in orange material, calling attention to its deteriorating state. This installation led to increased discussion on cultural heritage preservation and prompted a prompt response from local authorities.
- "Creative Dissent" Exhibit (2024): Lionel’s work was included in the Creative Dissent exhibit at the Art Gallery of Guelph, focused on themes of protest and propaganda.
- "Where Are You Sleeping Tonight?" (2023): This installation on Wyndham Street North featured a modified shopping cart and suitcases, drawing attention to issues of homelessness and socio-economic disparity within the community.
- "Doctrine of Discovery" (2022): This paste-up depicted Pope Francis wearing a ceremonial headdress developed using a text overlay photo effect with wording from the foundational church directive that sanctioned colonial expansion.
- "Reign of Colour" (2021): A micro-mural on a downtown retaining wall, depicting running paint and a stenciled skyline of Guelph, celebrated the city’s cultural and architectural elements.
- "Do NOT Feed the Bear!" (2021): Installed around Carl Skelton’s Begging Bear statue at the Art Gallery of Guelph, this intervention featured mock eviction notices and offense tickets to critique issues of homelessness and restrictions on public space.

== Press coverage and responses ==
Lionel’s installations have been widely covered by local and national media outlets, including Guelph Today, Guelph Mercury, Village Report, and CBC. The Valentine’s Day 2024 bus shelter ad-hacks, a collaboration with Show Up Guelph featuring political messaging about the conflict in Gaza, drew responses from city officials and the Mayor of Guelph, generating further public discourse on unsanctioned art in public spaces.

== Legacy and impact ==
Lionel’s work addresses themes related to heritage preservation, visibility of marginalized communities, and the role of public art in activism. By working in accessible, everyday settings and maintaining anonymity, Lionel centers attention on the topics within his work rather than on personal recognition, embracing a philosophy of art as a platform for civic engagement.

== Gallery ==
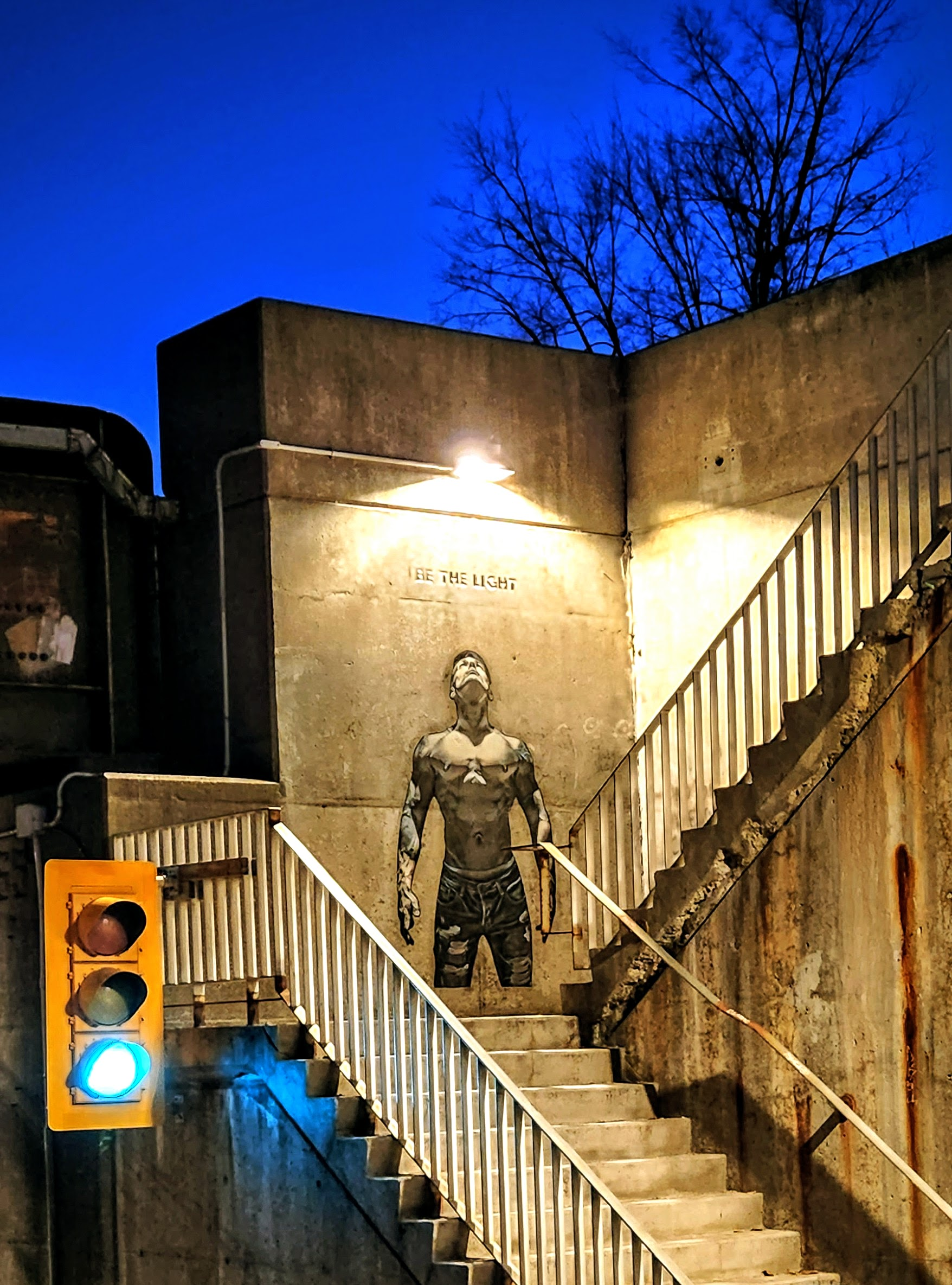

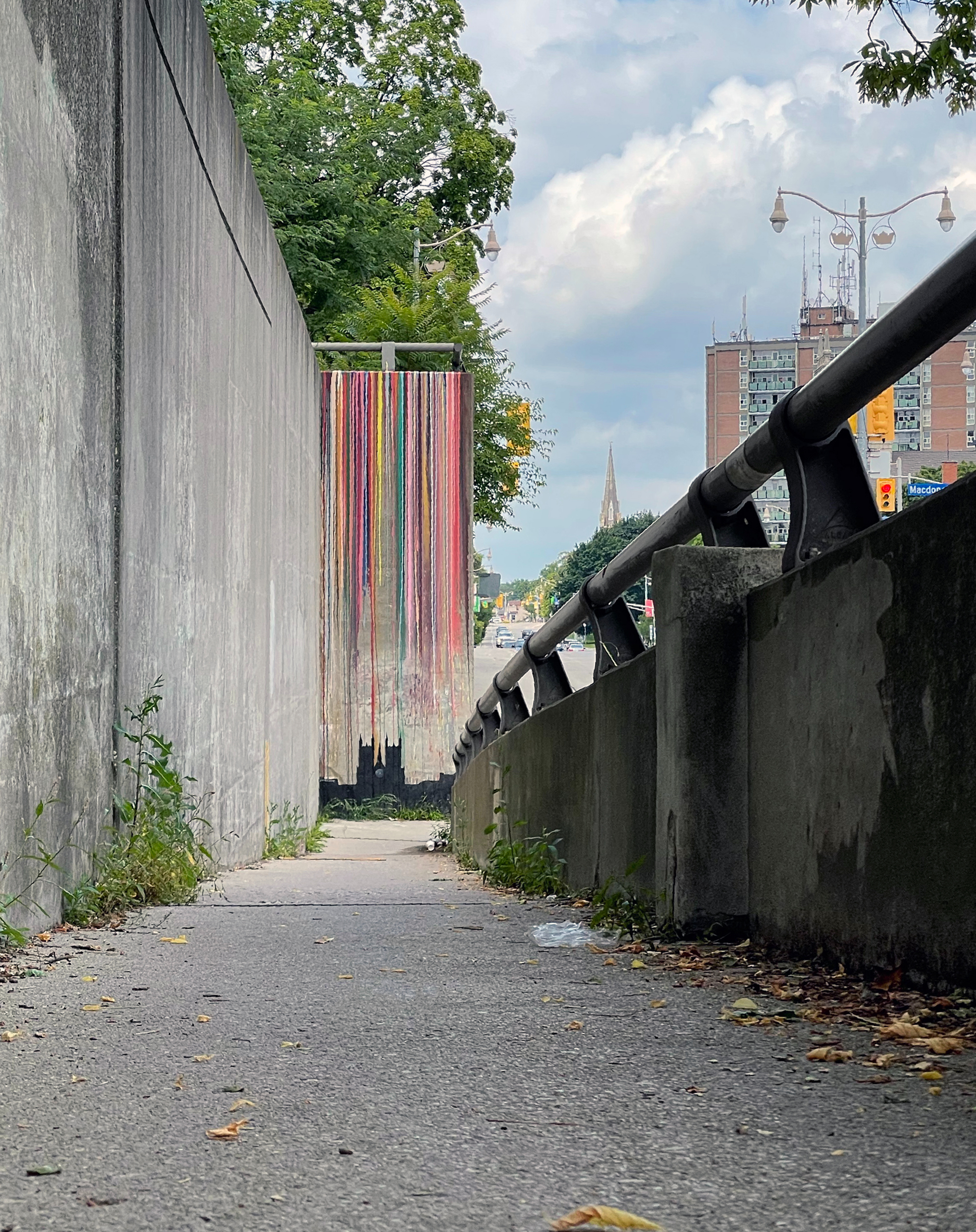

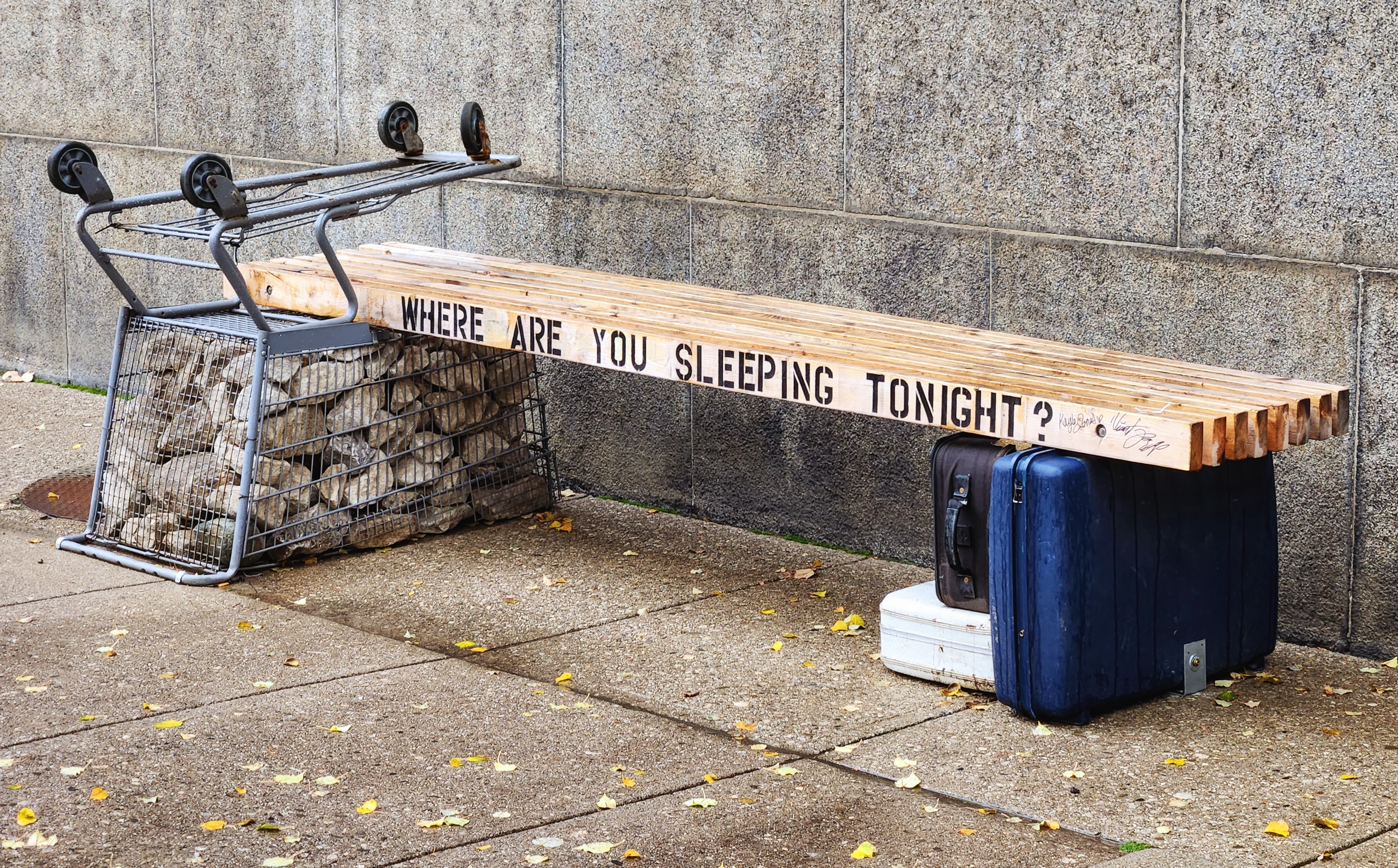

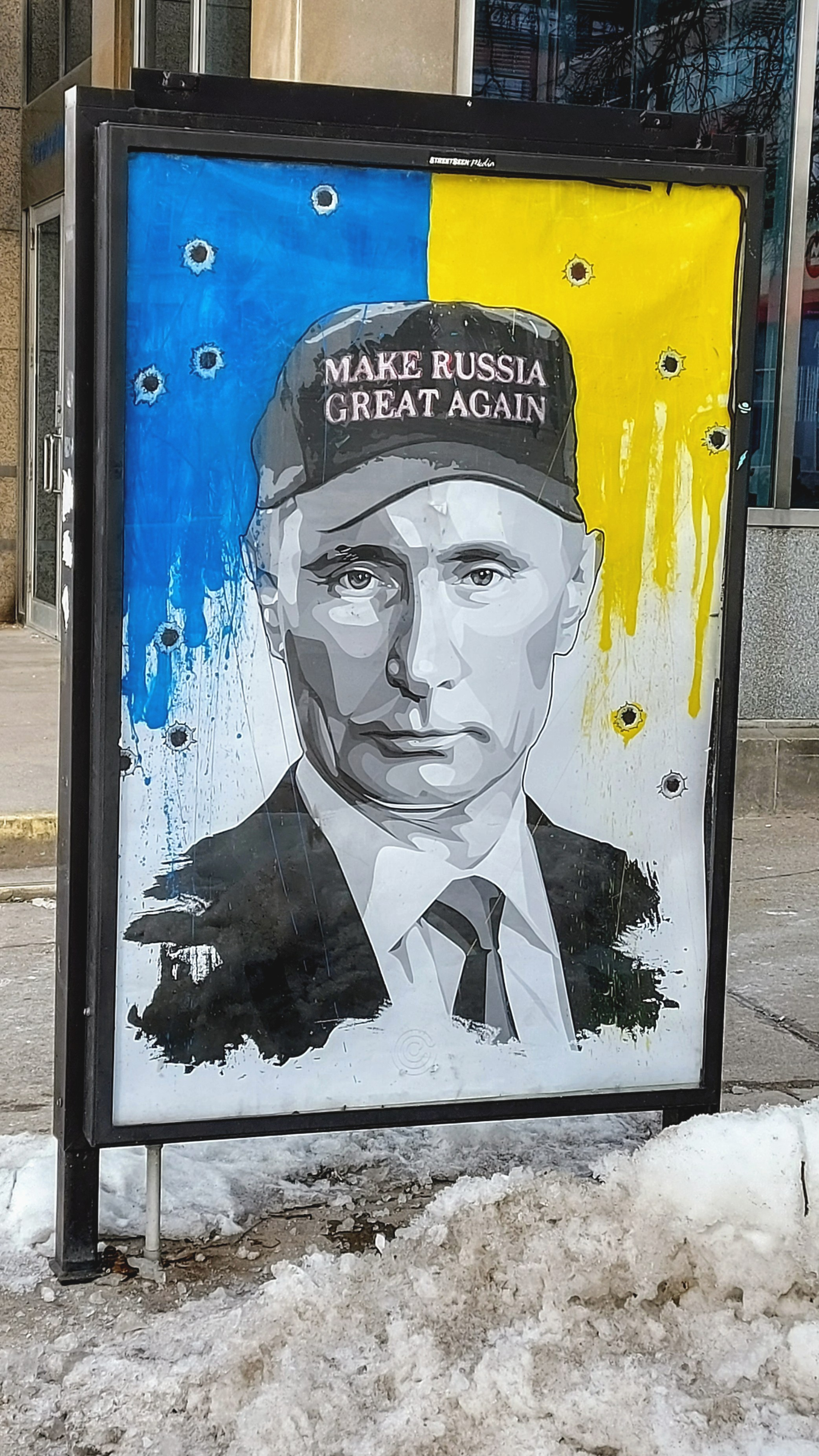

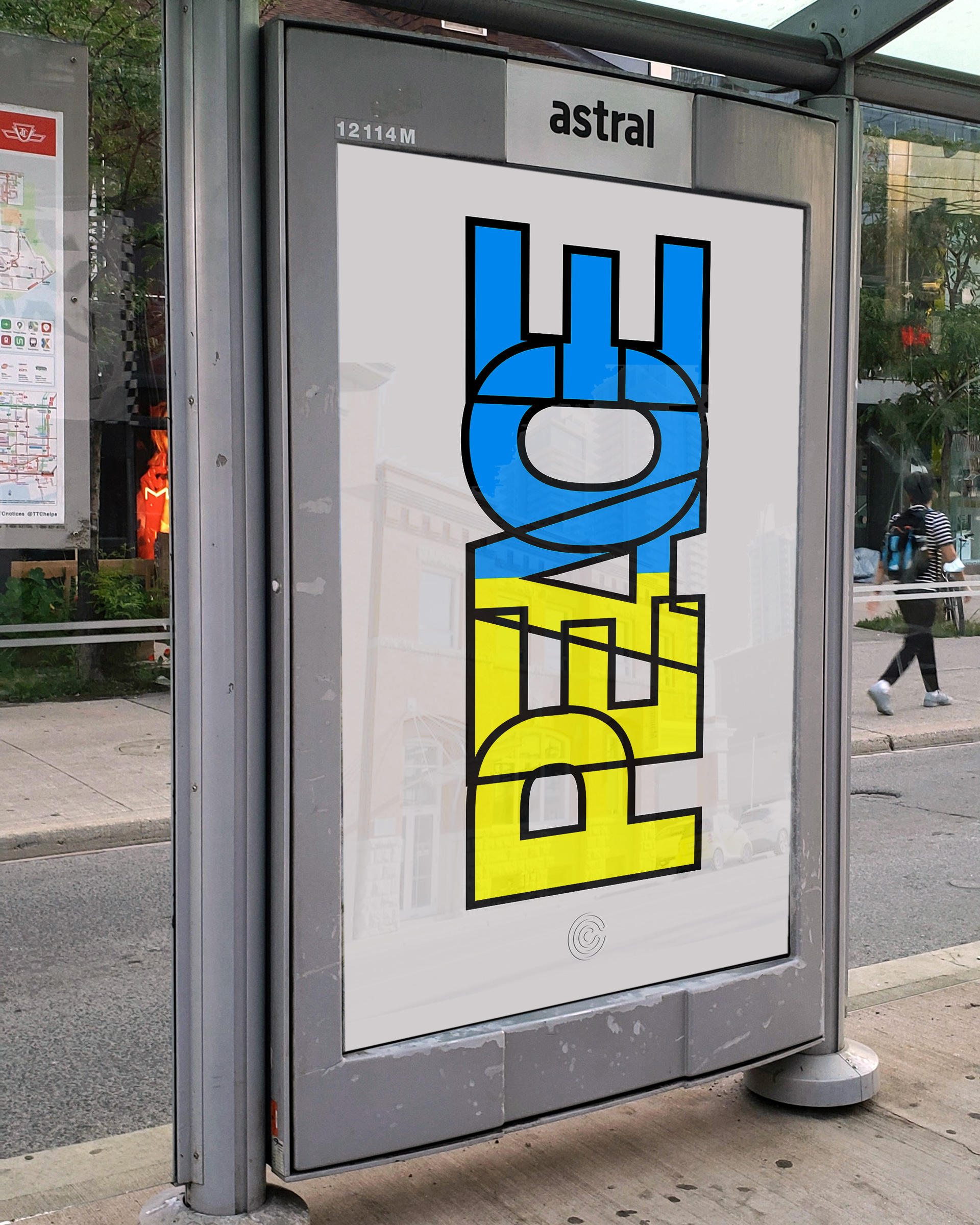

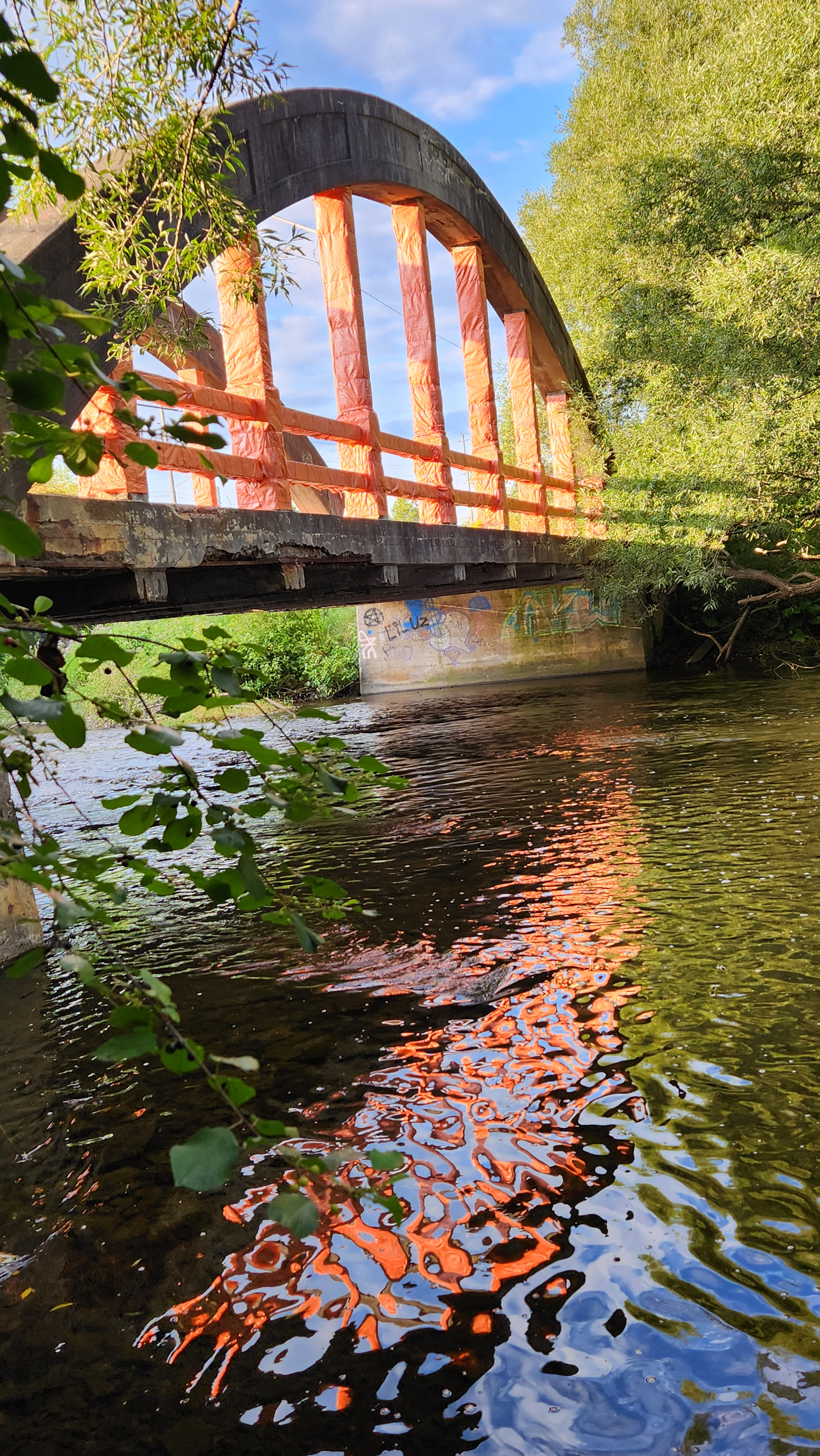

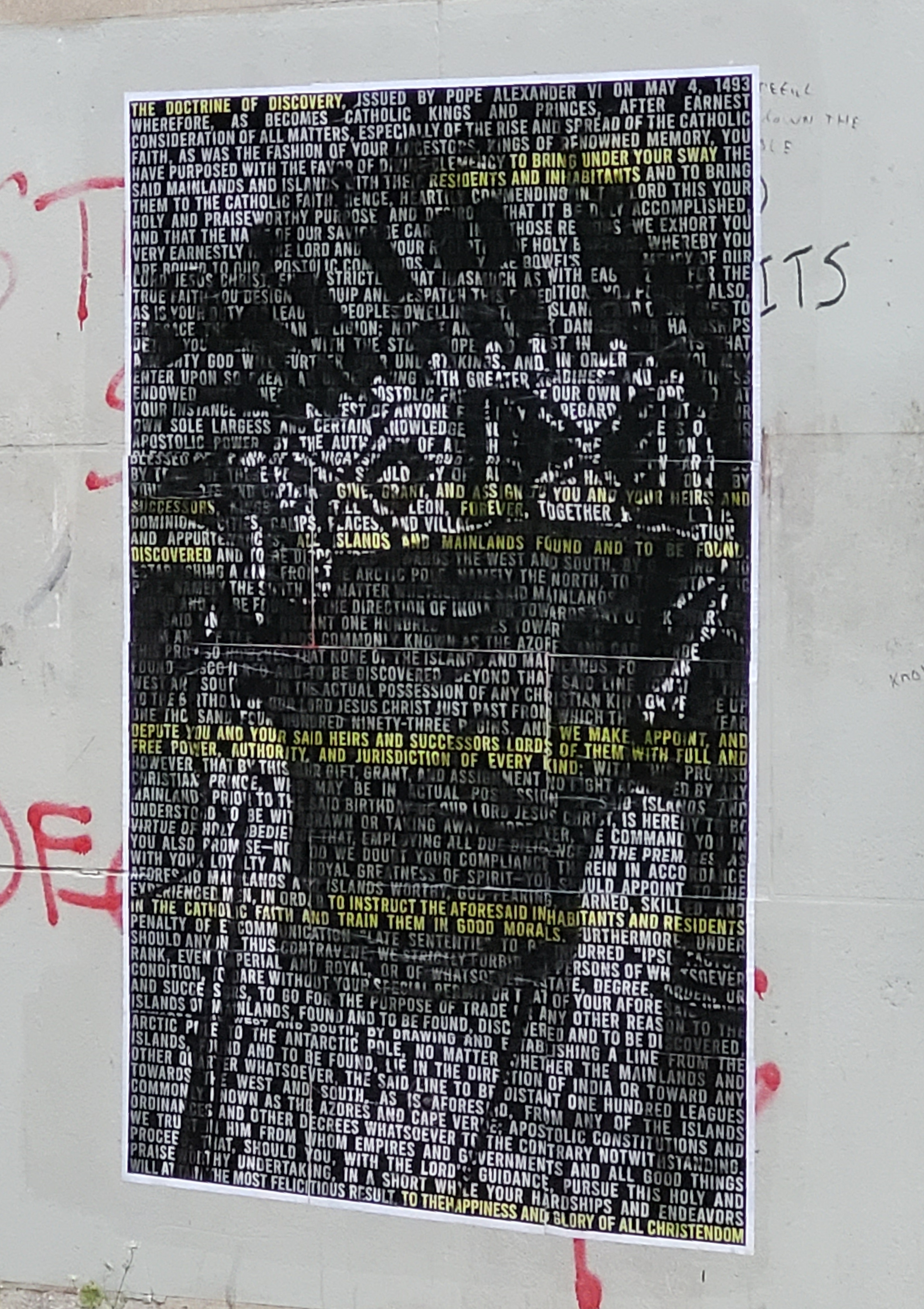

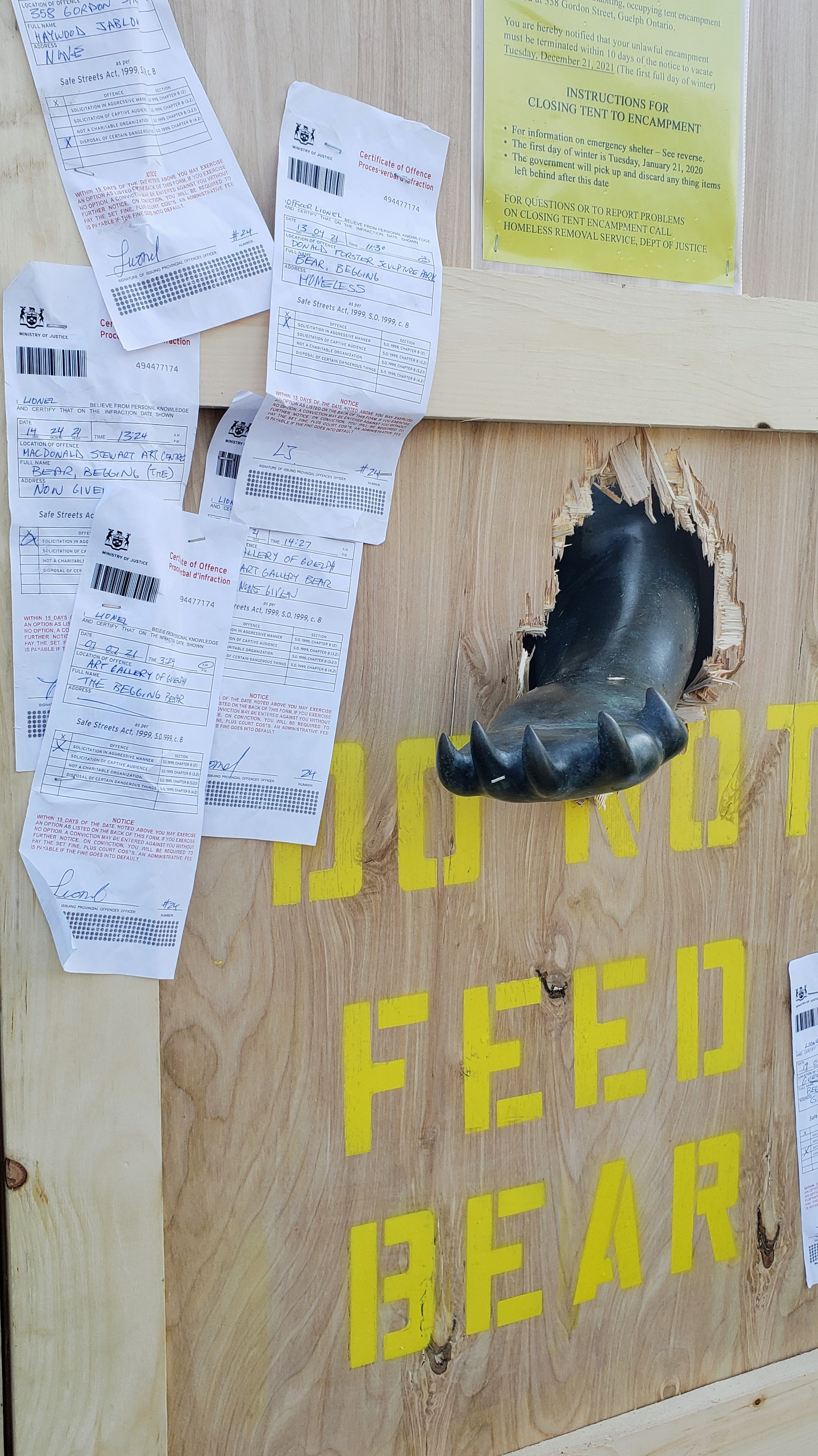
