= Mason's Hall (Richmond, Virginia) =

- Masons' Hall
- U.S. National Register of Historic Places
- Virginia Landmarks Register
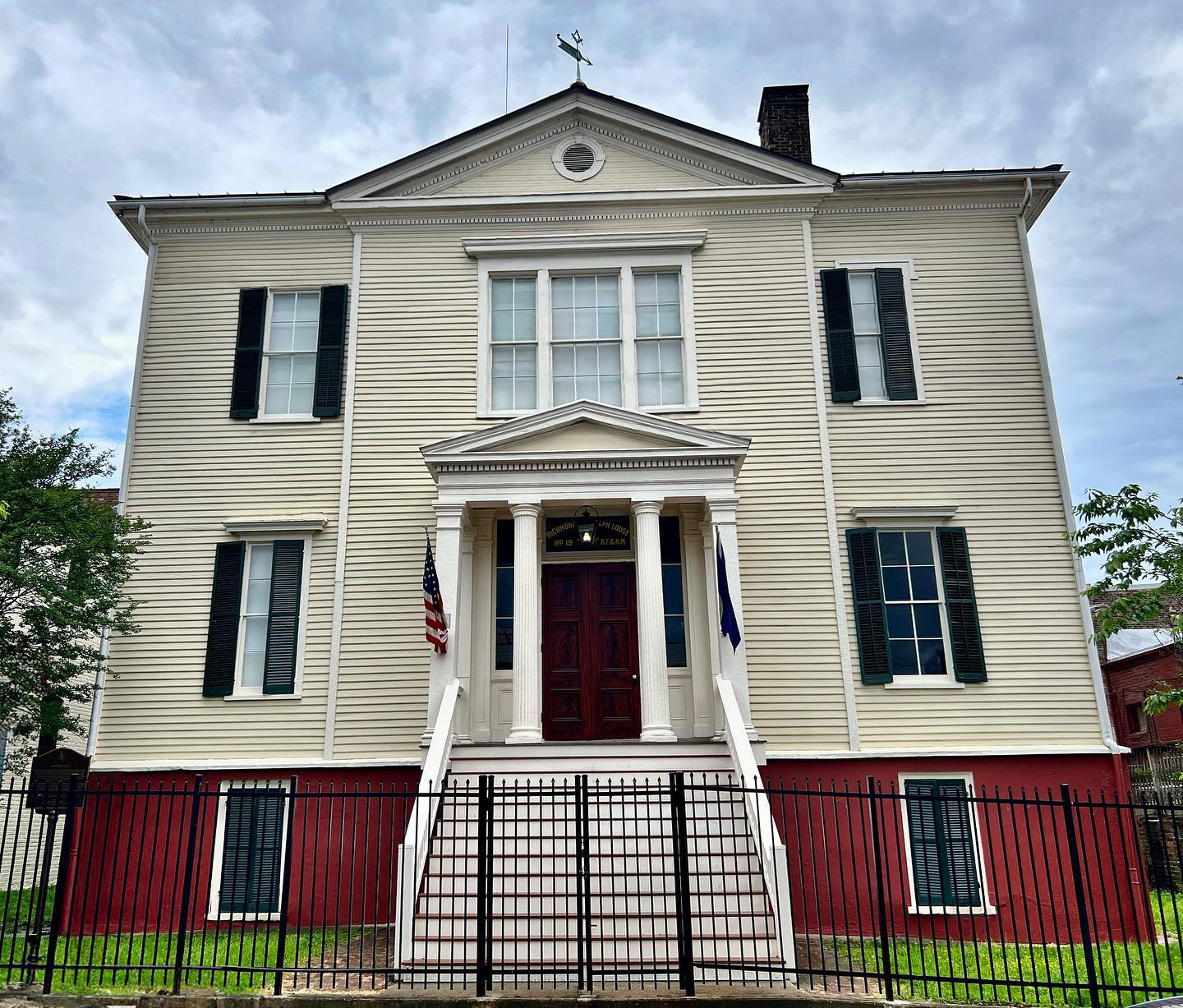
- Exterior of Masons' Hall

- Location within Virginia Location within the United States
- Location: 1807 E. Franklin St., Richmond, Virginia
- Coordinates: 37°31′59″N 77°25′36″W
- Area: 9.9 acres (4.0 ha)
- Built: 1785
- NRHP reference No.: 73002220
- VLR No.: 127-0019

Significant dates
- Added to NRHP: July 2, 1973
- Designated VLR: January 16, 1973

Masons' Hall, located in the Shockoe Bottom neighborhood of Richmond, Virginia was built during 1785 to 1787 by Richmond Lodge No. 13 (which in 1786 was renumbered Richmond Lodge No.10. and continues to exist). The building is still the active home of and owned by Richmond Randolph Lodge No.19 who have met in their third floor lodge room continuously since Masons’ Hall was completed in 1787. It was listed on the U.S. National Register of Historic Places in 1973.

== Construction History and Funding ==
The original plan to raise money for Masons’ Hall was a lottery, passed by an act of the Legislature December 27, 1785, permitting raising up to £ 1,500. The original fundraising committee consisted of John Marshall, Gabriel Galt, Foster Webb Jr., David Lambert, and John Beckley. This lottery was not successful though, and only sold a few tickets after one year.

About this time, many had abandoned hope of raising money by lottery. Those who had bought tickets were complaining, and the managers wanted to be relieved of the duty. As of April 13, 1787, it was resolved by the Common Hall that the “Society of Free Masons” would give security in the amount of £ 5,000 and a lodge committee was authorized to raise only £ 500. It is important to know that months prior, in January 1787, a disastrous fire had destroyed 30-40 houses in Richmond, and burned £ 130,000 worth of property. This was a time when money in Richmond was hard to come by.

At the time of the Richmond fire and the second fundraising attempt, it is believed that the building had not been raised above the first story but had been roofed over, and served as a Lodge room and public hall.

With the far less ambitious amount of £ 500 planned to be raised through the second lottery, a second floor made of wood (rather than brick as originally planned) was completed December 10, 1787, but left the lodge in debt. The Lodge had only raised £ 400 with the lottery, and on May 28, 1791 a builder named William Booker filed his bill in the County Court of Henrico asking the court to sell the building to pay him an owed balance of £ 247. This sum was paid though by Joseph Darmstadt and the suit was dismissed. This debt was gradually paid back and years of prosperity followed.

== Historic Status ==
At the time of its NRHP listing, it was the oldest Masonic building in the United States that was built as a Masonic meeting place and used continuously for that purpose, and one of few surviving buildings from the 18th century in Richmond. It was reportedly protected from fire by the command of a Union general, also a Mason, when the Union army occupied Richmond in 1865.

An early non-Masonic meeting held there provided instruction to Virginia's delegates to the U.S. Constitutional Convention.

The building has an octagonal cupola.

== Current Use ==
Masons' Hall continues to be used for masonic purposes and is the home of Richmond Randolph No. 19 Lodge.

== See also ==
- Masonic Temple (Richmond, Virginia), also NRHP-listed
