= Rombro Building =

- U.S. National Register of Historic Places
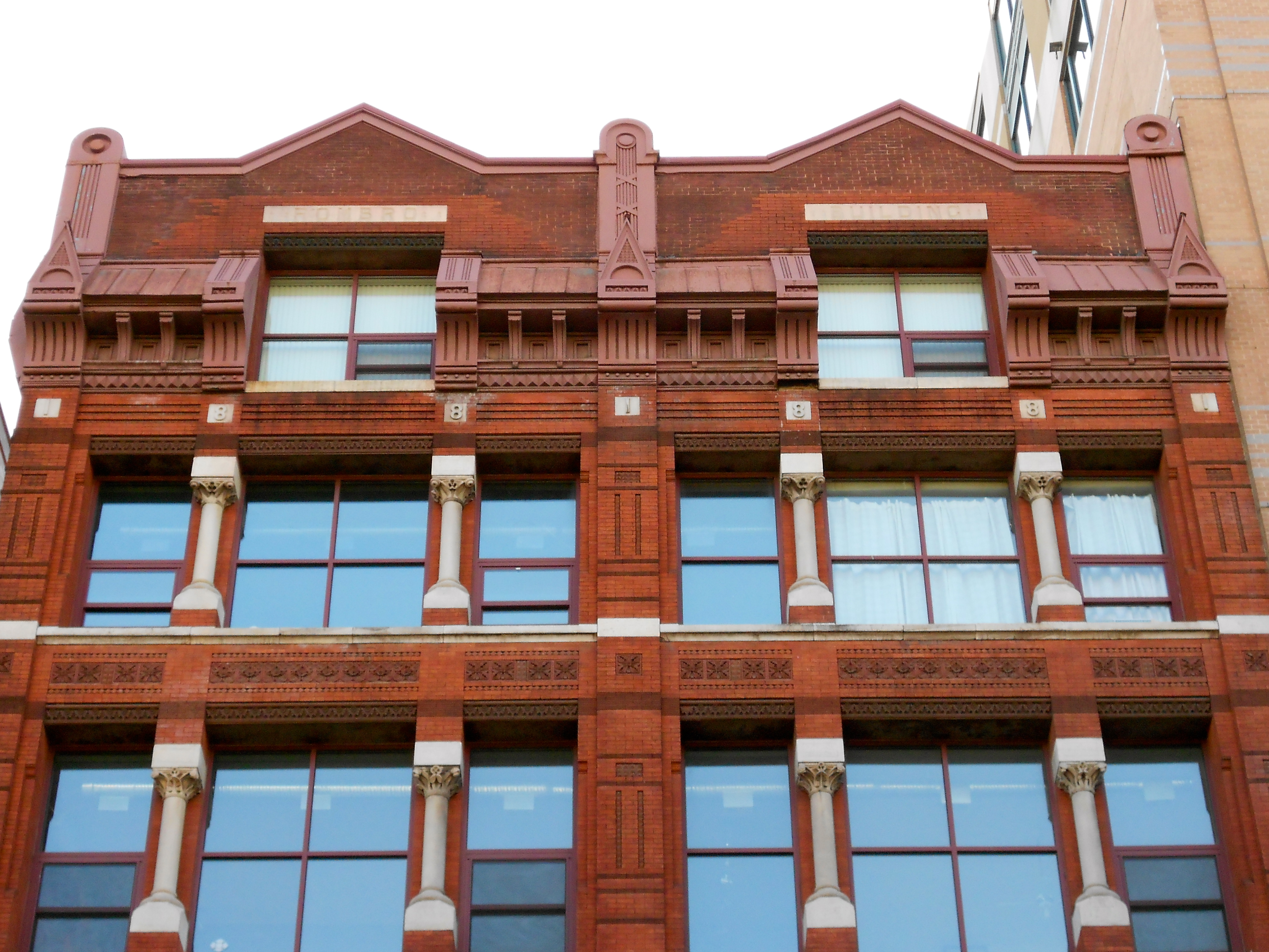
- Rombro Building, March 2012

- Location within Baltimore Location within Maryland Location within the United States
- Location: 22-24 S. Howard St., Baltimore, Maryland
- Coordinates: 39°17′17.7″N 76°37′10.5″W
- Area: less than one acre
- Built: 1881
- Architect: Jackson C. Gott
- Architectural style: Queen Anne
- MPS: Cast Iron Architecture of Baltimore MPS
- NRHP reference No.: 94001172
- Added to NRHP: May 26, 2005

Rombro Building is a historic loft building located at Baltimore, Maryland, United States. It is a six-story loft building constructed in 1881, and designed as a double warehouse. The first floor storefronts feature brick, stone, terra cotta, and cast iron framing and reflects the Queen Anne style in its facade organization and detailing.

Rombro Building was listed on the National Register of Historic Places in 1994.
