= James Lawrence Kernan =

American philanthropist (1838–1912)

James Lawrence Kernan (1838–1912) was a theater manager and philanthropist based in Baltimore, Maryland.

He was born in Baltimore, Maryland at the southeast corner of East Pratt and High streets, on July 29, 1838. He was educated at the old landmark buildings of Loyola High School and old Loyola College, then at North Calvert Street, between East Madison and Monument Streets, next to St. Ignatius Roman Catholic Church, in the Mount Vernon-Belvedere neighborhood, north of downtown. Later attending Mount St. Mary's College, in Frederick County's Emmitsburg campus.

After working initially in the dry goods business and as a clerk in the transportation department of the Baltimore & Ohio Railroad Company, he joined the Confederate States Army at the beginning of the Civil War. He was captured in October 1864, and held as a prisoner at the Union Army's prisoner-of-war camp at Point Lookout in St. Mary's County in southern Maryland at the confluence of the Potomac River and the Chesapeake Bay until the close of the war.

In February 1866, he founded the "Kernan Enterprises," a combination hotel and rathskeller. In 1903, he constructed one of the more elaborate hostelieries of the city, with the Hotel Kernan and adjacent Maryland Theater facing West Franklin Street, between North Paca and just west of North Howard Streets. Later renamed the Congress Hotel, the basement tavern and rathskeller was known as the Marble Bar and known even up to the 1980s for its cutting-edge music and nightclub. Placed in the late 19th-century theatre district of the city with the construction next door earlier in 1875 of the old luxurious Academy of Music facing North Howard and West Centre Streets and next to the old Auditorium Theater, which had replaced "The Natatorium", an indoor swimming pool and gymnasium establishment to the south and the first (1875) and second (1895) buildings of the Baltimore City College (high school) to the north, with the downtown urban campus further north of the new 1876 Johns Hopkins University along Howard Street, between Centre, Little Ross, Garden, and West Monument Streets. Replacing the old Auditorium Theatre in the 1920s was the grand movie palace of the Mayfair Theatre (still standing-2014) as later the grand beaux arts Stanley Theatre replaced in the 1920s the unfortunately razed Academy of Music, with it too succumbing to the wrecker's ball in 1965, in the Howard block between Franklin and Centre. By 2005, the old Congress Hotel, shorn of its matching Maryland Theatre to the west, was gutted and renovated with an appreciation of its historical architecture into condos and apartments by a locally well-known architect and construction company of Struever Brothers, Eccles and Rouse, one of their last projects before running into unexpected financial troubles after two decades of many Baltimore renovations and restoration projects.

During Kernan's lifetime, he founded a hospital between 1860 and 1866, later known as the James Lawrence Kernan Hospital located in the "Radnor Park" estate and renamed by the 2010s as the "University of Maryland Rehabilitation & Orthopaedic Institute" (part of the ever-growing University of Maryland Medical Center in downtown at West Lombard, South Greene and West Baltimore Streets) located in between the Forest Park neighborhood of northwest Baltimore and suburban Woodlawn in adjacent Baltimore County. Near the end of his life, he operated a Yiddish theater in the elaborate red-brick industrial building now known as the Hendler Creamery (a locally-famous ice cream and dairy manufacturing company) on East Baltimore Street (northeast corner, between East and Aisquith Streets) in the Jonestown/Old Town neighborhood, east of the Jones Falls, then the center of the old Jewish area of Baltimore from the 1840s to World War II. He died at his Hotel Kernan in 1912.
