= Demolition by neglect =

Allowing buildings to deteriorate, later requiring demolition

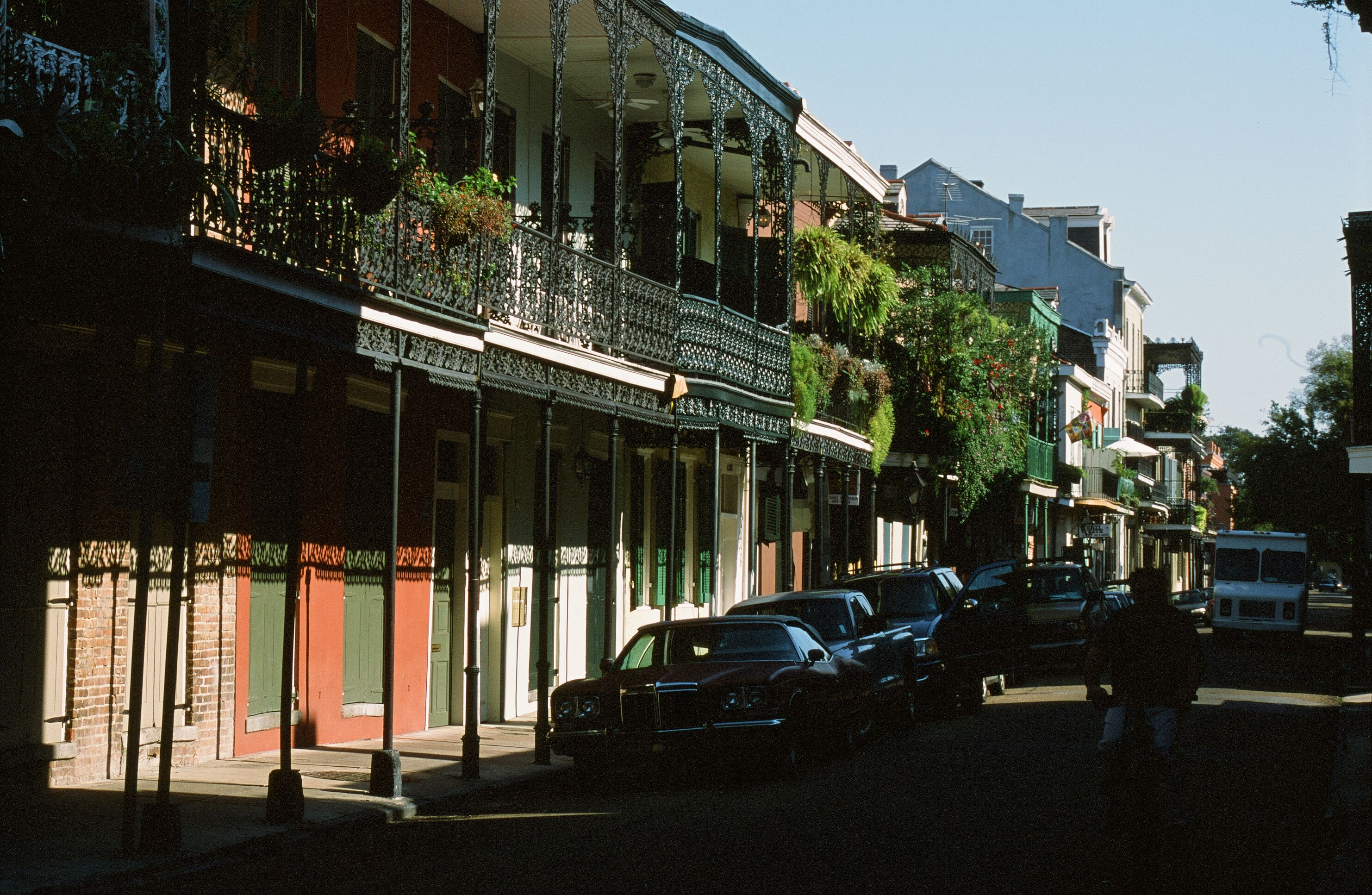
In order to combat demolition by neglect, New Orleans has enacted ordinances that require the structural maintenance of French Quarter structures under threat of criminal penalty

Demolition by neglect refers to the practice of allowing a building to deteriorate to the point that demolition becomes necessary or restoration becomes unreasonable. The practice has been used by property owners as a means of sidestepping historic preservation laws by providing justification for the demolition of historical buildings. In order to prevent demolition by neglect, a number of cities have adopted ordinances requiring property owners to properly maintain historical buildings.

== Challenges in enforcement ==
Enforcing anti-neglect ordinances poses challenges.

== Example cases ==
- DBN featured in Eastern Female High School and the Hendler Creamery building in Baltimore, USA.
- Hotel Yugoslavia, Belgrade: This landmark faced potential demolition due to prolonged neglect, sparking public opposition and debates over heritage preservation.
- India Buildings, Glasgow: After years of neglect, this historic structure was demolished, raising concerns about the loss of architectural heritage and the effectiveness of preservation laws.
- Harborplace in Baltimore, Maryland: This iconic festival marketplace, once the crown jewel of The Rouse Company's urban renewal projects, suffered from numerous problems from Ashkenazy Acquisition Corporation's lack of maintenance, such as failed HVAC, mold build-up, rodent infestations, non-functional escalators, and a broken fire sprinkler system following a fire that occurred in the Light Street Pavilion's Ripley's Believe It or Not! museum in April 2017. It was bad enough that the pavilions were placed on receivership in 2019 and were announced for demolition in 2023. Harborplace will officially close its doors as a festival marketplace and will be razed in the fall of 2026.

== Preventive measures ==
To prevent demolition by neglect, communities can implement strategies such as regular inspections to identify early signs of neglect, financial incentives like grants and tax credits to support maintenance, and public awareness programs to educate about the importance of preservation. Proactive measures help municipalities protect cultural and historical assets effectively.

== Artistic interventions ==
In 2024, the anonymous street artist Lionel created an installation titled "Demolition by Neglect" on Guelph’s historic McQuillan Bridge. By wrapping the bridge in orange material, Lionel highlighted its deteriorating state and drew public attention to issues of cultural heritage preservation. This intervention spurred community discussions on the maintenance of historic structures and led to a swift response from local authorities, who addressed concerns about the bridge’s condition.
