= Johnston Building (Baltimore, Maryland) =

Historic building in Maryland, USA

- U.S. National Register of Historic Places
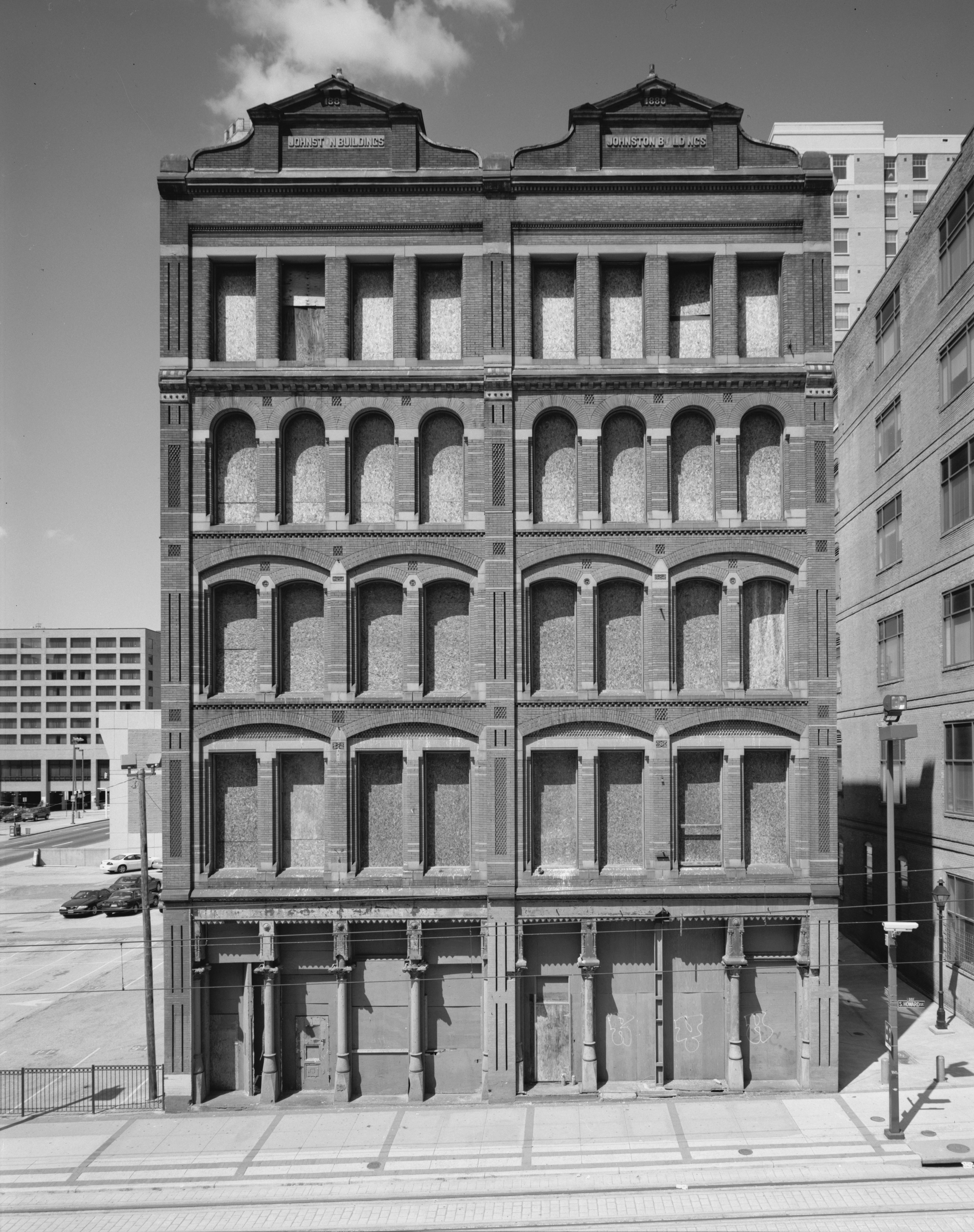
- Johnston Building, HABS Photo

- Location within Baltimore Location within Maryland Location within the United States
- Location: 26-30 S. Howard St., Baltimore, Maryland
- Coordinates: 39°17′17″N 76°37′11″W
- Area: less than one acre
- Built: 1880
- Architect: Jackson C. Gott
- Architectural style: Queen Anne
- MPS: Cast Iron Architecture of Baltimore MPS
- NRHP reference No.: 94001166
- Added to NRHP: September 26, 1994

Johnston Building was a historic wholesale building located at Baltimore, Maryland, United States designed by Jackson C. Gott. It is a five-story loft building constructed in 1880. The cast iron façade reflected the influence of the Queen Anne style. It housed wholesale companies dealing in tobacco, hats, shoes, clothing, and home and office furnishings, including Samuel Hecht, Jr. & Sons. It was demolished in 2002.

Johnston Building was listed on the National Register of Historic Places in 1994.
