= Union Bridge Historic District =

Historic district in Maryland, United States

- U.S. National Register of Historic Places
- U.S. Historic district
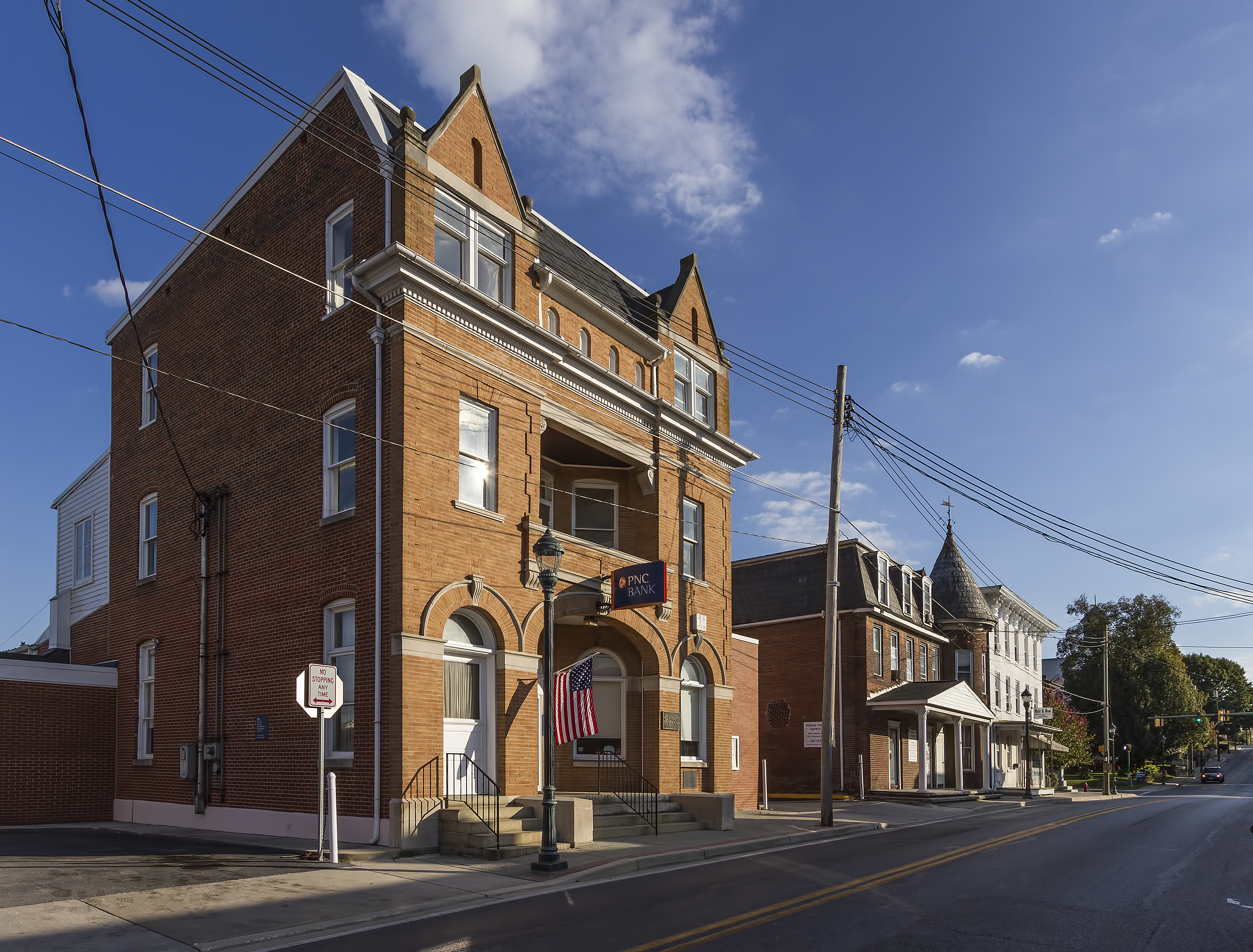

- Location within Maryland Location within the United States
- Location: Roughly bounded by Bellevue, E. Locust, Buttersburg Alley, Church, Whyte, W. Locust and the Western Maryland RR tracks, Union Bridge, Maryland
- Coordinates: 39°34′3″N 77°10′40″W
- Area: 100 acres (40 ha)
- Built: 1861
- Architect: Wolfe, Joseph; Gott, Jackson, et al.
- Architectural style: Late Victorian, Late 19th And 20th Century Revivals, Late 19th And Early 20th Century American Movements
- NRHP reference No.: 94000820
- Added to NRHP: August 17, 1994

Union Bridge Historic District is a national historic district at Union Bridge, Carroll County, Maryland, United States. The district consists of this small piedmont village, which serves the area as a market center for the surrounding agricultural area. The greatest growth occurred in the 1880s after the Western Maryland Railway built its shops here.

It was added to the National Register of Historic Places in 1994.

== See also ==
- Union Bridge Station - Historic railway station
