= University of Maryland Rehabilitation & Orthopaedic Institute =

- University of Maryland Medical System
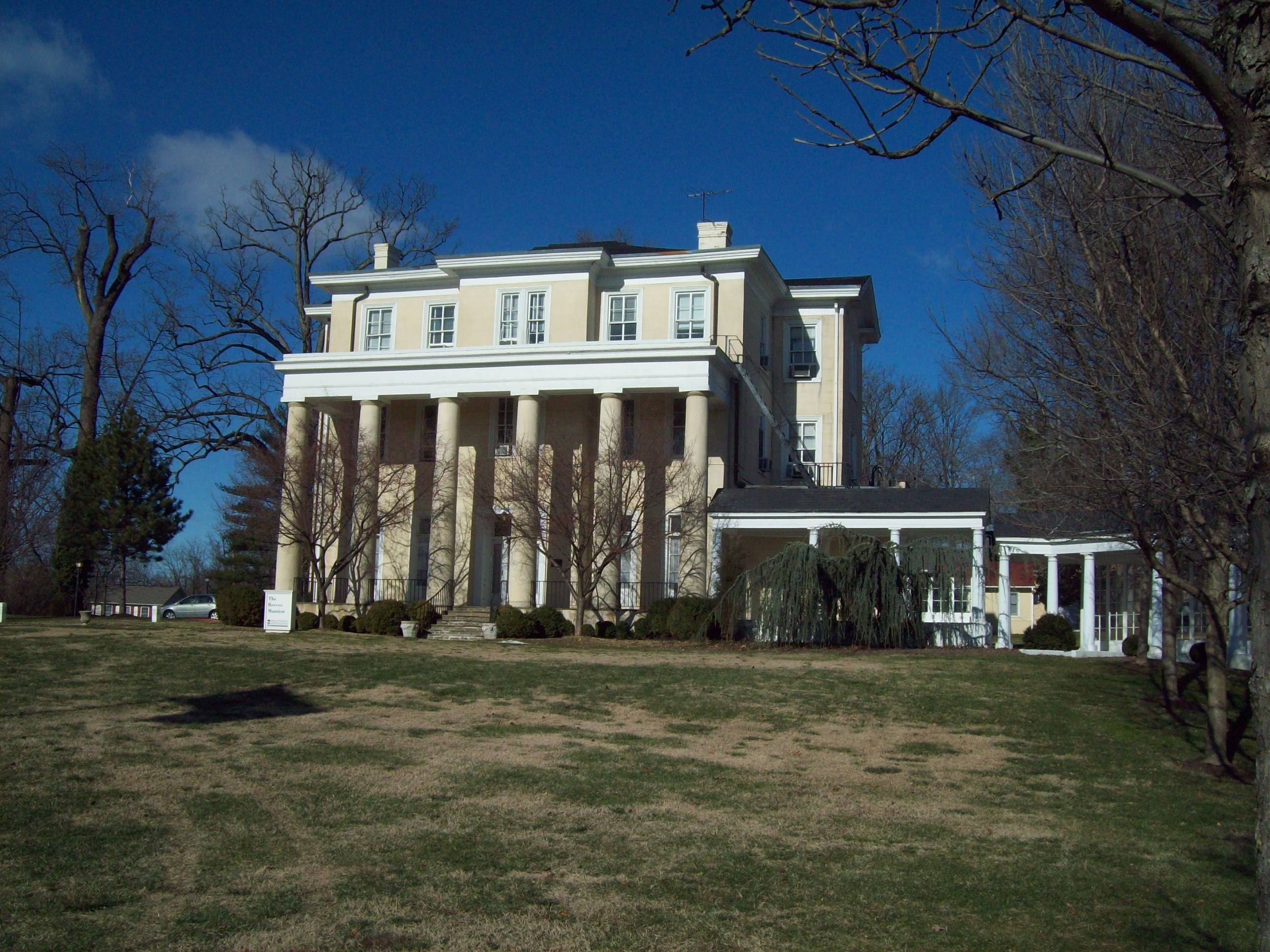

Geography
- Location: 2200 Kernan Drive, Baltimore, MD

Organisation
- Type: Rehabilitation, Outpatient

Links
- Website: http://www.umrehabortho.org/
- James Lawrence Kernan Hospital
- U.S. National Register of Historic Places
- Baltimore City Landmark
- Coordinates: 39°18′48″N 76°42′34″W
- Area: 50 acres (20 ha)
- Built: 1863
- Architectural style: Greek Revival and Colonial Revival architecture
- NRHP reference No.: 79003275

Significant dates
- Added to NRHP: September 24, 1979
- Designated BCL: 1982

University of Maryland Rehabilitation & Orthopaedic Institute is a rehabilitation hospital located along the border of the Forest Park neighborhood of northwest Baltimore City and Woodlawn in Maryland. It lies on and is incorporated into the historic hospital building and grounds of the former James Lawrence Kernan Hospital. The hospital is now part of the University of Maryland Medical System, on the campus of the University of Maryland at Baltimore.

== History ==
The James Lawrence Kernan Hospital was built between 1860 and 1867 as Radnor Park, a two-story, five-bay, Victorian mansion. In the first decades of the 20th century, alterations were carried out to the original house which made the house over into a combination of the Greek Revival and Colonial Revival styles. The additional surrounding 1920s-era hospital structures were built in a style that blends well with the old historic mansion and its grounds. The facility was significantly expanded in the 21st century with new buildings, parking lots, driveways.

James Lawrence Kernan (1838–1912), was a theater manager and philanthropist of the late Victorian and early Edwardian eras in Baltimore. He had the landmark Kernan Hotel (later renamed the Congress Hotel) on West Franklin Street. The "rathskeller" in the basement of the hotel (later also known as the "marble bar") was the site of the first "jazz band" music in the town when it opened in 1903.

It was listed on the National Register of Historic Places maintained by the National Park Service of the U.S. Department of the Interior in 1979.

== Notable patients ==
- CBS television news reporter/correspondent Kimberly Dozier, following her injuries from an improvised explosive device in the Iraq War in 2006, spent time at Kernan recovering.
- Several former Baltimore Colts football players, including quarterback Johnny Unitas, were recipients of physical therapy at Kernan Hospital.
