= Loyola-Notre Dame, Baltimore =

Neighborhood in Baltimore

Coordinates: 39.35149°N 76.6161°W

Loyola-Notre Dame
- Neighborhood of Baltimore
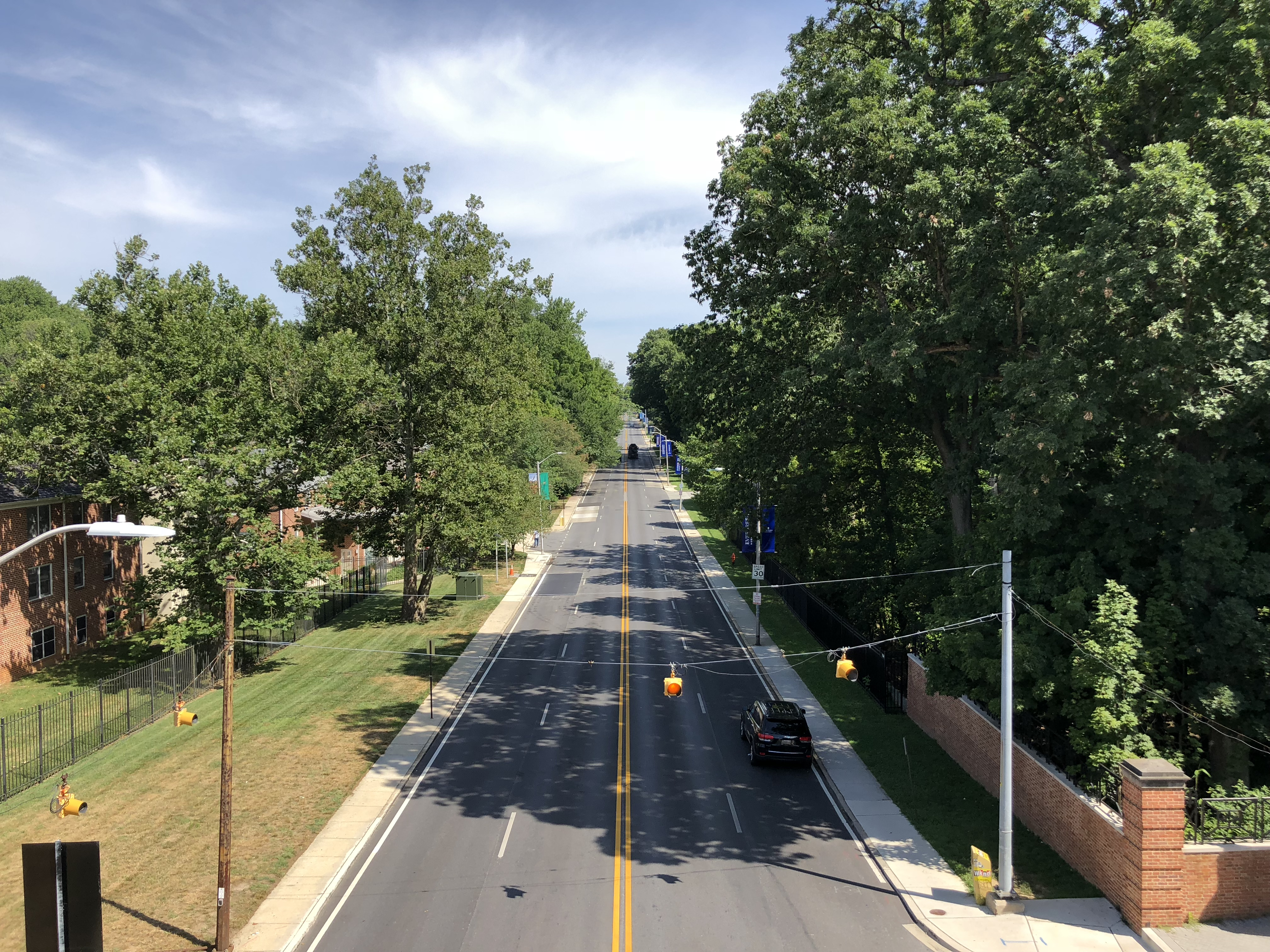
- View from pedestrian bridge over Charles Street near Cold Spring Lane in the Loyola-Notre Dame neighborhood, Baltimore

- Location within Baltimore Location within Maryland Location within the United States
- Country: United States
- State: Maryland
- City: Baltimore
- Time zone: UTC−5 (Eastern)
  - Summer (DST): UTC−4 (EDT)
- Area Codes: 410, 443, 667

Loyola-Notre Dame is a neighborhood located in Baltimore, Maryland. The neighborhood is named after the two universities that occupy most of the area: Notre Dame of Maryland University and Loyola University Maryland. The neighborhood is also home to the Evergreen House owned by Johns Hopkins University. The neighborhood covers all the area owned by the two universities and Evergreen House. The neighborhood does not cover a uniform area, but does have a relative definition. The northern boundary is Homeland Avenue. The eastern boundary varies among Millbrook Road, Underwood Road and other small streets. The Radnor Village, Thomas Aquinas Hall, and Loyola Public system are also included in the neighborhood despite being separated from the rest of the Loyola campus by the Radnor-Winston and Villages of Homeland neighborhoods. The southern border is Cold Spring Lane and the western border is primarily North Charles Street. Loyola extends via a pedestrian bridge over North Charles Street along Cold Spring Lane to Stony Run stream. The Loyola Fitness and Aquatics center is also across North Charles Street. The neighborhood is unique in having a very small permanent population, but housing over 4,000 students.
