= List of Baltimore neighborhoods =

This list of Baltimore neighborhoods includes the neighborhoods of Baltimore, Maryland, divided into nine geographical regions: North, Northeast, East, Southeast, South, Southwest, West, Northwest, and Central. Each district is patrolled by a respective precinct of the Baltimore Police Department.

Charles Street down to Hanover Street and Ritchie Highway serve as the east-west dividing line and Eastern Avenue to Route 40 as the north-south dividing line. Baltimore Street is the north-south dividing line for the U.S. Postal Service. It is not uncommon for locals to divide the city simply by East or West Baltimore, using Charles Street or I-83 as a dividing line.

The following is a list of major neighborhoods in Baltimore, organized by broad geographical location in the city:

== Neighborhoods ==
A list of the neighborhoods of Baltimore listed by planning district:

=== Northwest ===
- Arlington
- Callaway-Garrison, Baltimore
- Central Park Heights
- Cheswolde
- Coldspring
- Cross Country
- Cylburn
- Fallstaff
- Glen
- Gwynn Oak, Baltimore
- Greenspring
- Langston Hughes
- Levindale
- Lucille Park
- Mount Washington
- Park Circle
- Parklane
- Pimlico Good Neighbors
- Reisterstown Station/ Pikesville
- Seton Business Park, Baltimore
- Towanda-Grantley
- Woodmere

=== North ===
- Abell
- Barclay
- Bellona-Gittings
- Belvedere
- Better Waverly
- Blythewood
- Cameron Village
- Cedarcroft
- Charles North
- Charles Village (formerly Peabody Heights)
- Chinquapin Park, Baltimore
- Cross Keys
- Ednor Gardens-Lakeside
- Evergreen
- Evesham Park
- Glen Oaks
- Greenmount West
- Guilford
- Hampden
- Harwood
- Hoes Heights
- Homeland
- Idlewood
- Johns Hopkins Homewood
- Jones Falls Area
- Kenilworth Park
- Kernewood
- Keswick
- Lake Evesham
- Lake Walker
- Loyola/Notre Dame
- Mid-Govans
- New Northwood
- North Roland Park/Poplar Hill
- Oakenshawe
- Old Goucher
- The Orchards
- Original Northwood
- Pen Lucy
- Radnor-Winston
- Remington
- Richnor Springs
- Roland Park
- Rosebank
- Sabina-Mattfeldt
- Tuscany-Canterbury
- Villages at Homeland
- Waverly
- Wilson Park
- Winston-Govans
- Woodberry
- Woodbourne Heights
- Woodbourne-McCabe
- Wrenlane
- Wyman Park
- Wyndhurst
- York-Homeland

=== Northeast ===
- Arcadia
- Armistead Gardens
- Belair-Edison
- Belair-Parkside
- Beverly Hills
- Broening Manor
- Cedmont
- Cedonia
- Clifton Park
- Coldstream-Homestead-Montebello
- Eastwood
- Four By Four
- Frankford
- Glenham-Belhar
- Graceland Park
- Hamilton Hills
- Herring Run
- Hillen
- Holabird Industrial Park
- Lauraville
- Loch Raven
- Lower Herring Run Park
- Mayfield
- Medford
- Montebello
- Moravia-Walther
- Morgan Park
- Morgan State University
- Mt Pleasant Park
- North Harford Road
- Orangeville
- Orangeville Industrial Area
- Orchard Ridge
- Overlea
- Perring Loch
- Pulaski Industrial Area
- Ramblewood
- Rosemont East
- Saint Helena
- Stonewood-Pentwood-Winston
- Taylor Heights
- Waltherson
- Westfield

=== East and Downtown ===
East Midway

- Berea
- Biddle Street
- Broadway East
- Butcher's Hill
- CARE
- Darley Park
- Downtown
- Downtown West
- Dundalk Marine Terminal
- East Baltimore Midway
- Ellwood Park/Monument
- Greenmount Cemetery
- Inner Harbor
- Johnston Square
- Madison-Eastend
- McElderry Park
- Milton-Montford
- Oliver
- South Clifton Park
- University of Maryland

=== Central ===
- Mid-Town Belvedere
- Mount Vernon
- Seton Hill

=== Southeast ===
- Baltimore Highlands
- Bayview
- Brewer's Hill
- Canton
- Canton Industrial Area
- Dunbar-Broadway
- Fells Point
- Gay Street
- Greektown
- Highlandtown
- Jonestown
- Kresson
- Little Italy
- Middle East
- O'Donnell Heights
- Oldtown
- Patterson Park Neighborhood
- Patterson Place
- Penn-Fallsway
- Perkins Homes
- Pleasant View Gardens
- Upper Fells Point
- Washington Hill

=== South ===
South Baltimore

- Barre Circle
- Brooklyn
- Carroll Park
- Carroll-Camden Industrial Area
- Cherry Hill
- Curtis Bay
- Curtis Bay Industrial Area
- Fairfield Area / (former Masonville & Wagner's Point - East Brooklyn)
- Federal Hill
- Franklin Square
- Hawkins Point / Arundel Cove
- Hollins Market
- Lakeland
- Locust Point
- Locust Point (North & South) Industrial Area
- Middle Branch / Broening / Reedbird Parks
- Mount Winans
- New Southwest/Mount Clare
- Otterbein
- Poppleton
- Port Covington
- Ridgely's Delight
- Riverside
- Saint Paul
- Sharp-Leadenhall
- South Baltimore
- Spring Garden Industrial Area
- Stadiums Area / Camden Yards sports complex
- Union Square
- Westport

=== Southwest ===
- Allendale
- Beechfield
- Boyd-Booth
- Carroll-South Hilton
- Carrollton Ridge
- Dickeyville
- Edgewood
- Edmondson Village
- Franklintown
- Gwynns Falls
- Gwynns Falls/Leakin Park
- Hunting Ridge
- Irvington
- Lower Edmondson Village
- Millhill
- Morrell Park
- Oaklee
- Penrose/Fayette Street Outreach
- Rognel Heights
- Saint Agnes
- Saint Josephs
- Shipley Hill
- Ten Hills
- Tremont
- Uplands
- Violetville
- Wakefield
- Washington Village/Pigtown
- West Hills
- Westgate
- Wilhelm Park
- Yale-Heights

=== West ===
West Baltimore

- Ashburton
- Bolton Hill
- Bridgeview-Greenlawn
- Burleith-Leighton
- Central Forest Park
- Concerned Citizens of Forest Park
- Coppin Heights/Ash-Co-East
- Dolfield
- Dorchester
- Druid Heights
- Druid Hill Park
- East Arlington
- Easterwood
- Evergreen Lawn
- Fairmont
- Forest Park
- Forest Park Golf Course
- Franklintown Road
- Garwyn Oaks
- Grove Park
- Hanlon Longwood
- Harlem Park
- Heritage Crossing
- Howard Park
- Liberty Square
- Madison Park
- Midtown-Edmondson
- Mondawmin
- Mosher
- Mount Holly
- Northwest Community Action
- Panway/Braddish Avenue
- Parkview/Woodbrook
- Penn North
- Purnell
- Reservoir Hill
- Rosemont
- Rosemont Homeowners/Tenants
- Sandtown-Winchester
- Upton
- Walbrook
- West Arlington
- West Forest Park
- Winchester
- Windsor Hills

== See also ==
- Chinatown in Baltimore
