= Orchard Ridge =

Orchard Ridge may refer to:

- The Orchard Ridge Campus of Oakland Community College in Farmington Hills, Michigan, USA
- Orchard Ridge, Baltimore, a residential neighborhood in northeastern Baltimore, Maryland, USA, formerly known as Claremont-Freedom
