= Wilhelm Park, Baltimore =

Neighborhood in Baltimore

Wilhelm Park
- Neighborhood of Baltimore
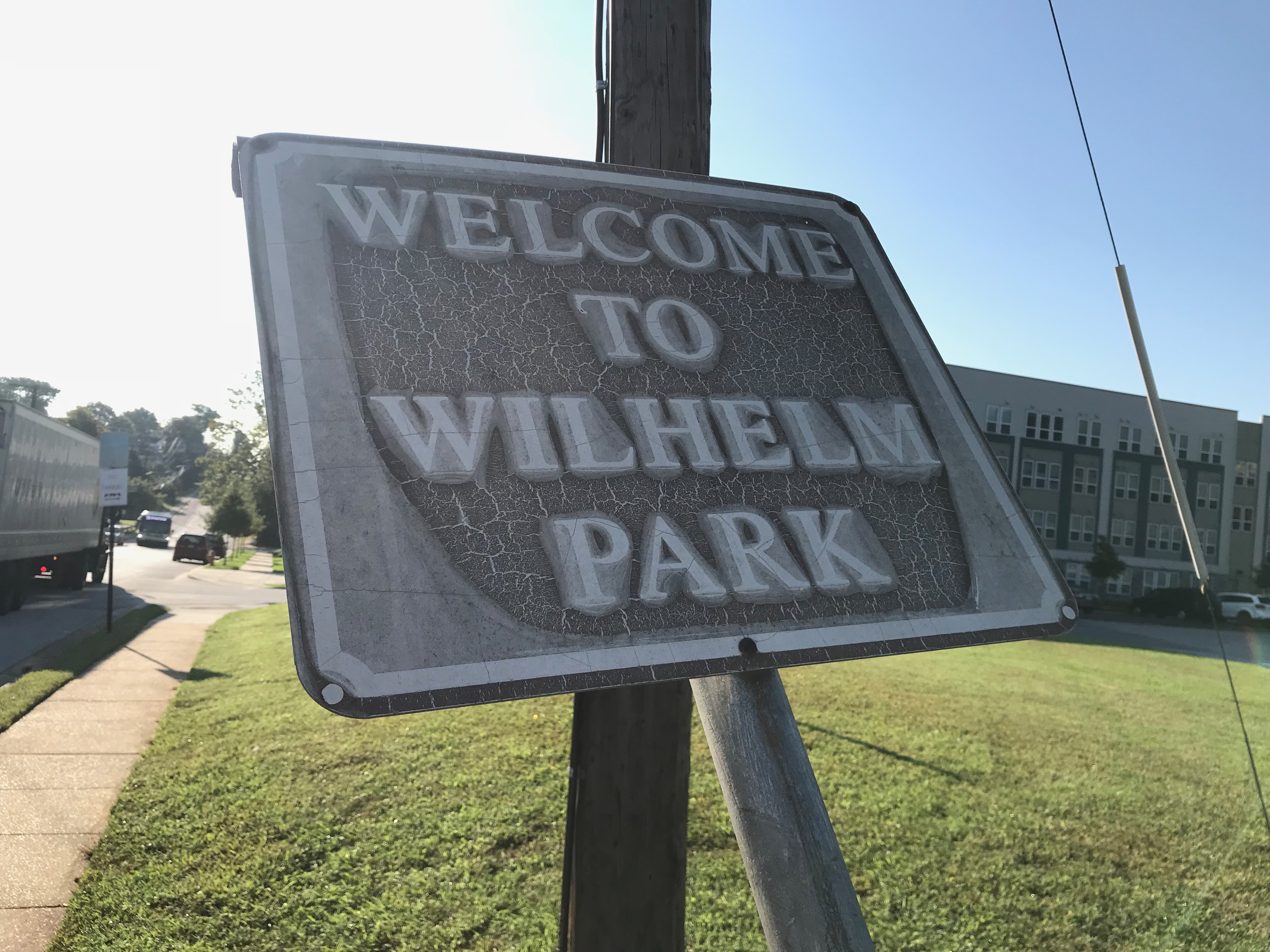
- Sign for Wilhem Park, Baltimore at intersection of Wilkens Avenue and Desoto Road

- Location within Baltimore Location within Maryland Location within the United States
- Coordinates: 39°16′24″N 76°39′51″W
- Country: United States
- State: Maryland
- City: Baltimore
- Time zone: UTC−5 (Eastern)
  - Summer (DST): UTC−4 (EDT)
- Area Codes: 410, 443, 667

Wilhelm Park is a neighborhood in southwest Baltimore, Maryland.
