= Downtown West, Baltimore =

Neighborhood in Baltimore

Downtown West
- Neighborhood of Baltimore
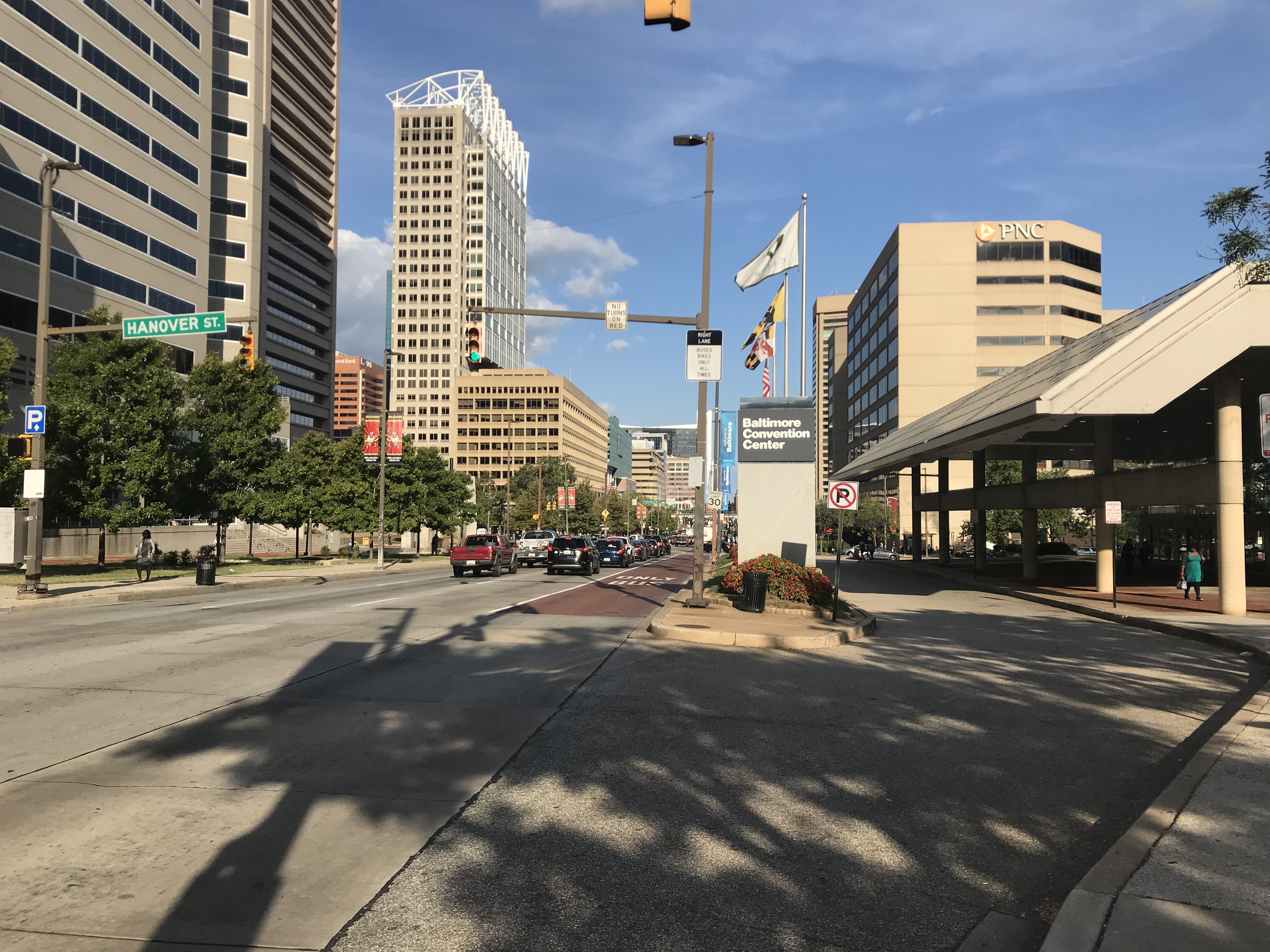
- Baltimore Convention Center at corner of W. Pratt Street and Hanover Street in Downtown West, Baltimore

- Location within Baltimore Location within Maryland Location within the United States
- Coordinates: 39.293°N 76.646°W
- Country: United States
- State: Maryland
- City: Baltimore
- Time zone: UTC−5 (Eastern)
  - Summer (DST): UTC−4 (EDT)
- Area Codes: 410, 443, 667

Downtown West is a neighborhood comprising a southwestern portion of downtown Baltimore, Maryland.
