= Fairmont, Baltimore =

Neighborhood in Baltimore

Fairmont
- Neighborhood of Baltimore
- Interactive map of Fairmont
- Country: United States
- State: Maryland
- City: Baltimore
- Time zone: Eastern
  - Summer (DST): EDT
- ZIP codes: 21224
- Area code(s): 410, 443, 667

Fairmont is a neighborhood located in the western part of Baltimore, Maryland, United States. It is part of the city’s West planning districts.

== Geography ==
Fairmont is a small residential neighborhood situated in West Baltimore. According to the Baltimore City Department of Planning, it falls within the city’s Neighborhood Statistical Areas system. The community is described as being characterized by single-family detached homes and tree-lined streets, distinguishing it from the denser row-house neighborhoods nearby. The size of Fairmont is 0.167 square miles (0.43 km^{2}).

== See also ==
- List of Baltimore neighborhoods
