= Locust Point Industrial Area, Baltimore =

Neighborhood in Baltimore

Locust Point Industrial Area
- Neighborhood of Baltimore
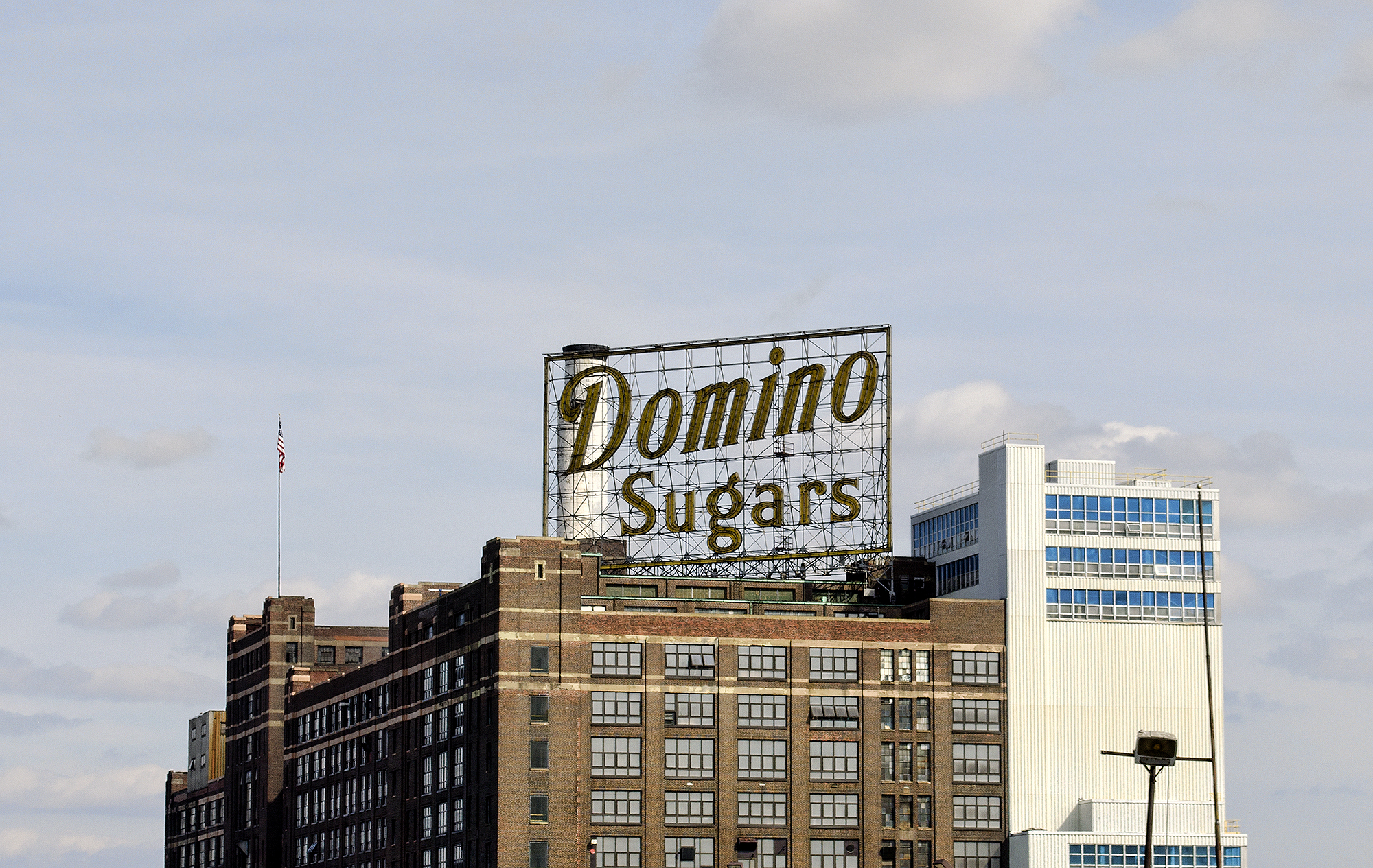
- Domino Sugar plant at 1100 Key Highway in Locust Point Industrial Area, Baltimore

- Location within Baltimore Location within Maryland Location within the United States
- Coordinates: 39.2690°N 76.5887°W
- Country: United States
- State: Maryland
- City: Baltimore
- Time zone: UTC−5 (Eastern)
  - Summer (DST): UTC−4 (EDT)
- Area Codes: 410, 443, 667

Locust Point Industrial Area is a neighborhood in south Baltimore, Maryland.
