= Sharp-Leadenhall, Baltimore =

Neighborhood in Baltimore

Sharp-Leadenhall
- Neighborhood of Baltimore
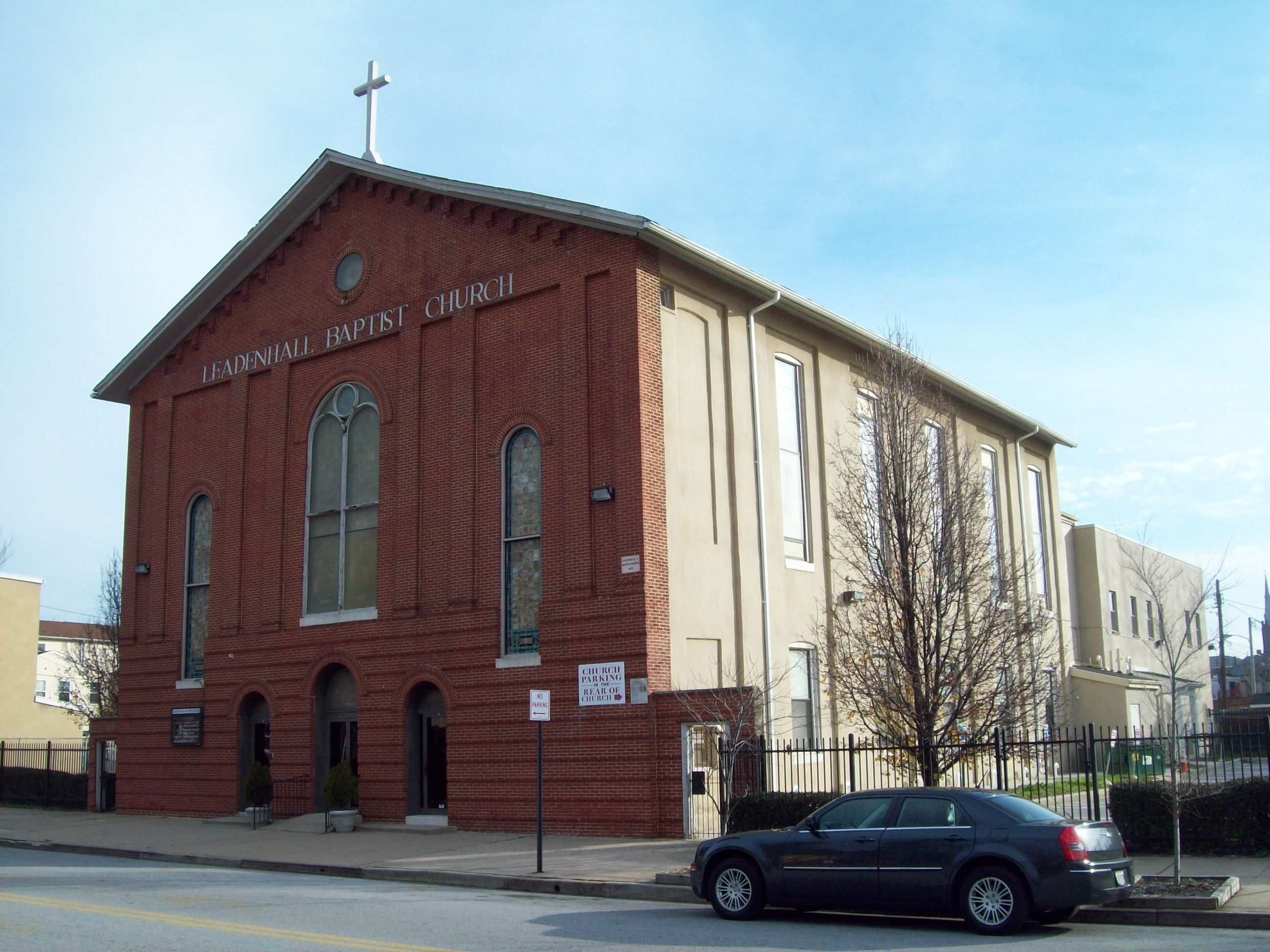
- Leadenhall Street Baptist Church at 1023 Leadenhall Street in Sharp-Leadenhall, Baltimore

- Location within Baltimore Location within Maryland Location within the United States
- Coordinates: 39°16′41″N 76°37′02″W
- Country: United States
- State: Maryland
- City: Baltimore
- Time zone: UTC−5 (Eastern)
  - Summer (DST): UTC−4 (EDT)
- Area Codes: 410, 443, 667

Sharp-Leadenhall is a neighborhood in south Baltimore, Maryland.
