= Parkview/Woodbrook, Baltimore =

Neighborhood in Baltimore

Parkview/Woodbrook
- Neighborhood of Baltimore
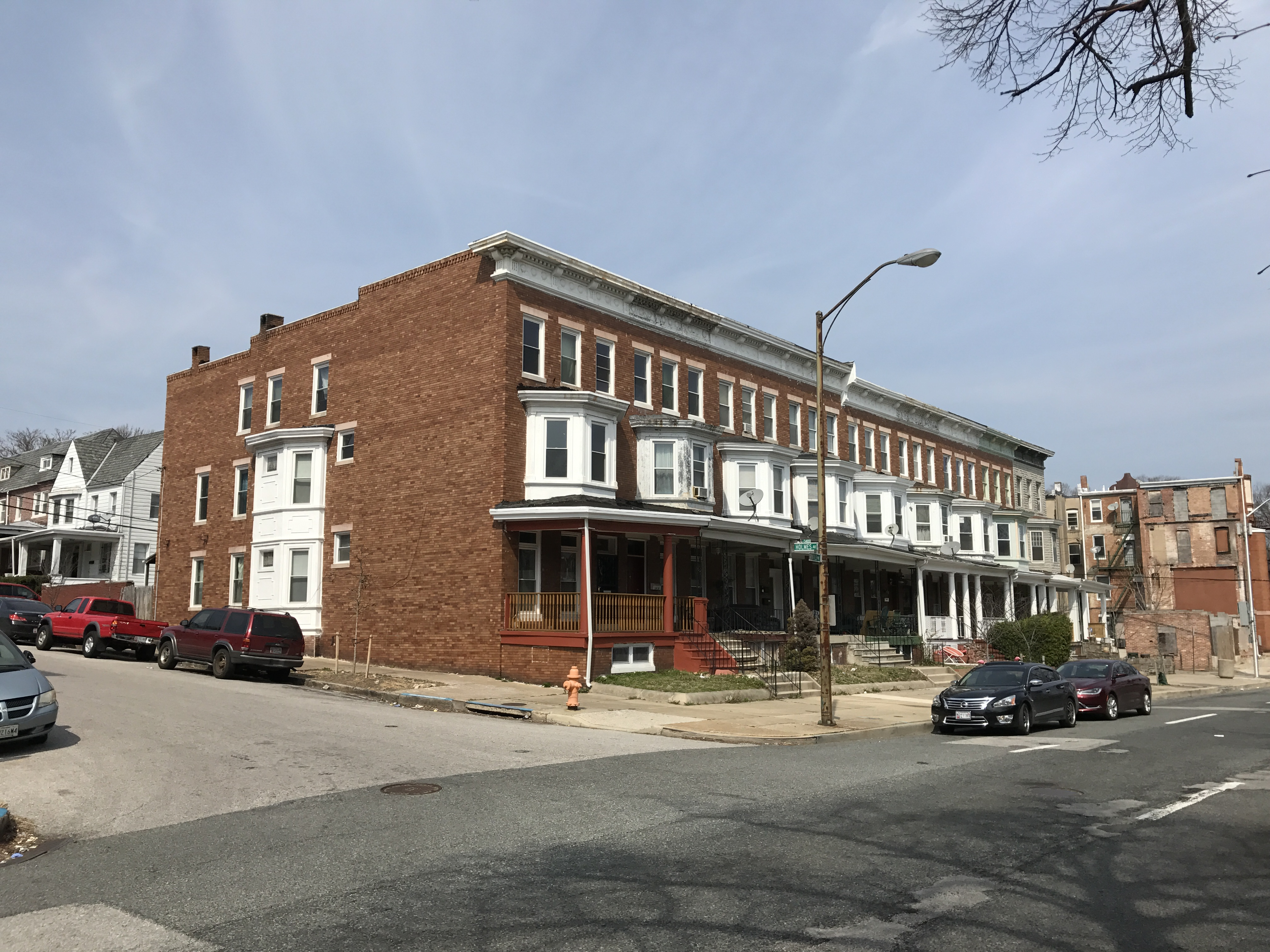
- Rowhouses on the 1600 block of Gwynns Falls Parkway in Parkview/Woodbrook, Baltimore
- Country: United States
- State: Maryland
- City: Baltimore
- Time zone: UTC−5 (Eastern)
  - Summer (DST): UTC−4 (EDT)
- Area Codes: 410, 443, 667

Parkview/Woodbrook is a neighborhood in west Baltimore, Maryland.
