= University of Maryland (neighborhood), Baltimore =

Neighborhood in Baltimore

University of Maryland
- Neighborhood of Baltimore
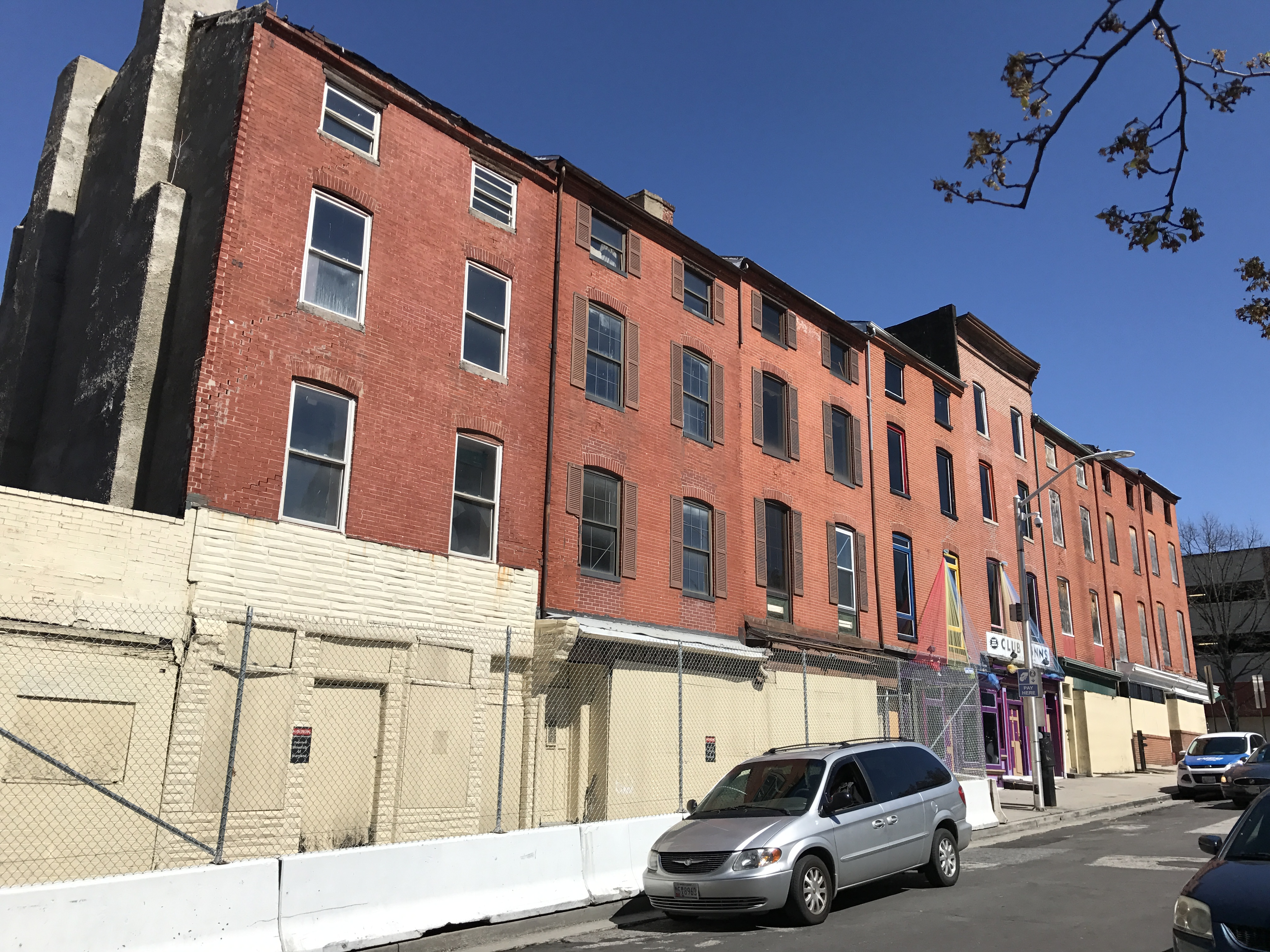
- Buildings on the 600 block of W. Lexington Street in the University of Maryland neighborhood, Baltimore

- Location within Baltimore Location within Maryland Location within the United States
- Coordinates: 39.290°N 76.625°W
- Country: United States
- State: Maryland
- City: Baltimore
- Time zone: UTC−5 (Eastern)
  - Summer (DST): UTC−4 (EDT)
- Area Codes: 410, 443, 667

The University of Maryland neighborhood, encompasses a southwestern portion of downtown Baltimore which includes the University of Maryland, Baltimore.
