= Patterson Place, Baltimore =

Neighborhood in Baltimore

Patterson Place
- Neighborhood of Baltimore
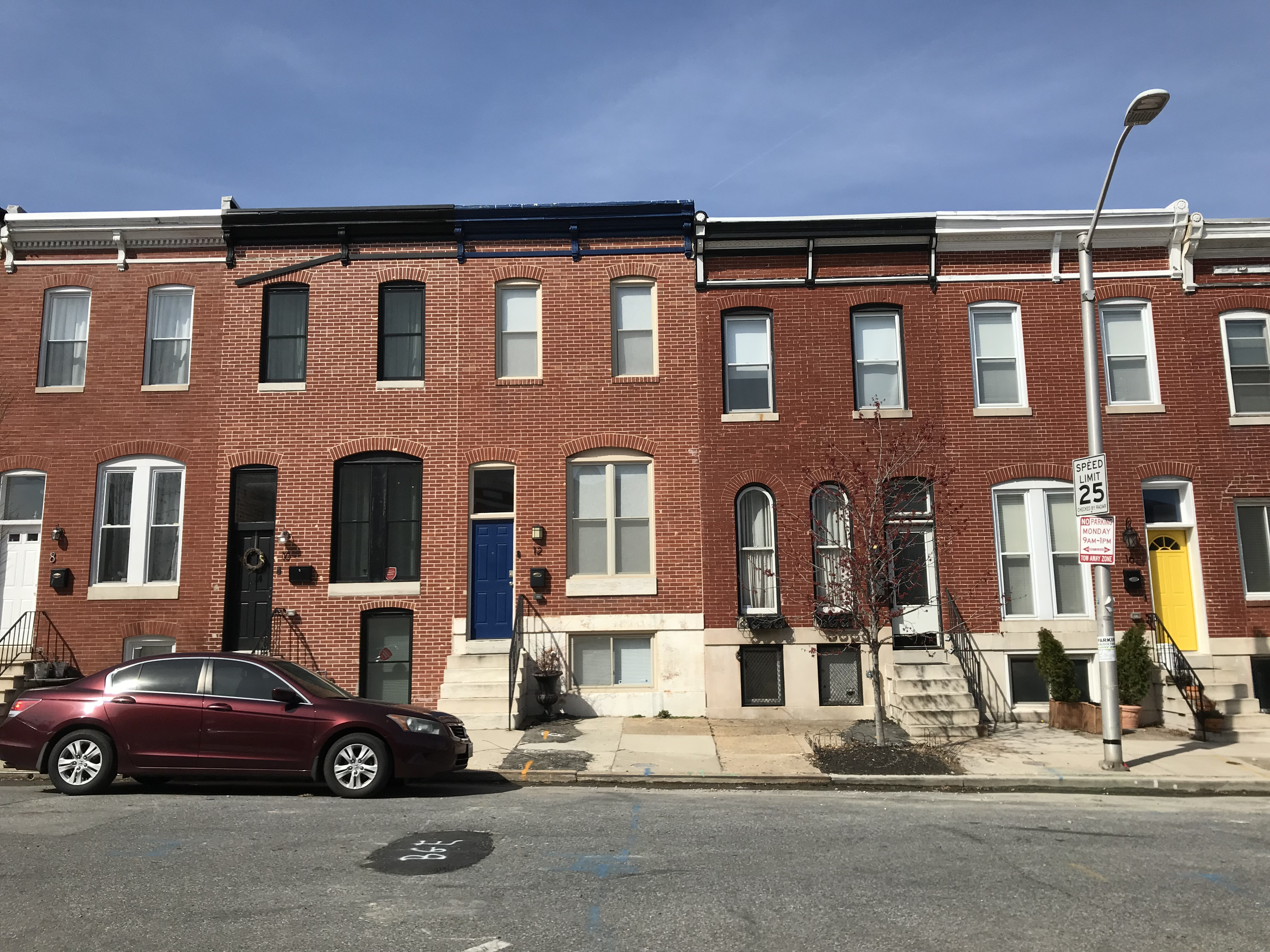
- Rowhouses on 10-14 N. Montford Avenue in Patterson Place, Baltimore

- Location within Baltimore Location within Maryland Location within the United States
- Coordinates: 39°17′37″N 76°35′00″W
- Country: United States
- State: Maryland
- City: Baltimore
- Time zone: UTC−5 (Eastern)
  - Summer (DST): UTC−4 (EDT)
- Area Codes: 410, 443, 667

Patterson Place is a neighborhood in east Baltimore, Maryland.
