= Uplands, Baltimore =

Neighborhood in Baltimore

Uplands
- Neighborhood of Baltimore
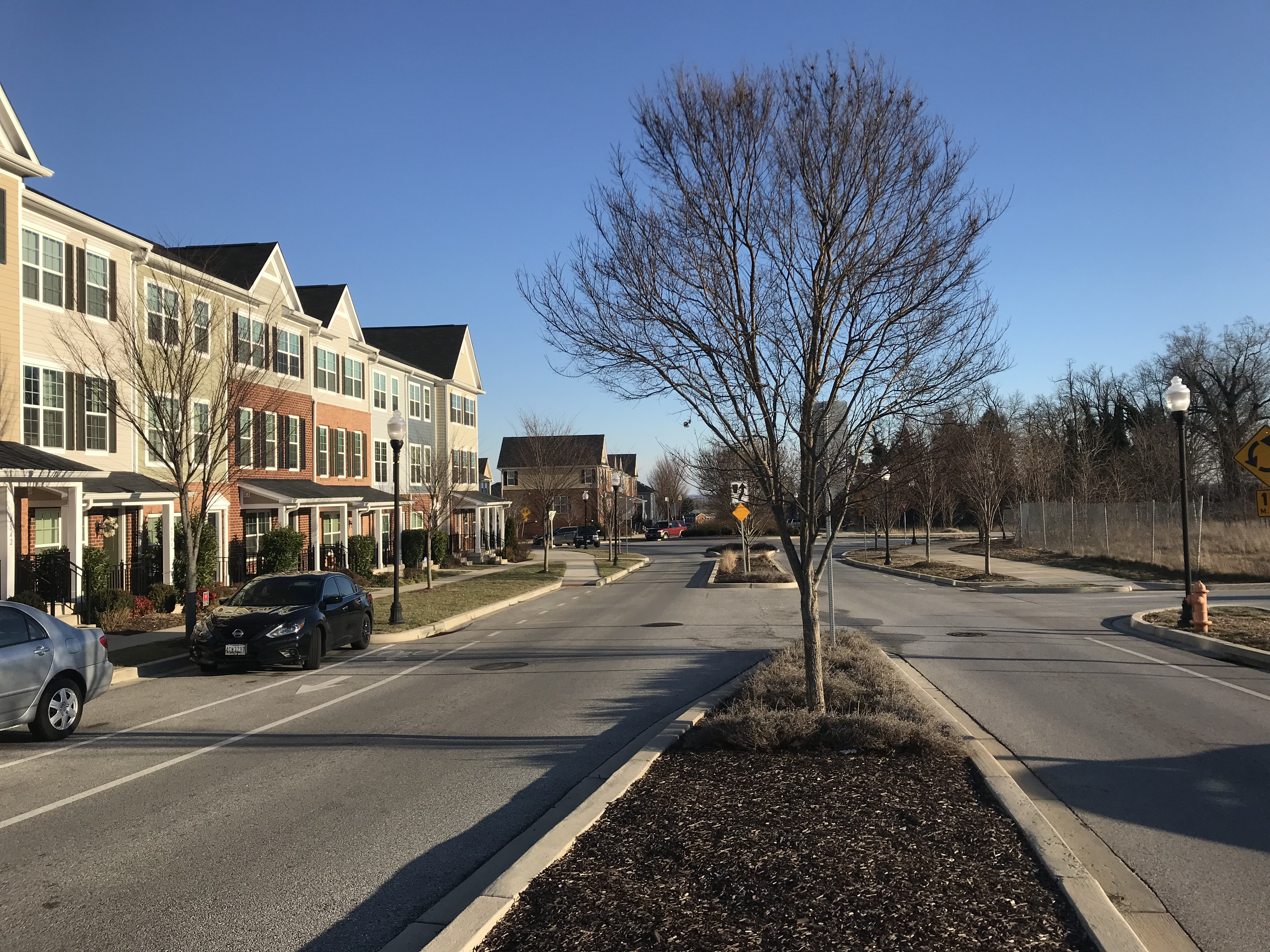
- 4500 block of Old Frederick Road in Upland, Baltimore

- Location within Baltimore Location within Maryland Location within the United States
- Coordinates: 39°17′14″N 76°41′27″W
- Country: United States
- State: Maryland
- City: Baltimore
- Time zone: UTC−5 (Eastern)
  - Summer (DST): UTC−4 (EDT)
- Area Codes: 410, 443, 667

Uplands is a neighborhood in west Baltimore, Maryland.
