= CARE, Baltimore =

Neighborhood in Baltimore

CARE
- Neighborhood of Baltimore
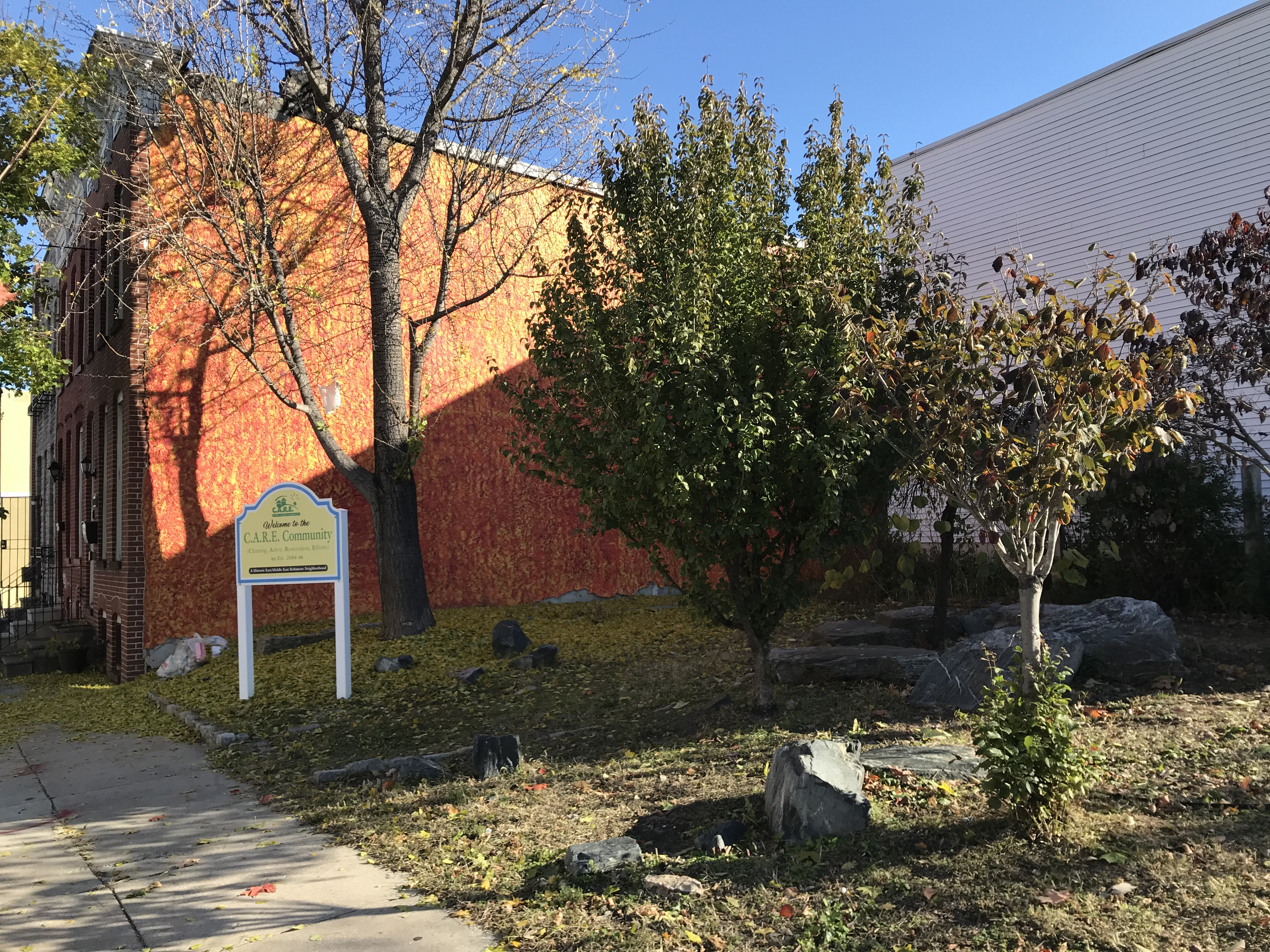
- Sign for the CARE Community at the corner of Orleans Street and N. Chester Street in Baltimore
- Country: United States
- State: Maryland
- City: Baltimore
- Time zone: UTC−5 (Eastern)
  - Summer (DST): UTC−4 (EDT)
- Area Codes: 410, 443, 667

CARE is a neighborhood in east Baltimore, Maryland.
