= North Roland Park/Poplar Hill, Baltimore =

Neighborhood in Baltimore

North Roland Park/Poplar Hill
- Neighborhood of Baltimore
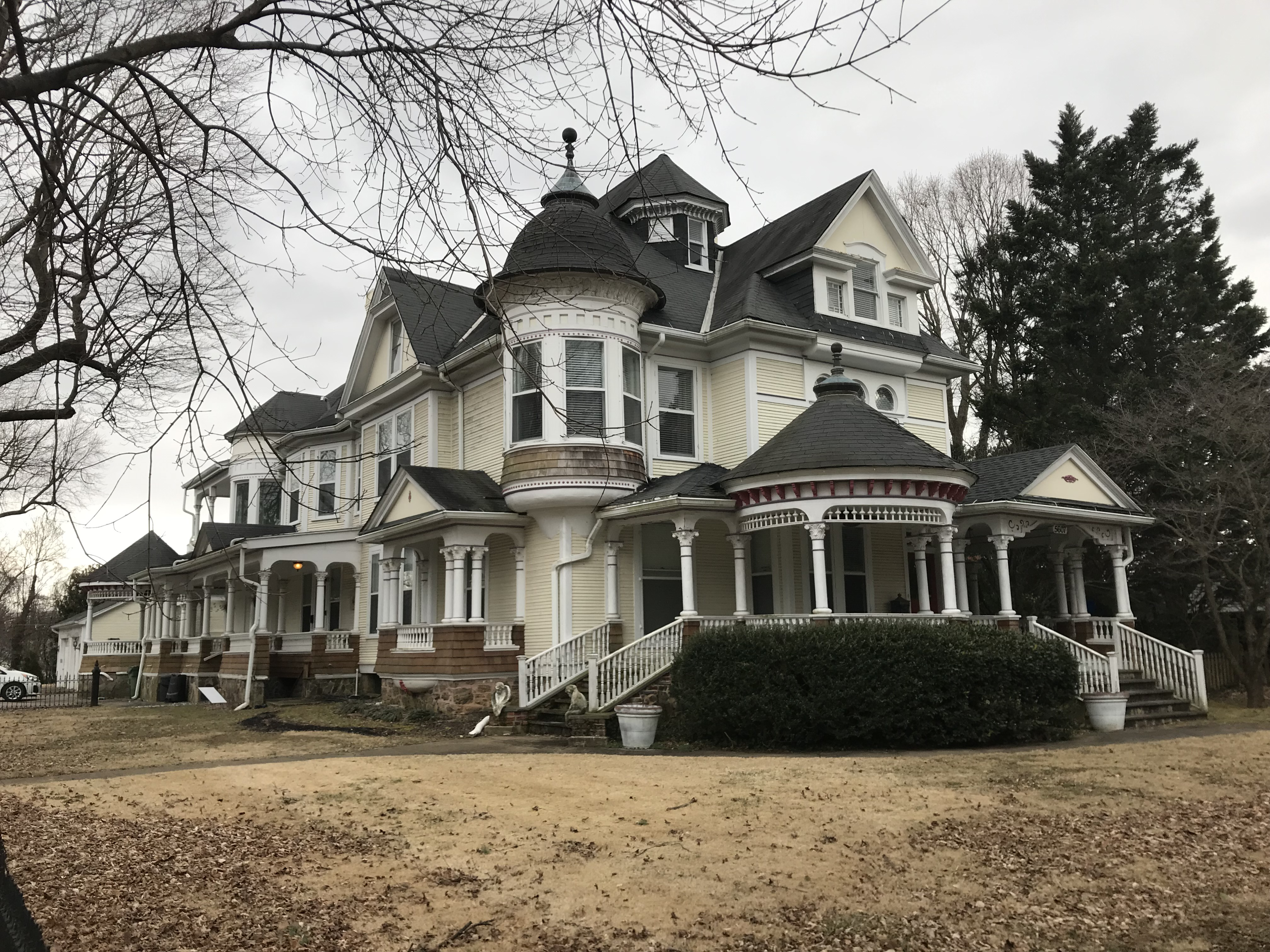
- Detached house on the 5600 block of Roland Avenue in North Roland Park/Poplar Hill, Baltimore

- Location within Baltimore Location within Maryland Location within the United States
- Coordinates: 39.367°N 76.640°W
- Country: United States
- State: Maryland
- City: Baltimore
- Time zone: UTC−5 (Eastern)
  - Summer (DST): UTC−4 (EDT)
- Area Codes: 410, 443, 667

North Roland Park/Poplar Hill is a neighborhood in north Baltimore, Maryland.

North Roland Park is bounded by Falls Road, St. Georges and Kenmore Roads, the City/County line and Northern Parkway. North Roland Park is almost exclusively residential except for the First Christian Church, and a portion of Boys' Latin School. The houses are made up of a mixture of freestanding single family homes to rowhomes. North Roland Park began as parts of the large colonial estate tracts that dominated North Baltimore, and was slowly subdivided into smaller parcels. Beginning in 1898, the area was slowly developed into the modern neighborhood.

The name of Poplar Hill comes from the estate owned by J. W. Ward. It is located west of Falls Road, extends east to Roland Avenue. It is bounded by the City/County line and Northern Parkway. Poplar Hill began as two colonial era tracts, "Edwards and Wills Valley and Hills," and "Morgan's Delight." By the 1870's, Popular Hill had been divided up into a dozen country estates, including J. W. Ward's "Poplar Hill." In the late 1890's Poplar Hill was linked to downtown Baltimore by the Lake Roland Elevated Railway. This spurred residential development, which continued into the 21st century.
