= Jones Falls Area, Baltimore =

Neighborhood in Baltimore

Jones Falls Area
- Neighborhood of Baltimore
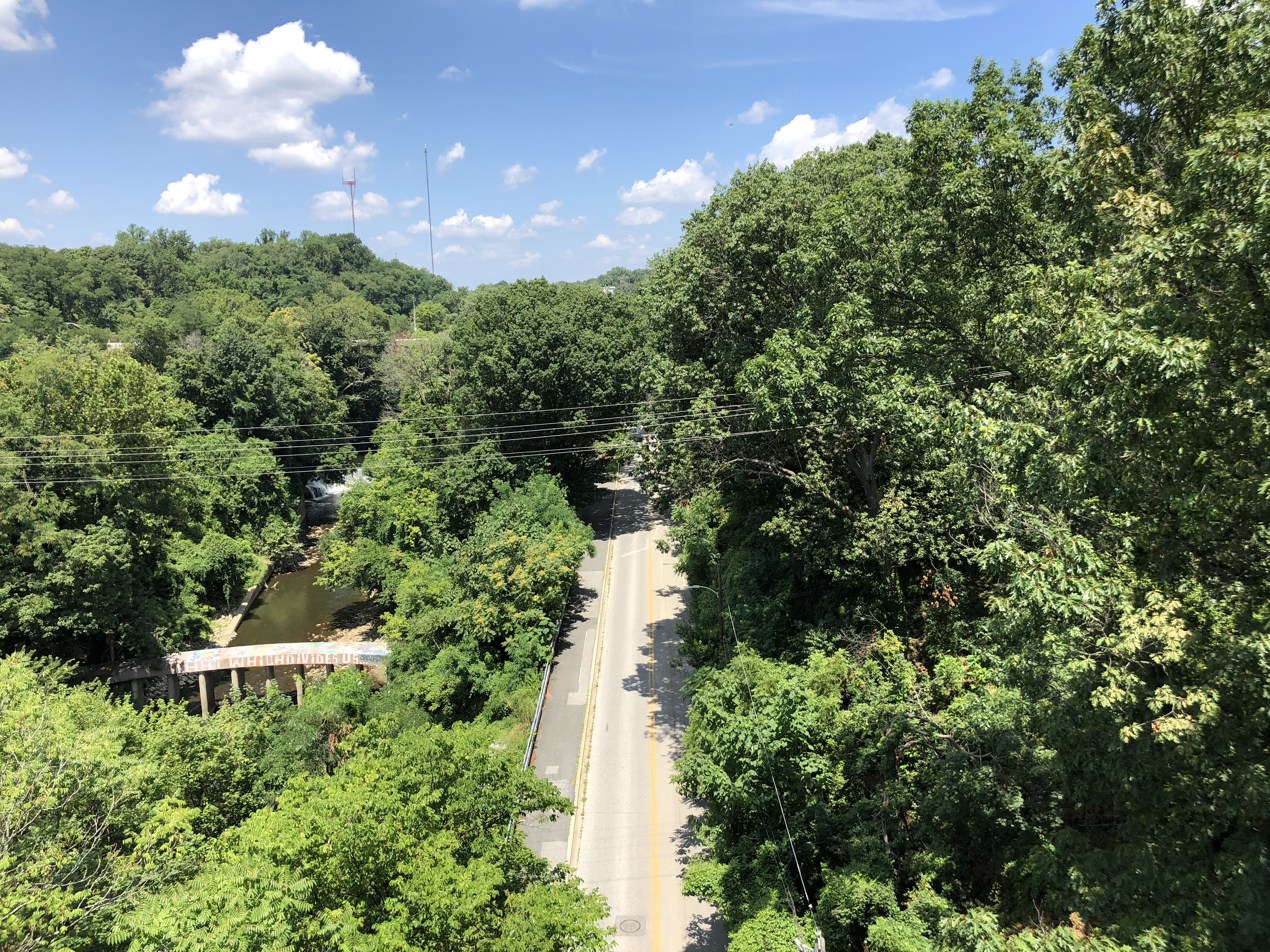
- View north on Falls Road from overpass for W. 29th Street in Jones Falls Area, Baltimore

- Location within Baltimore Location within Maryland Location within the United States
- Coordinates: 39.3181°N 76.6272°W
- Country: United States
- State: Maryland
- City: Baltimore
- Time zone: UTC−5 (Eastern)
  - Summer (DST): UTC−4 (EDT)
- Area Codes: 410, 443, 667

Jones Falls Area is a neighborhood in north Baltimore, Maryland.
