= Oakenshawe Historic District =

Historic district in Maryland, United States

- U.S. National Register of Historic Places
- U.S. Historic district
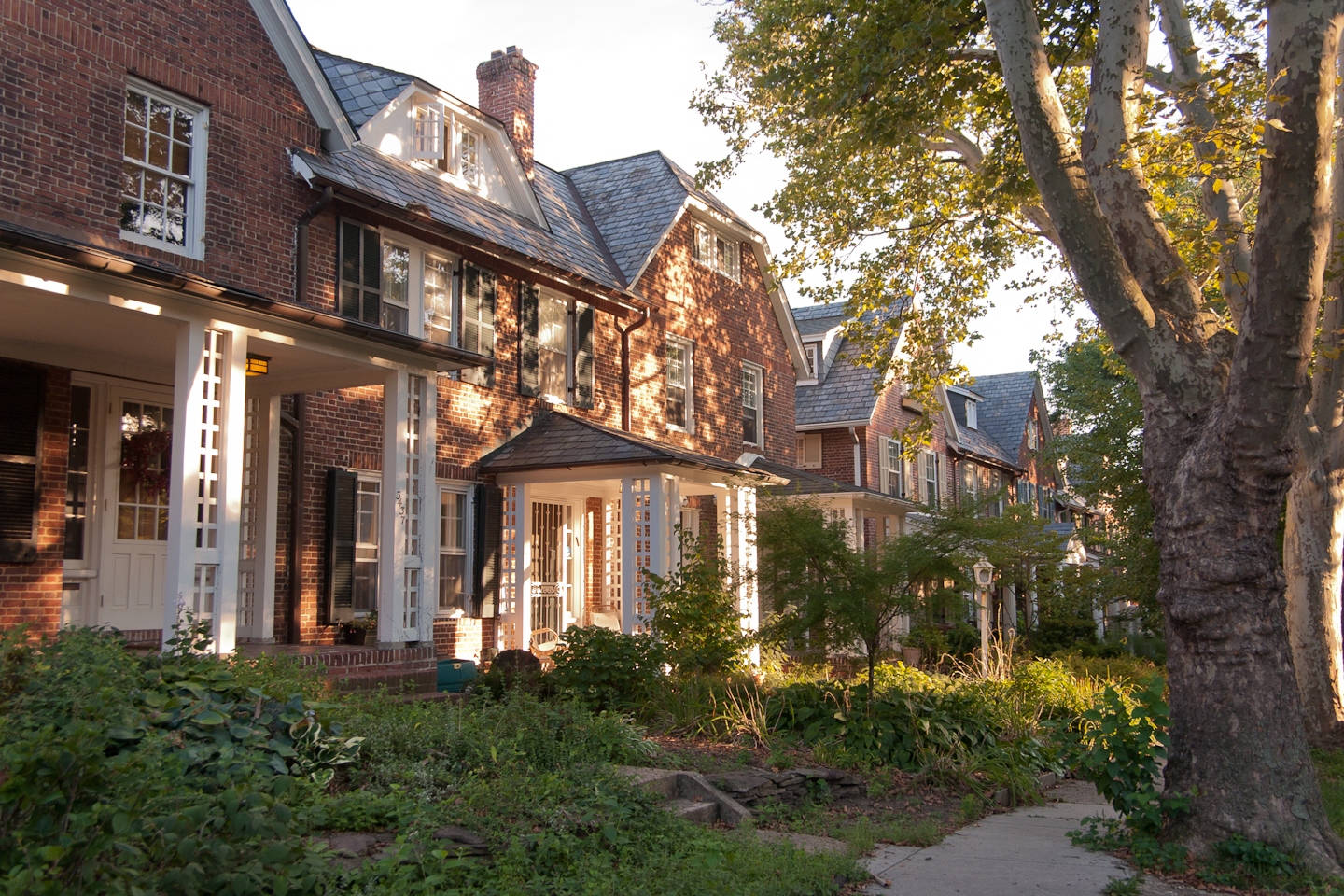
- Houses along Guilford Terrace, August 2011

- Location within Baltimore Location within Maryland Location within the United States
- Location: roughly bounded by York Rd., University Pkwy., Calvert St., and Southway, Baltimore, Maryland
- Coordinates: 39°19′55″N 76°36′48″W
- Area: 18 acres (7.3 ha)
- Architect: Multiple
- Architectural style: Gothic, Italianate, et al.
- NRHP reference No.: 03001293
- Added to NRHP: December 18, 2003

Oakenshawe Historic District is a national historic district in Baltimore, Maryland, United States. It comprises 334 buildings which reflect the neighborhood's development during the period 1890 to about 1926. The neighborhood evolved in two stages on the 19th century Wilson estate. The first phase of growth is represented by frame houses dating from 1890 to about 1910 reflecting vernacular interpretations of the Victorian Gothic and Italianate styles. The second stage of development began in the World War I era, when several developers transformed the property by constructing a neighborhood of brick "daylight" rowhouses in revival styles popular at the time.

It was added to the National Register of Historic Places in 2003.

== See also ==
- List of Baltimore neighborhoods
