= Rosebank, Baltimore =

Neighborhood in Baltimore

Rosebank
- Neighborhood of Baltimore
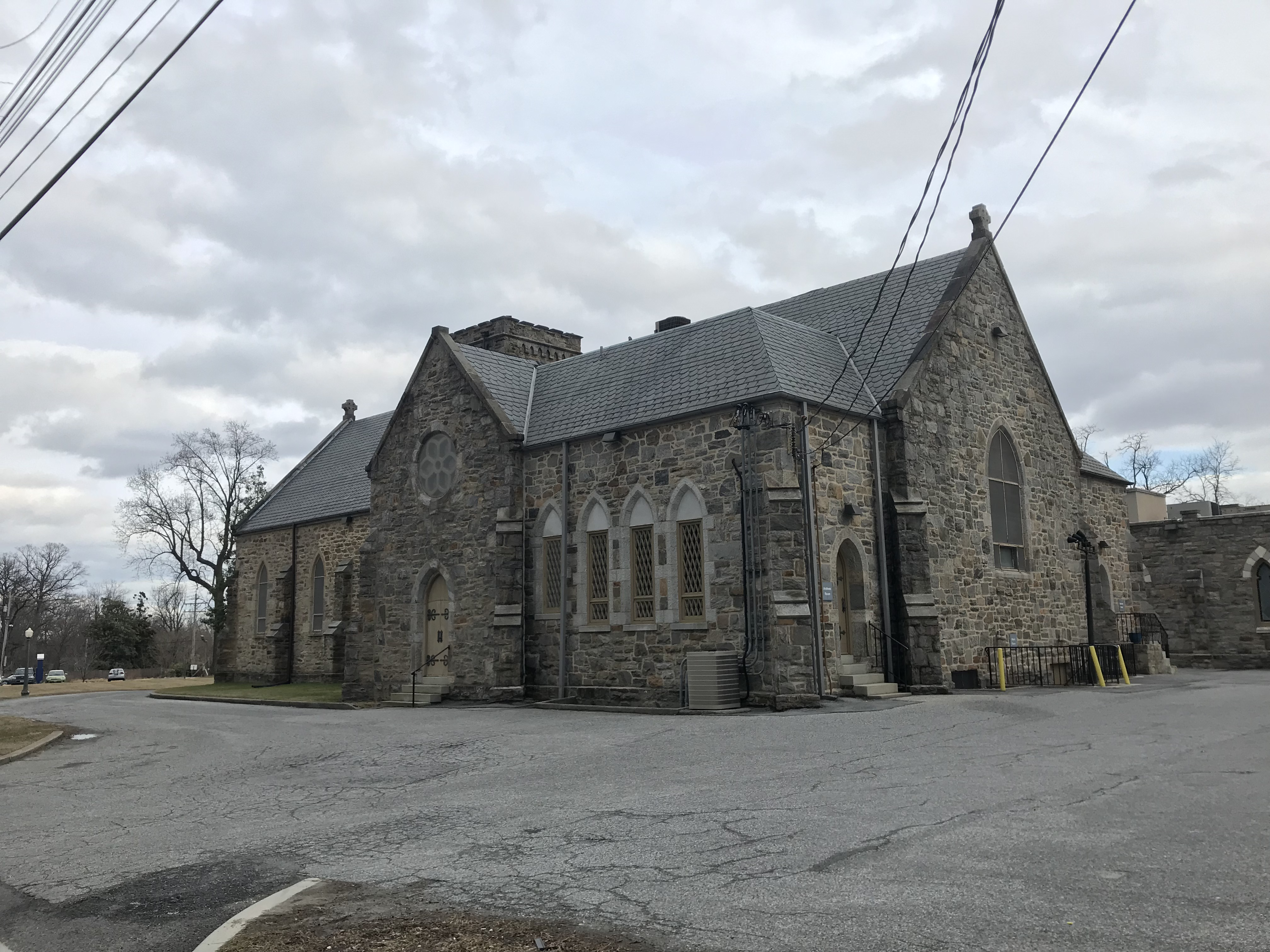
- Govans Presbyterian Church on the 5800 block of York Road in Rosebank, Baltimore
- Country: United States
- State: Maryland
- City: Baltimore
- Time zone: UTC−5 (Eastern)
  - Summer (DST): UTC−4 (EDT)
- Area Codes: 410, 443, 667

Rosebank is a neighborhood in north Baltimore, Maryland.
