= North Harford Road, Baltimore =

Neighborhood in Baltimore

North Harford Road
- Neighborhood of Baltimore
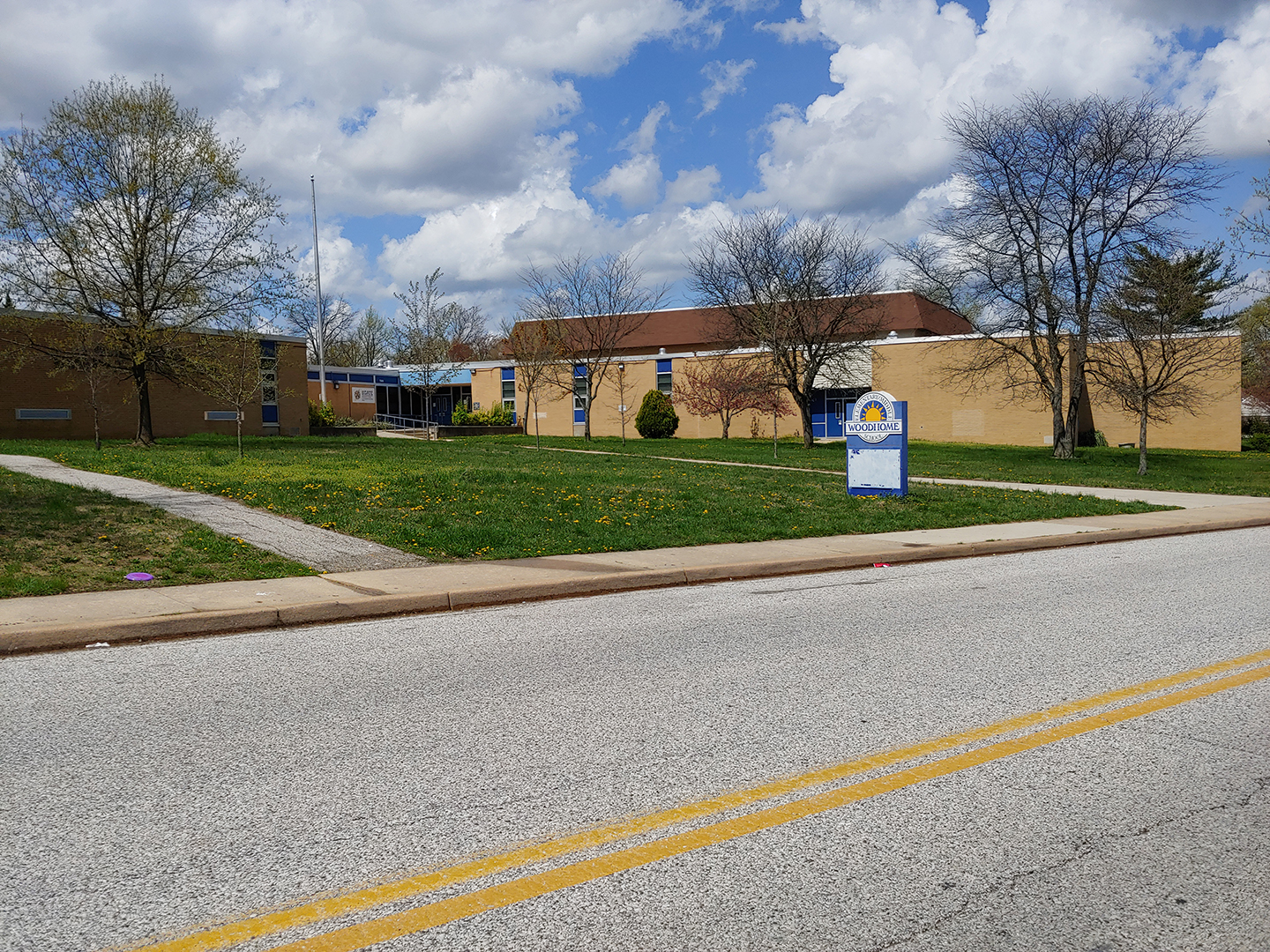
- Woodhome Elementary-Middle School at 7300 Moyer Avenue in North Harford Road, Baltimore

- Location within Baltimore Location within Maryland Location within the United States
- Coordinates: 39°22′01″N 76°32′23″W
- Country: United States
- State: Maryland
- City: Baltimore
- Time zone: UTC−5 (Eastern)
  - Summer (DST): UTC−4 (EDT)
- Area Codes: 410, 443, 667

North Harford Road is a neighborhood in northeast Baltimore, Maryland.
