= Charles North, Baltimore =

Neighborhood in Baltimore

Charles North
- Neighborhood of Baltimore
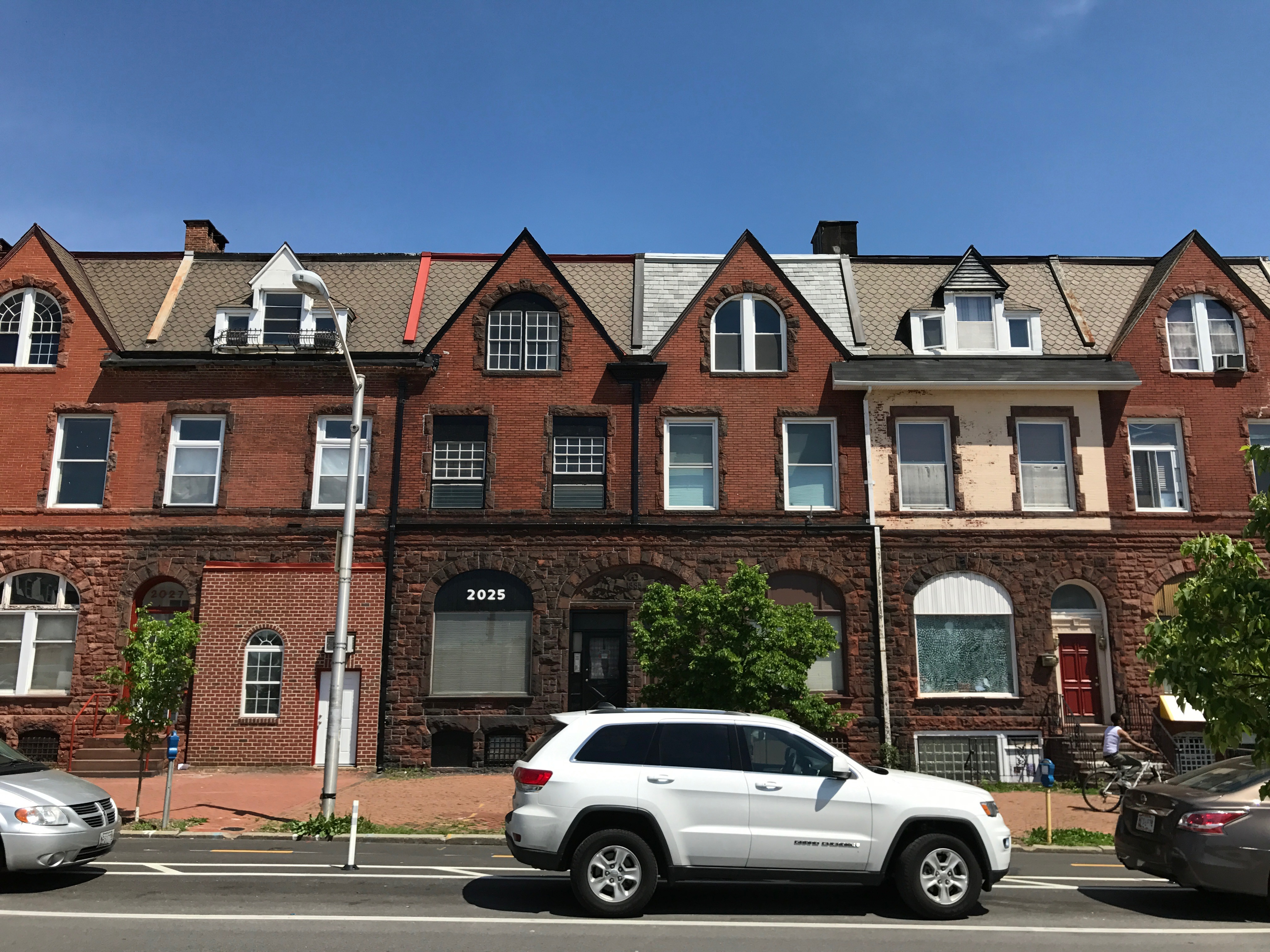
- Rowhouses on the 2000 block of Maryland Avenue in Charles North, Baltimore

- Location within Baltimore Location within Maryland Location within the United States
- Coordinates: 39°18′40″N 76°37′01″W
- Country: United States
- State: Maryland
- City: Baltimore
- Time zone: UTC−5 (Eastern)
  - Summer (DST): UTC−4 (EDT)
- Area Codes: 410, 443, 667

Charles North is a neighborhood in north Baltimore, Maryland. Baltimore Penn Station is located in the neighborhood.
