= Pleasant View Gardens, Baltimore =

Neighborhood in Baltimore

Pleasant View Gardens
- Neighborhood of Baltimore
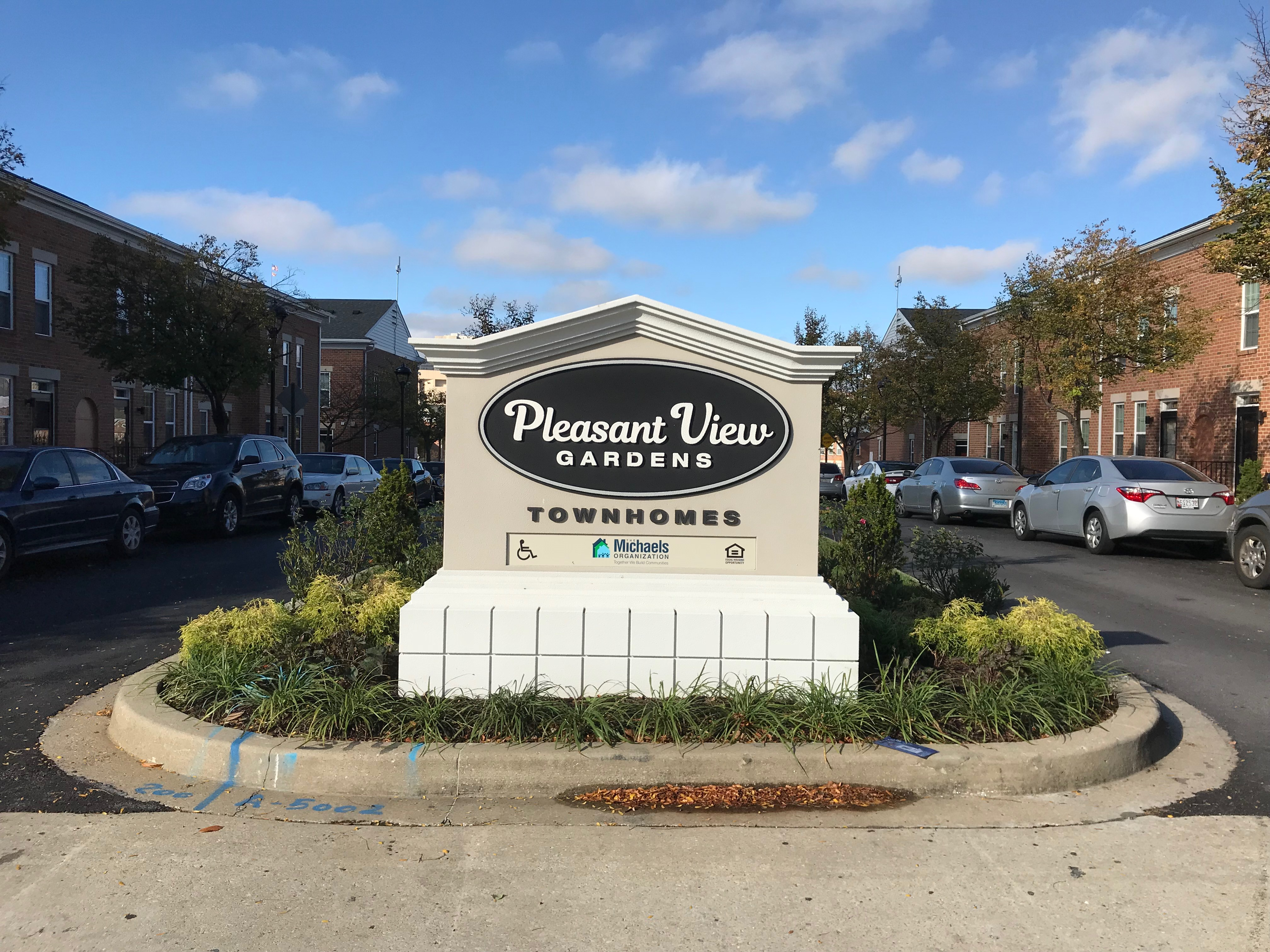
- Entrance sign to Pleasant View Gardens Townhomes at Aisquith Street and New Hope Circle in Baltimore
- Country: United States
- State: Maryland
- City: Baltimore
- Time zone: UTC−5 (Eastern)
  - Summer (DST): UTC−4 (EDT)
- Area Codes: 410, 443, 667

Pleasant View Gardens is a neighborhood in southeast Baltimore, Maryland.
