= Canton Industrial Area, Baltimore =

Neighborhood in Baltimore

Canton Industrial Area
- Neighborhood of Baltimore
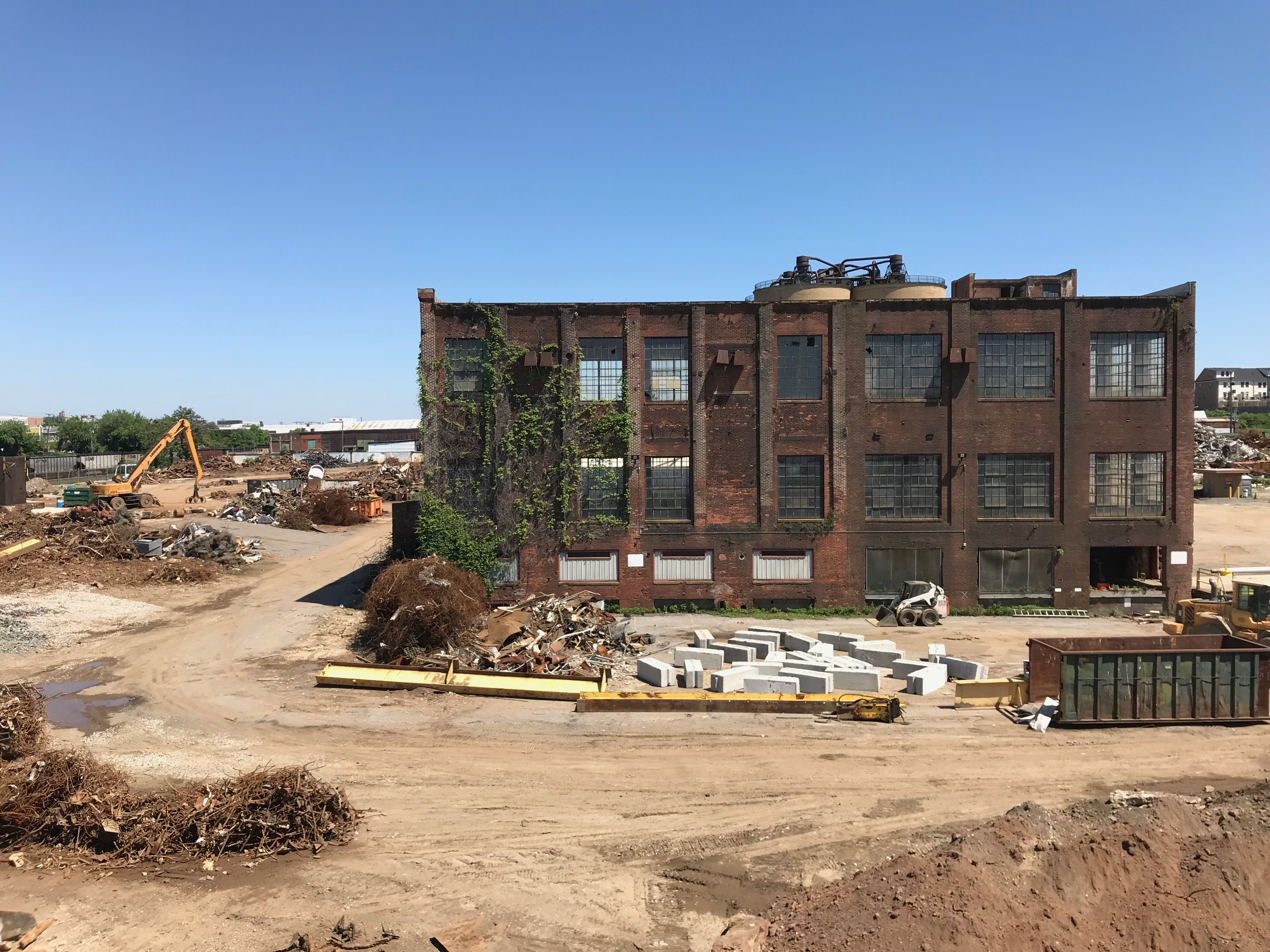
- Canton Metal Recycling Baltimore Scrap Corporation on the 900 block of S. Kresson Street, Canton Industrial Area, Baltimore

- Location within Baltimore Location within Maryland Location within the United States
- Coordinates: 39.299°N 76.539°W
- Country: United States
- State: Maryland
- City: Baltimore
- Time zone: UTC−5 (Eastern)
  - Summer (DST): UTC−4 (EDT)
- Area Codes: 410, 443, 667

Canton Industrial Area is a neighborhood in east Baltimore, Maryland.
