= South Clifton Park, Baltimore =

Neighborhood in Baltimore

South Clifton Park
- Neighborhood of Baltimore
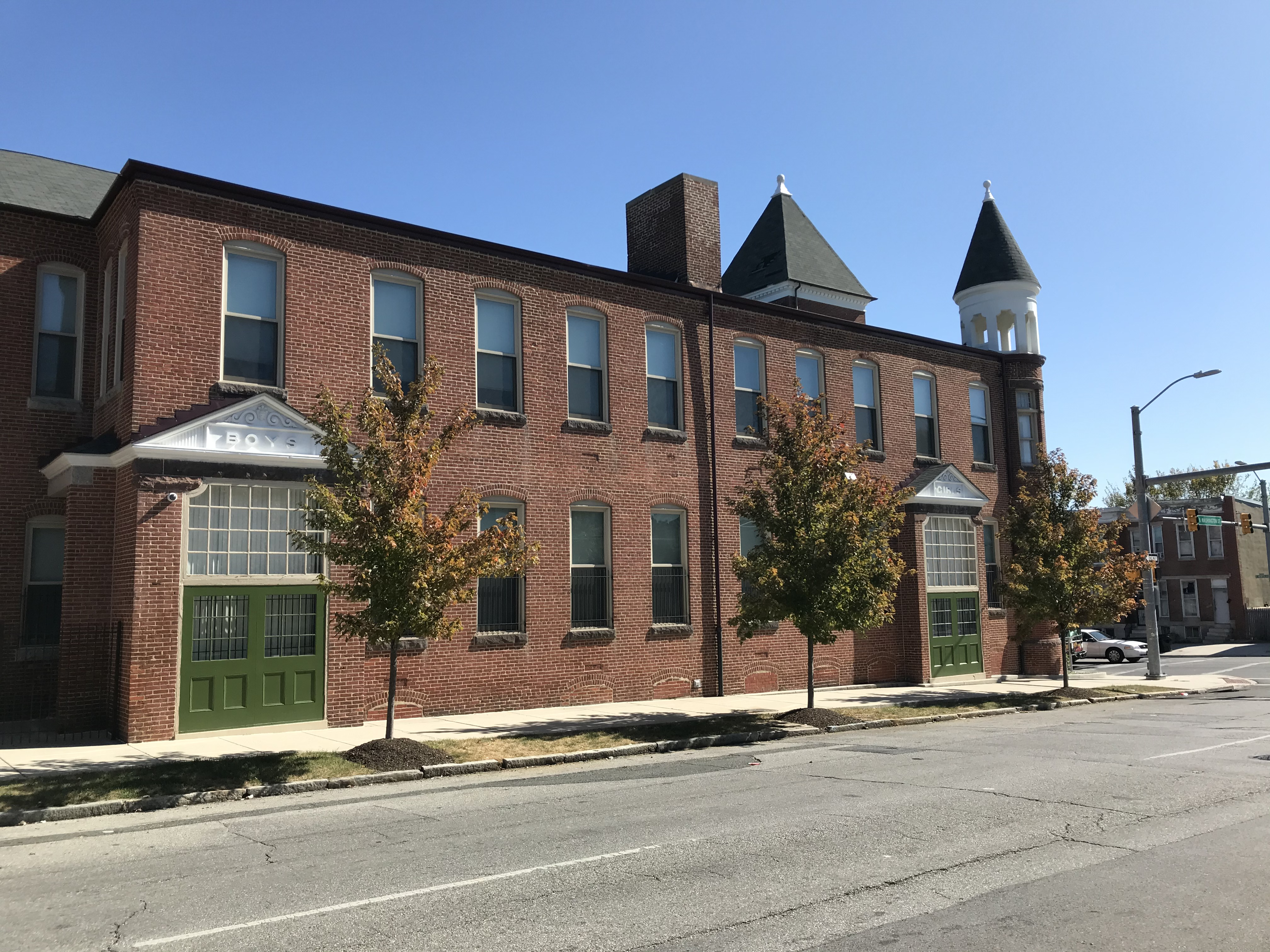
- Columbus School Apartments at the corner of E. North Avenue and N. Washington Street in South Clifton Park, Baltimore

- Location within Baltimore Location within Maryland Location within the United States
- Coordinates: 39°18′48″N 76°35′24″W
- Country: United States
- State: Maryland
- City: Baltimore
- Time zone: UTC−5 (Eastern)
  - Summer (DST): UTC−4 (EDT)
- Area Codes: 410, 443, 667

South Clifton Park is a neighborhood in east Baltimore, Maryland.
