= Gay Street (neighborhood), Baltimore =

Neighborhood in Baltimore

Gay Street
- Neighborhood of Baltimore
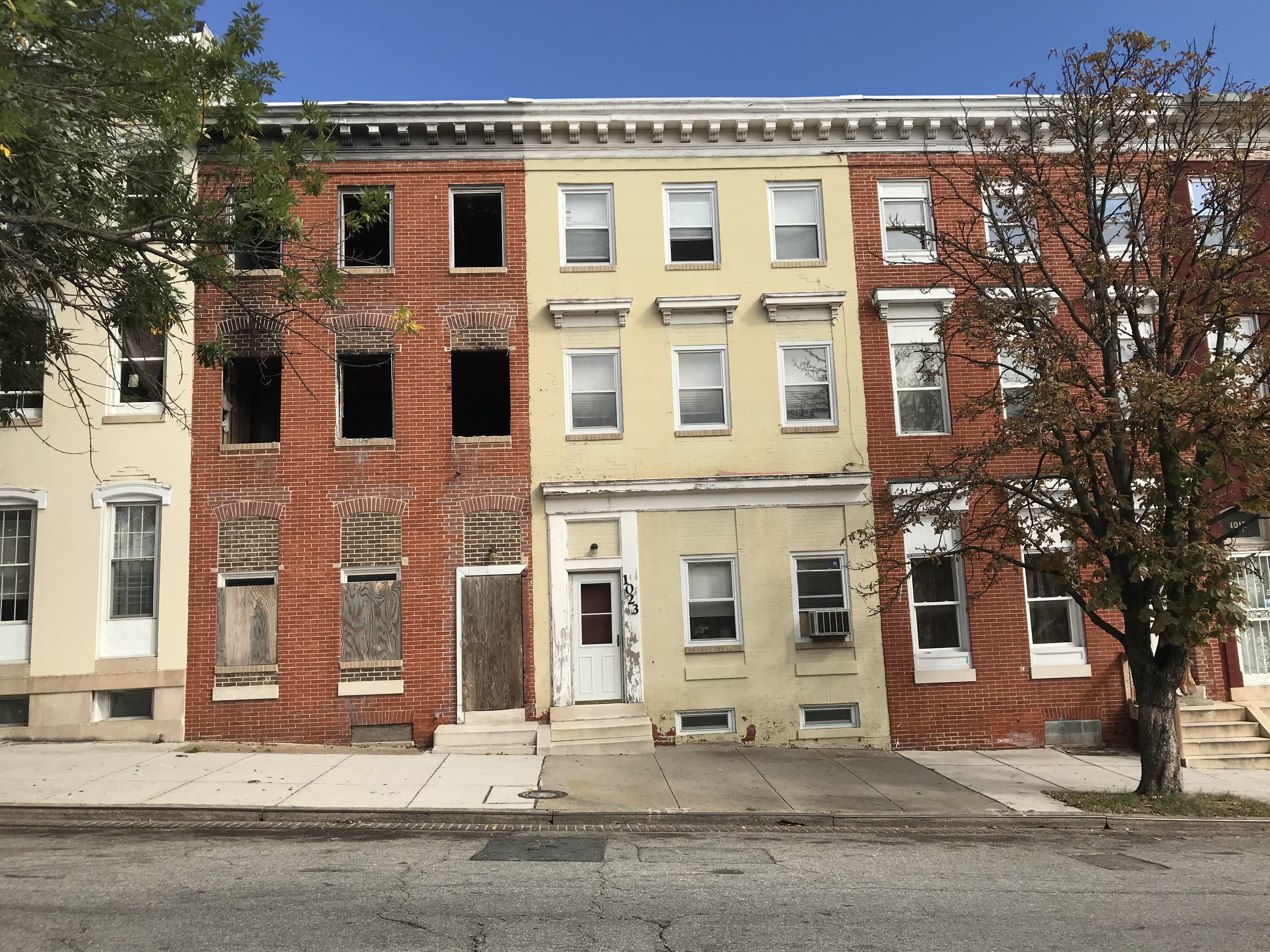
- Rowhouses on the 1000 block of N. Caroline Street in Gay Street, Baltimore

- Location within Baltimore Location within Maryland Location within the United States
- Coordinates: 39°18′05″N 76°35′51″W
- Country: United States
- State: Maryland
- City: Baltimore

Population (2020)
  - Total: 1,728
- Time zone: UTC−5 (Eastern)
  - Summer (DST): UTC−4 (EDT)
- Area Codes: 410, 443, 667

Gay Street is a neighborhood in southeast Baltimore, Maryland. It had a population of 1,728 at the 2020 U.S. census.

== Demographics ==
Historical population
| Census | Pop. | Note | %± |
|---|---|---|---|
| 2010 | 1,998 | | — |
| 2020 | 1,728 | | −13.5% |
Source: Baltimore Department of Planning

At the 2020 U.S. census, Gay Street had a population of 1,728. Racially, it was 94% black or African American, 2% white, 2% of two races, and 1% Asian. Hispanic or Latino people of any race comprised 1%. It had 873 housing units, of which 776 were occupied and 97 were vacant.

At the 2010 census, Gay Street had a population of 1,998. 97% were black or African American, 1% were white, 1% were Asian, and 1% were of two or more races. 1% were Hispanic or Latino. Of its 927 housing units, 800 were occupied and 127 were vacant.
