= Mount Clare, Baltimore =

Neighborhood in Baltimore

- Neighborhood of Baltimore
- Location within Baltimore Location within Maryland Location within the United States
- Coordinates: 39°16′59″N 76°38′34″W
- Country: United States
- State: Maryland
- City: Baltimore
- Time zone: UTC−5 (Eastern)
  - Summer (DST): UTC−4 (EDT)
- Area Codes: 410, 443, 667

Mount Clare, also known as New Southwest and officially New Southwest/Mount Clare, is a neighborhood in southwest Baltimore, Maryland.
