= Franklintown Road, Baltimore =

Neighborhood in Baltimore

Franklintown Road
- Neighborhood of Baltimore
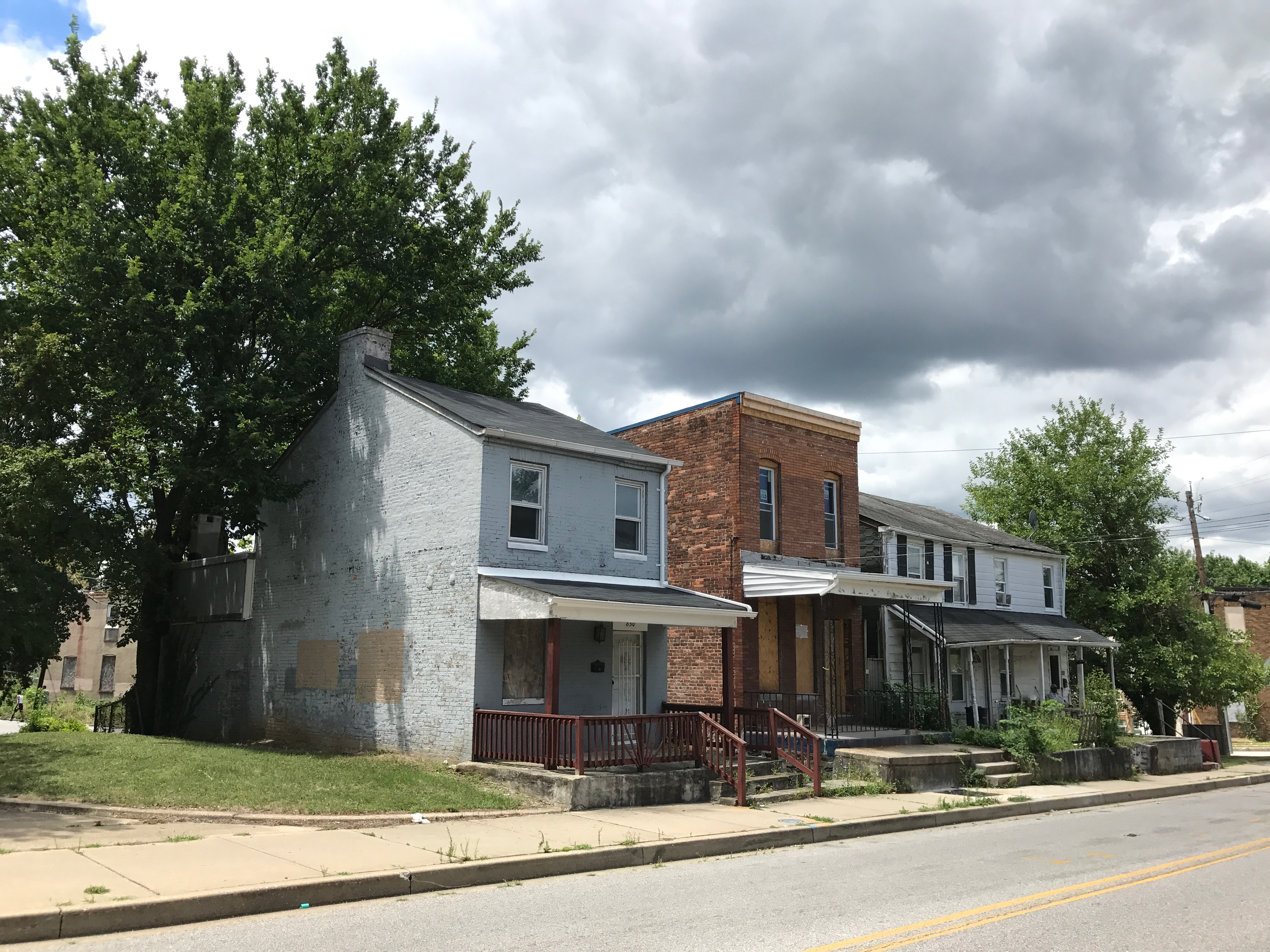
- Houses on the 800 block of N. Franklintown Road in the Franklintown Road neighborhood, Baltimore

- Location within Baltimore Location within Maryland Location within the United States
- Coordinates: 39°17′50″N 76°40′04″W
- Country: United States
- State: Maryland
- City: Baltimore
- Time zone: UTC−5 (Eastern)
  - Summer (DST): UTC−4 (EDT)
- Area Codes: 410, 443, 667

Franklintown Road is a neighborhood in west Baltimore, Maryland.
