= Westfield, Baltimore =

Neighborhood in Baltimore

Westfield
- Neighborhood of Baltimore
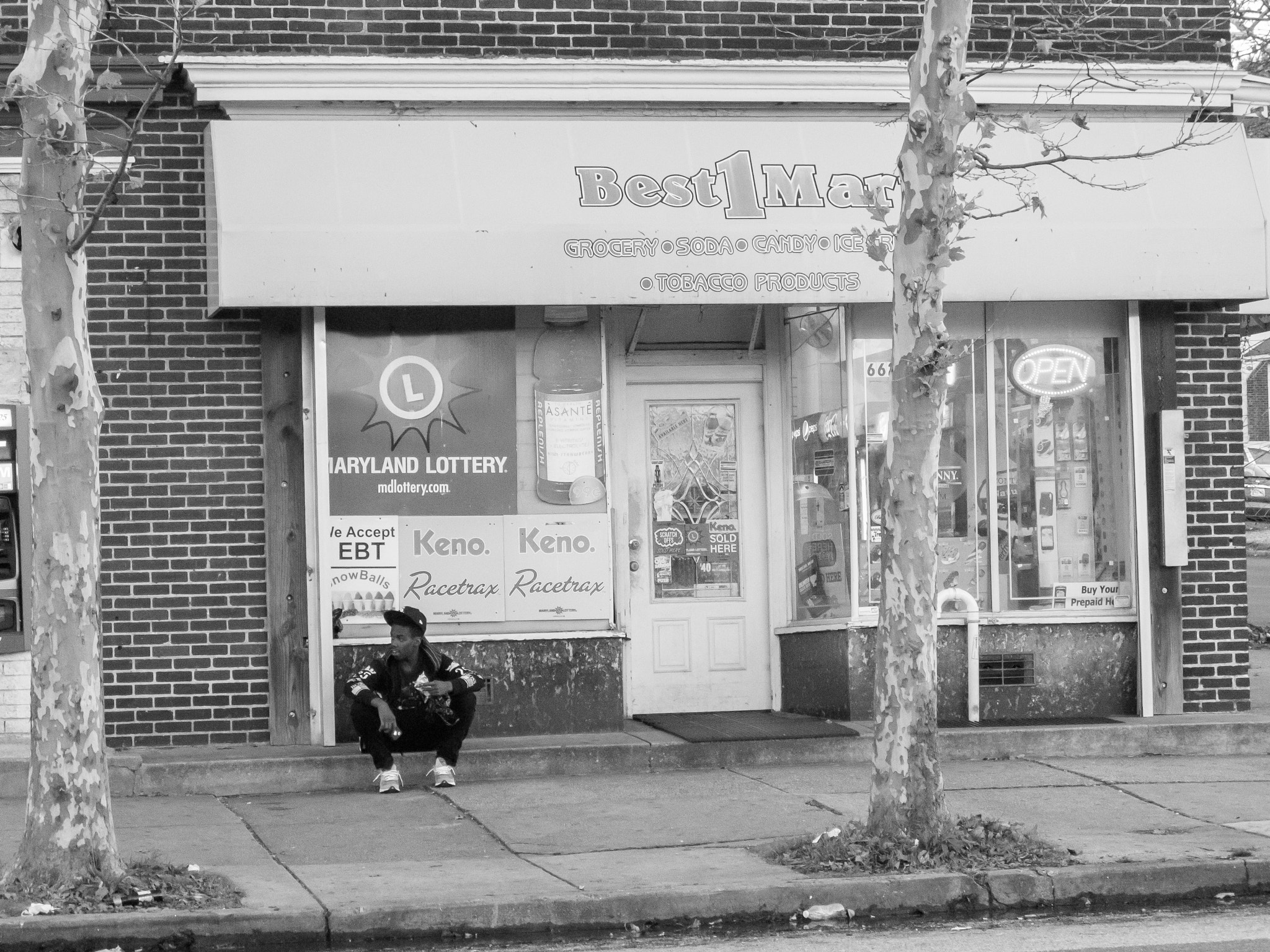
- Convenience store on the 6600 block of Harford Road in Westfield, Baltimore

- Location within Baltimore Location within Maryland Location within the United States
- Coordinates: 39°21′34″N 76°33′05″W
- Country: United States
- State: Maryland
- City: Baltimore
- Time zone: UTC−5 (Eastern)
  - Summer (DST): UTC−4 (EDT)
- Area Codes: 410, 443, 667

Westfield is a neighborhood in northeast Baltimore, Maryland.
