= Ten Hills, Baltimore =

Neighborhood in Baltimore

Ten Hills
- Neighborhood of Baltimore
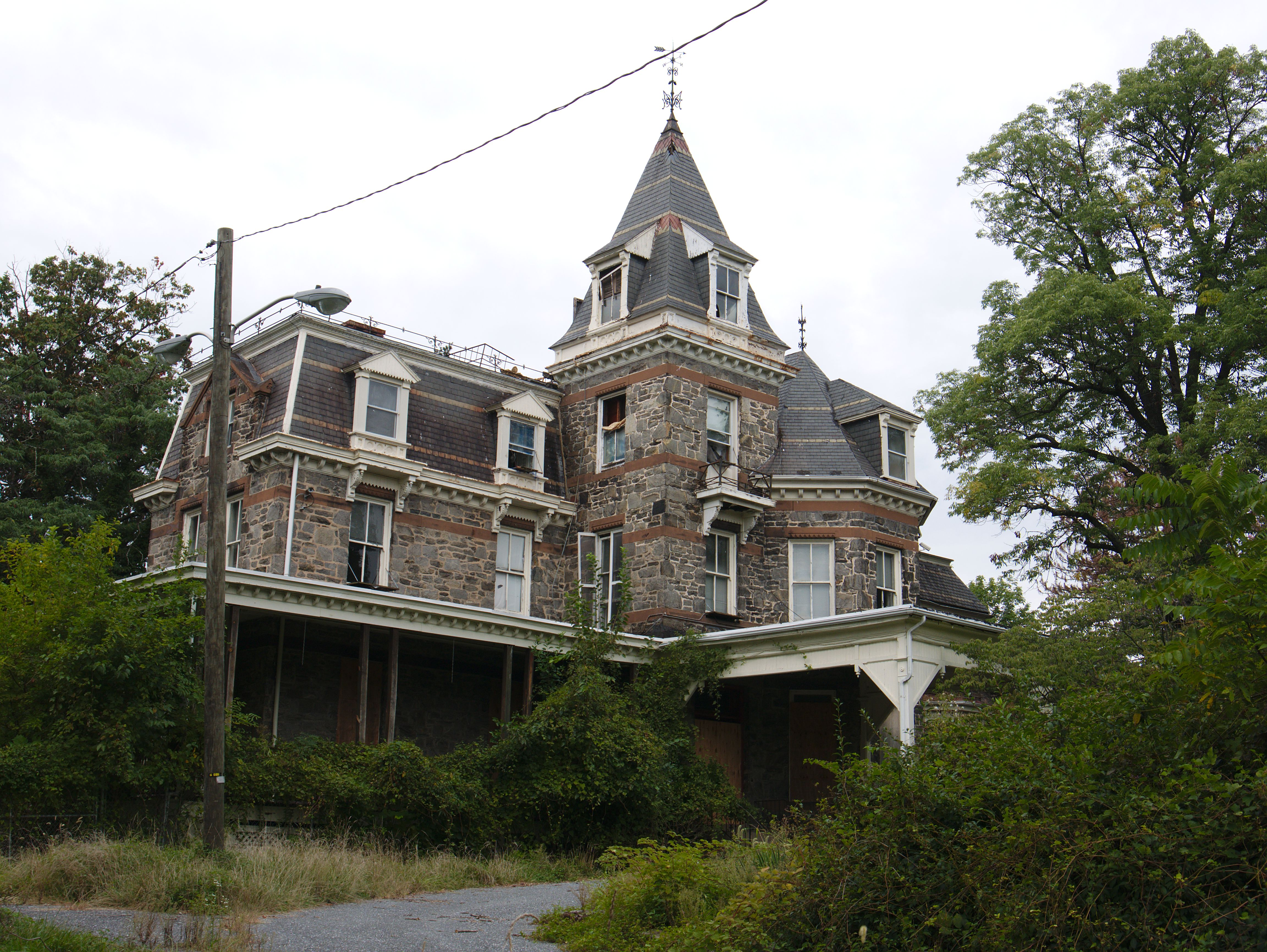
- Gundry-Glass Hospital at 2 N. Wickham Road in Ten Hills, Baltimore

- Location within Baltimore Location within Maryland Location within the United States
- Coordinates: 39°17′20″N 76°42′09″W
- Country: United States
- State: Maryland
- City: Baltimore
- Time zone: UTC−5 (Eastern)
  - Summer (DST): UTC−4 (EDT)
- Area Codes: 410, 443, 667

Ten Hills is a neighborhood in west Baltimore, Maryland.

== History ==
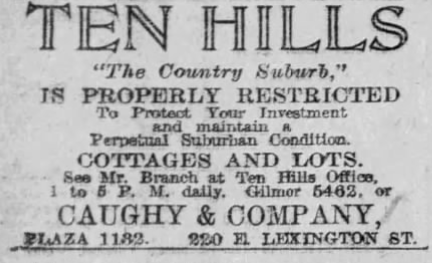
A 1924 advertisement in the Baltimore Sun for "properly restricted" houses in Ten Hills.

Prior to the passage of the Fair Housing Act of 1968, racially restrictive covenants were used in Baltimore to exclude African-Americans and other minorities. A 1924 Baltimore Sun advertisement for houses in Ten Hills sold by Caughy & Company describes the community as "properly restricted to protect your investment and to maintain a perpetual suburban condition."
