= Liberty Square, Baltimore =

Neighborhood of Baltimore, Maryland, US

Liberty Square
- Neighborhood of Baltimore
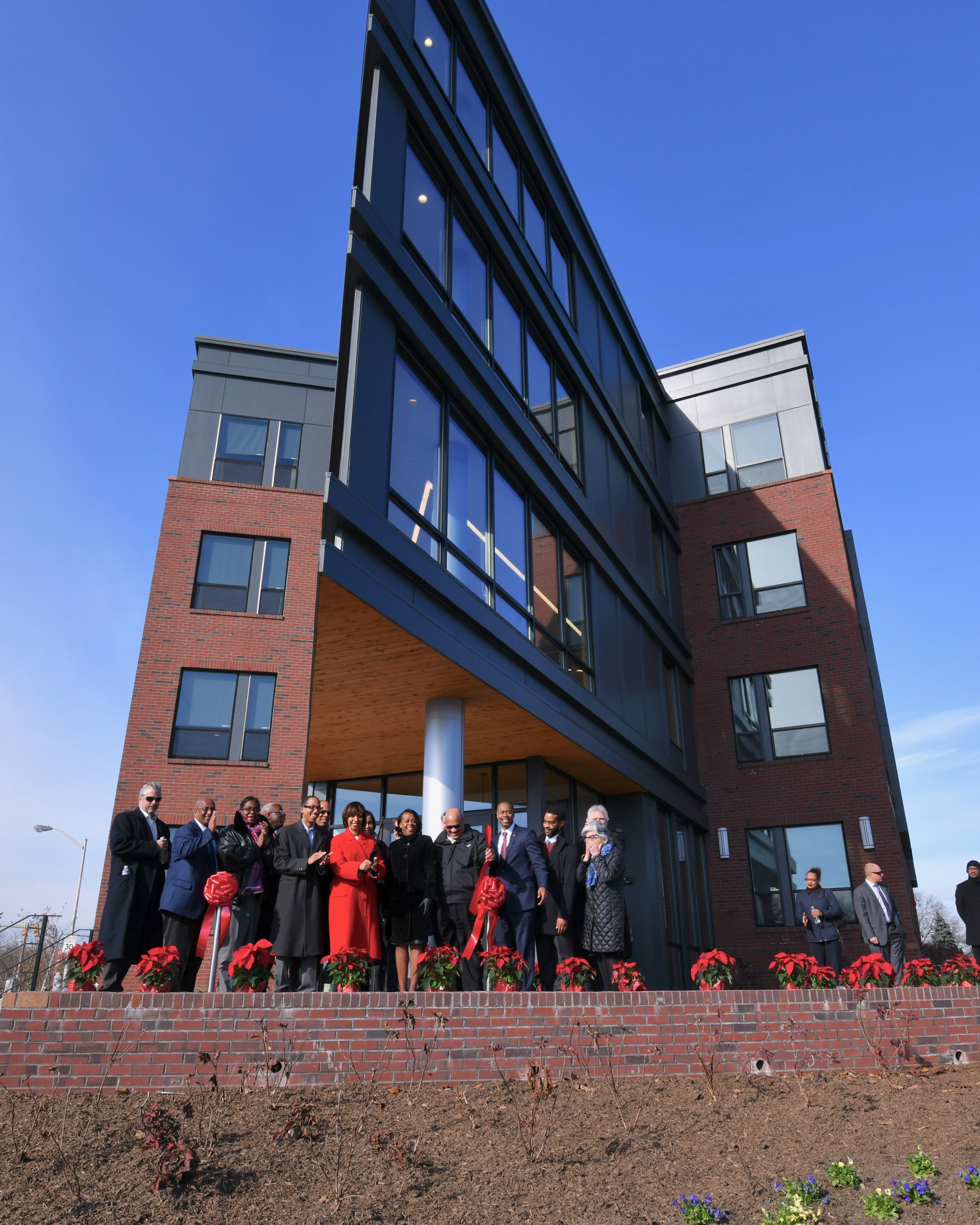
- Metro Heights at Mondawmin apartments on the 2700 block of Reisterstown Road in Liberty Square, Baltimore

- Location within Baltimore
- Coordinates: 39°19′18″N 76°39′27″W
- Country: United States
- State: Maryland
- County: n/a
- City: Baltimore

Population
  - Total: 595
  - Density: 1,974/km^{2} (5,113/sq mi)
- Time zone: EST
- Postal code: 21215

Liberty Square is a neighborhood in Baltimore, Maryland. African Americans make up the vast majority of residents.

== Sub-division profile ==
- Median household income: $30,665 (2011)
- Median household rent: $464 (2011)
- Average household size: (2.9 people)
- The majority of residents in this neighborhood have an educational attainment less than a College Bachelor's degree.

== See also ==
- List of Baltimore neighborhoods
