= Hoes Heights, Baltimore =

Hoes Heights
- Neighborhood in Baltimore
- Location within Baltimore
- Coordinates: 39°20′24″N 76°38′12″W
- Country: United States
- State: Maryland
- City: Baltimore
- Named for: Grandison Hoe

Area
  - Land: .079 sq mi (0.20 km^{2})

Population (2010)
  - Total: 790
- ZIP code: 21211

Hoes Heights is an area of North Baltimore, Maryland in zip code 21211, between West Cold Spring Lane and West 41st Street (north-south) and Evans Chapel Road and Falls Road (east-west).

The neighborhood bears the name of Grandison Hoe, a freed slave in Antebellum Baltimore who once owned and operated a farm there.

== See also ==
- List of Baltimore neighborhoods
