= Old Goucher, Baltimore =

Neighborhood in Baltimore

Old Goucher
- Neighborhood of Baltimore
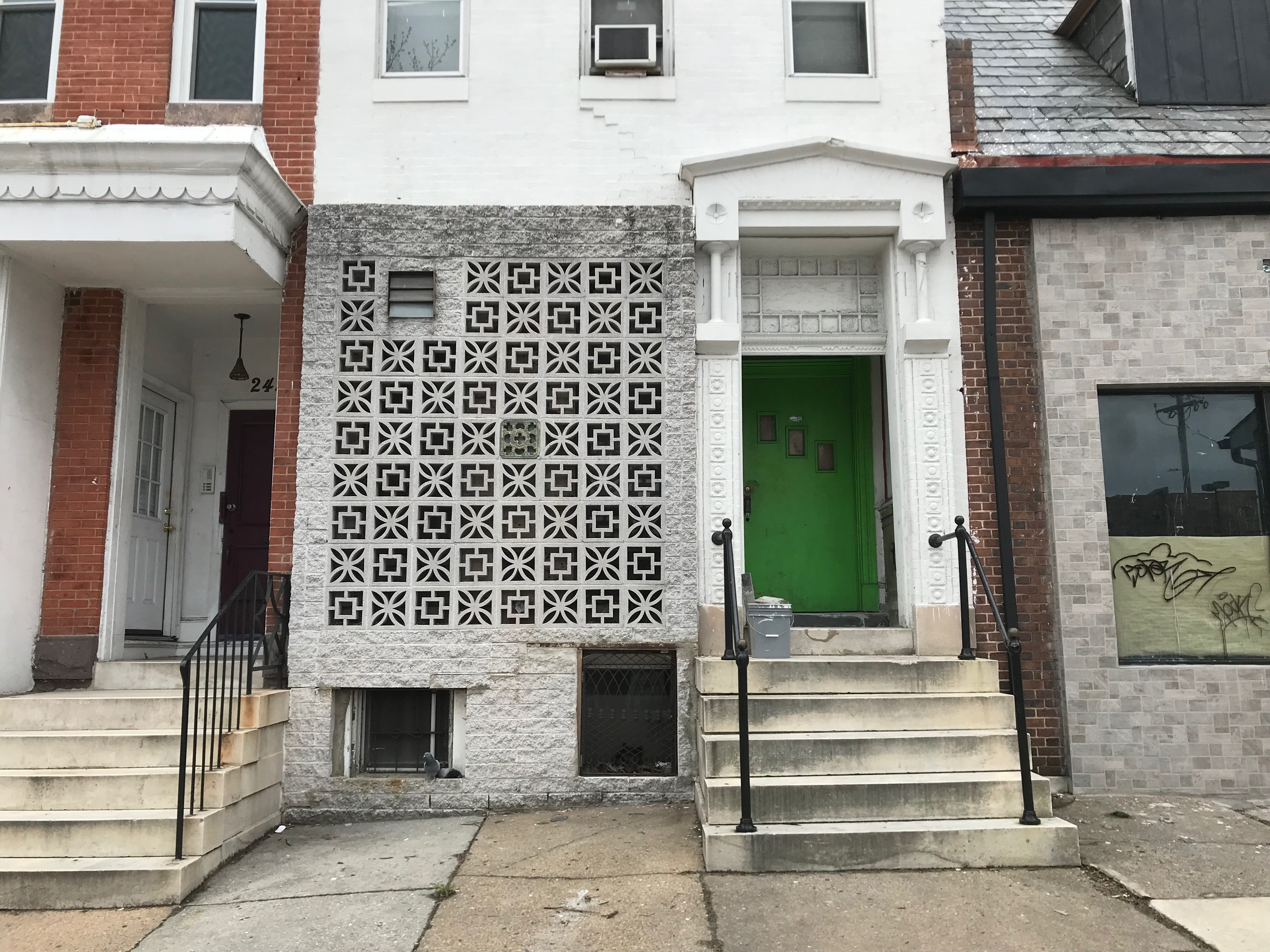
- Buildings on the 2400 block of N. Charles Street in Old Goucher, Baltimore
- Country: United States
- State: Maryland
- City: Baltimore
- Time zone: UTC−5 (Eastern)
  - Summer (DST): UTC−4 (EDT)
- Area Codes: 410, 443, 667

Old Goucher is a neighborhood in north Baltimore, Maryland.

== See also ==
- Old Goucher College Buildings
