= Evergreen, Baltimore =

Coordinates: 39°20.81′N 76°37.81′W

Evergreen
- Neighborhood of Baltimore
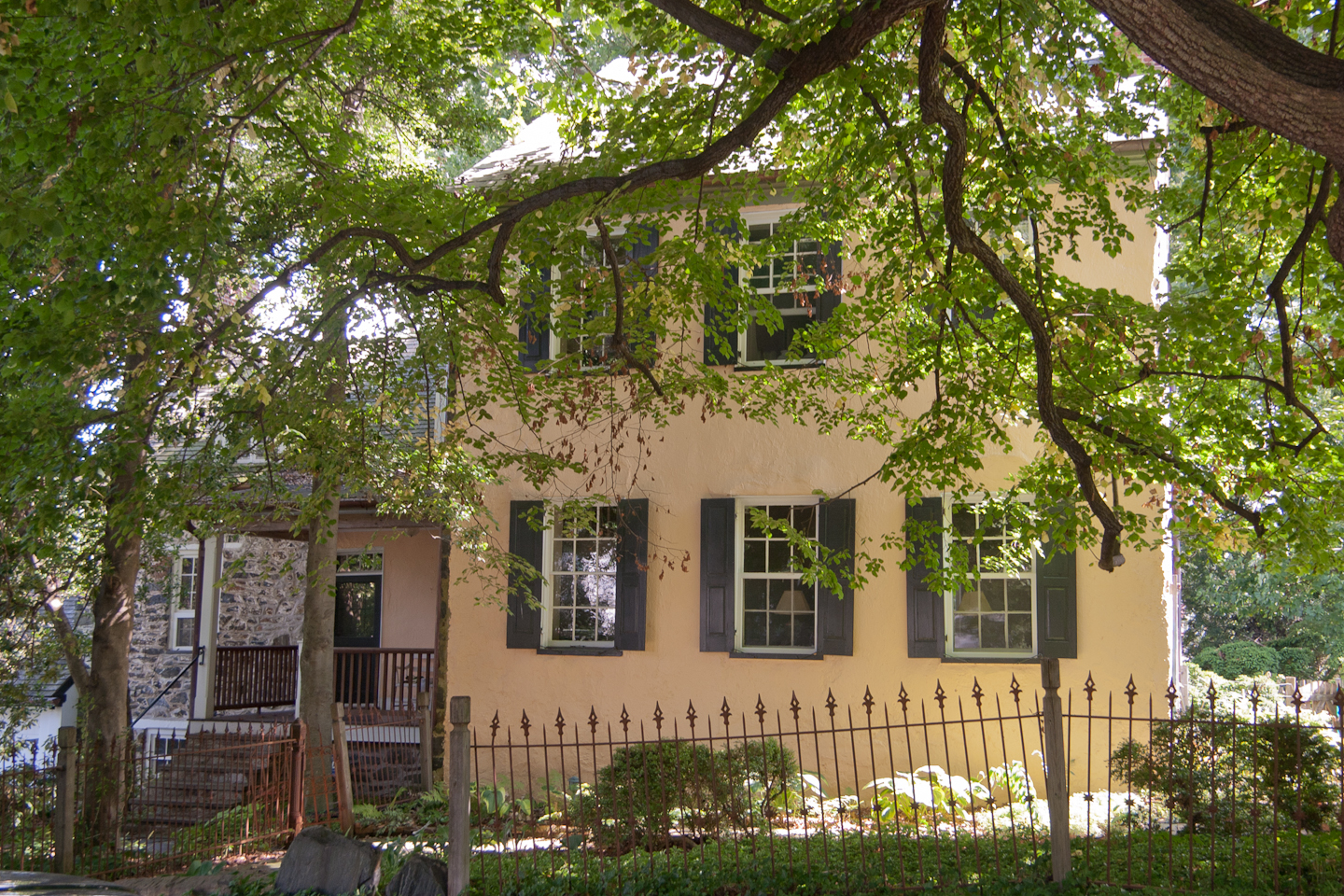
- Cedar Grove in Evergreen, Baltimore

- Location within Baltimore
- Country: United States
- State: Maryland
- City: Baltimore
- Time zone: UTC-5 (Eastern)
  - Summer (DST): EDT
- ZIP code: 21210
- Area code: 410, 443, and 667

Evergreen is a neighborhood in the North District of Baltimore, Maryland. Evergreen's buildings date from the late 19th to early 20th century. It is known as one of the first early non-rowhouse styled suburban communities in Baltimore.

== Boundaries ==
- North–Oakdale Road
- South–Cold Spring Lane
- East–Stony Run Park
- West–Maynadier Road

Zip code–21210

== History ==
The Evergreen neighborhood is located in North Baltimore and was one of the first residential developments in its area, coming even before Roland Park. The land subdivided to become Evergreen was inherited by an heir of the Cockey family in 1813 and was originally called “Ridgely’s Whim.” In 1873, two men named Brooks and Barton purchased the land and began to create a neighborhood called Evergreen for middle-class workers and their families.

The Evergreen is a rare example of an early non-rowhouse suburban-style community. The neighborhood was easily accessible, despite being several miles from the heart of Baltimore. There were two railroad stops on opposite corners of the neighborhood; one was at Cold Spring Lane and one at Oakdale. This connection to the city allowed the neighborhood to grow and thrive. However, neither the railroad nor these stops exist today.

The neighborhood was overwhelmingly composed of hard-working citizens. Many of its residents were builders and tradesmen who worked in Roland Park during its major period of construction from 1895 to 1910. Most of Roland Park's firemen (who were mostly volunteers) ironically lived in the Evergreen neighborhood.

== Demographics ==
According to the 2000 census, the Evergreen neighborhood is made up of 405 residents. It is a predominantly white neighborhood, with 97.5 percent of the people being white. The majority of the residents do not have children under 18 years old living in their households (though there is a considerable upward trend of young children since the census), and the median age is 35 years. About half of the residents are married. The median family income is about $65,000 per year. 43 percent of the residents are single with an average salary of $46,000 per year. Forty of the individuals are below the poverty level, and there are 34 individuals who have not completed high school. However, 195 of the residents have completed college, with 115 stopping at a bachelor's degree and 80 holding a graduate or professional degree. The most common occupations among residents are considered management and professional roles.

== Architecture and design ==
A typical shingle-style house in the Evergreen neighborhood

The 205 houses that make up Evergreen, come in many different architectural styles. Schenley Road, Keswick Road, Wilmslow Road and Evergreen's other smaller streets feature 14-foot-wide (4.3 m) Victorian houses as well as two-story shingle-style houses, 3 1/2-story Queen Anne–style houses and contemporaries.

While Evergreen is mostly composed of residential houses, it also features a neighborhood commercial area on the south boundary at Cold Spring Lane. The neighborhood streets are set up in a grid pattern with alleys. The driveways to the houses—that is, those few that have driveways—are accessible by the alleys. This allows the sidewalks to be unbroken by curb cuts. The houses, which face the street, are surrounded by luscious greenery. Most houses have good-sized yards, well-tended gardens and a variety of trees, shrubs, and bushes. The sidewalks in front of the houses promote communication between residents and allow for a close-knit community.

== See also ==
- List of Baltimore neighborhoods
