= Pulaski Industrial Area, Baltimore =

Neighborhood in Baltimore

Pulaski Industrial Area
- Neighborhood of Baltimore
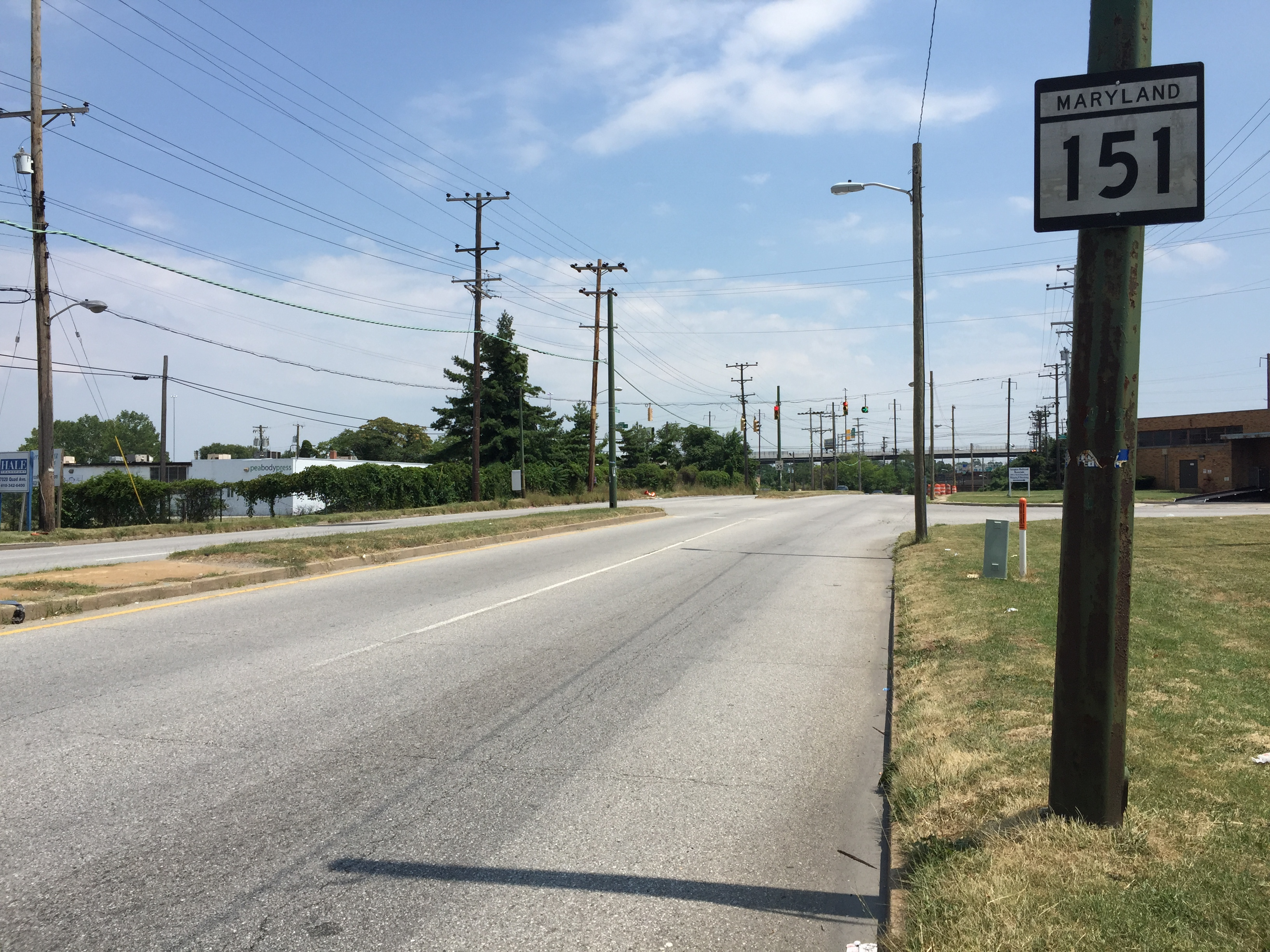
- Intersection of Erdman Avenue and Quad Avenue in Pulaski Industrial Area, Baltimore

- Location within Baltimore Location within Maryland Location within the United States
- Coordinates: 39°18′14″N 76°32′17″W
- Country: United States
- State: Maryland
- City: Baltimore
- Time zone: UTC−5 (Eastern)
  - Summer (DST): UTC−4 (EDT)
- Area Codes: 410, 443, 667

Pulaski Industrial Area is a neighborhood in northeast Baltimore, Maryland.
