= Holabird Industrial Park =

Neighborhood in Maryland, Baltimore

- Neighborhood of Baltimore
- Nickname: Fort Holabird Industrial Park
- Interactive map of Holabird Industrial Park
- Location within Baltimore Location within Maryland Location within the United States
- Coordinates: 39°15′49″N 76°32′9″W
- Country: United States
- State: Maryland
- City: Baltimore
- Time zone: Eastern
  - Summer (DST): EDT
- ZIP codes: 21224
- Area code(s): 410, 443, 667

Holabird Industrial Park is a neighborhood and industrial area in southeast Baltimore, Maryland, United States. It occupies the site of the former Fort Holabird, a U.S. Army post that operated from 1918 to 1973. After the fort was decommissioned, the land was redeveloped into an industrial and commercial park.
