= Barre Circle, Baltimore =

- Barre Circle Historic District
- U.S. National Register of Historic Places
- U.S. Historic district
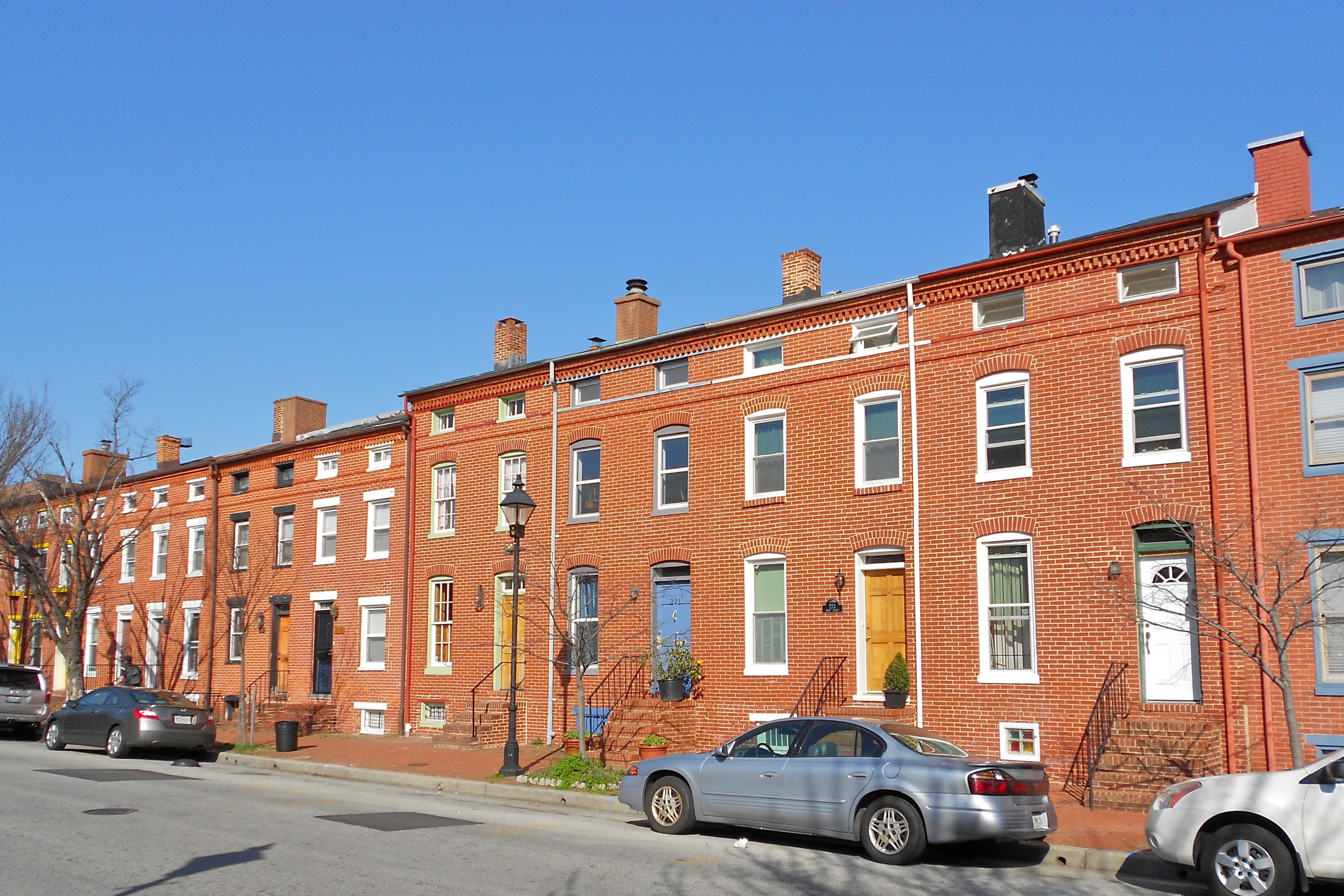
- Rowhouses in March 2012

- Location within Baltimore Location within Maryland Location within the United States
- Location: Roughly bounded by Scott St., Ramsey St., Boyd St., and Harbor City Boulevard./S. Fremont St., Baltimore, Maryland
- Coordinates: 39°17′8″N 76°37′43″W
- Area: 16 acres (6.5 ha)
- Built: 1850
- NRHP reference No.: 83002926
- Added to NRHP: January 10, 1983

Barre Circle is a small neighborhood in Baltimore, Maryland, United States. It is often considered to be a part of Pigtown. Most of the neighborhood's historic homes range from 1840 to 1890, with many populated by graduate students at the nearby University of Maryland's Baltimore campus. It is walking distance to the Inner Harbor and the MARC Train's Camden Station.

According to the LiveBaltimore website, Barre Circle is frequently referred to as "Little Georgetown."

It was listed on the National Register of Historic Places in 1983.
