= Orchard Ridge, Baltimore =

Neighborhood of Baltimore, Maryland

Coordinates: 39°18′47″N 76°33′22.5″W

Orchard Ridge, Baltimore is a neighborhood in the Northeastern part of Baltimore, Maryland, United States. It was formerly known as Claremont-Freedom. The neighborhood was redeveloped as a mixed tenancy, mixed-income community with 461 units. It includes both rental and homeownership townhouses, semi-detached homes, apartments and a community center.

== See also ==
List of Baltimore neighborhoods
