= Radnor-Winston, Baltimore =

- Radnor-Winston Historic District
- U.S. National Register of Historic Places
- U.S. Historic district
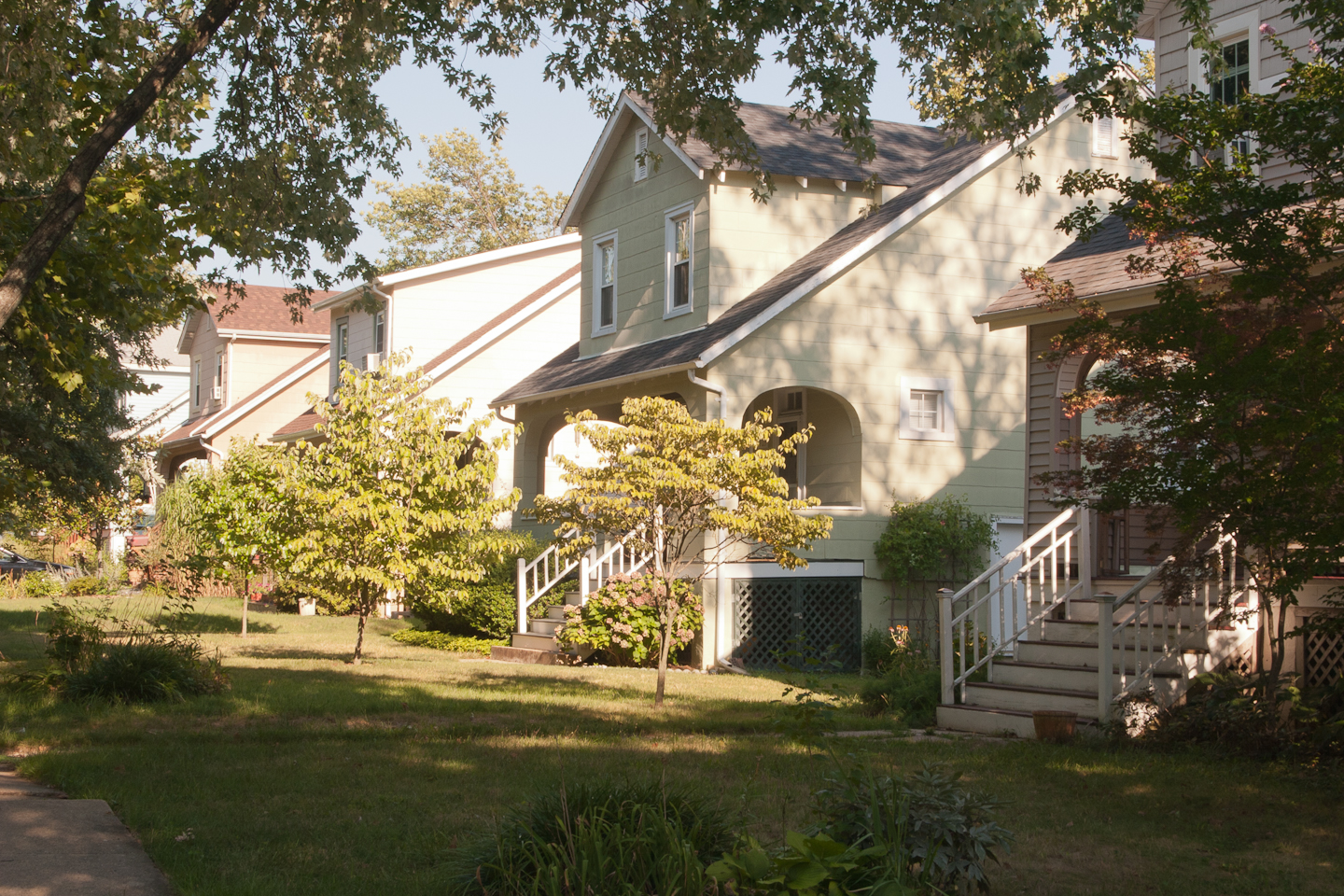
- Houses along Woodford Road, August 2011.

- Location within Baltimore Location within Maryland Location within the United States
- Location: Roughly bounded by Notre Dame Ln., College of Notre Dame, Radnor Ave. and York Rd., Baltimore, Maryland
- Coordinates: 39°21′04″N 76°36′45″W
- Area: 32 acres (13 ha)
- Architect: Wessel, George; et.al.
- Architectural style: Late Victorian, Late 19th And 20th Century Revivals
- NRHP reference No.: 03001327
- Added to NRHP: December 29, 2003

Radnor-Winston is a small community centered near the intersection of York Road and Winston Ave in the North District of Baltimore. Radnor Winston is a friendly, affordable and diverse neighborhood of about 220 homes tucked behind the campuses of Loyola University and The College of Notre Dame. Located in the Roland Park Public School district, the neighborhood is convenient to both downtown Baltimore and Towson.

The housing stock includes a variety of detached and semi-detached homes dating from the turn of the 20th century through the early 1950s, primarily bungalows, cottages and American Foursquares.

The neighborhood was listed on the National Register of Historic Places in 2003.

The Radnor-Winston Improvement Association is a volunteer organization, formed in 1958, with a long history of activism on local issues of concern.

== See also ==
- List of Baltimore neighborhoods
