= LocalLink 38 (BaltimoreLink) =

Bus route in Baltimore

- Westgate - Medfield

Overview
- System: Maryland Transit Administration
- Status: Active
- Predecessors: Route 38

Route
- Locale: Baltimore City
- Communities served: Westgate, Ten Hills, Hunting Ridge, Uplands, Rognel Heights, Allendale, Edmondson Village, Edgewood, Lower Edmondson Village, Gwynns Falls/Leakin Park, Carroll-South Hilton, Franklintown Road, Penrose/Fayette Street Outreach, Mosher, Winchester, Rosemont, Northwest Community Action, Walbrook, Fairmont, Mount Holly, Windsor Hills, West Forest Park, Concerned Citizens of Forest Park, Central Forest Park, Dorchester, Callaway-Garrison, Ashburton, Forest Park, Hanlon-Longwood, Burleith-Leighton, Park Circle, Liberty Square, Druid Hill Park, Woodberry, Greenspring, Parklane, Coldspring, Medfield, Cross Keys, Hoes Heights, Roland Park
- Landmarks served: Baltimore Polytechnic Institute; Western High School

LocalLink 38 is a bus route operated by the Maryland Transit Administration in Baltimore between Westgate and Medfield. Primarily serving high school students traveling to the Baltimore Polytechnic Institute and Western High School campuses, the route was suspended on April 6, 2020, as schools closed during the 2020 coronavirus pandemic. The Maryland Transit Administration announced that the route would remain suspended on September 30, 2020, along with the LocalLink 92, while all other LocalLink routes would continue service. In Fall 2021, as Baltimore City Schools re-opened for in-person instruction, the MTA restored the LocalLink 38 route as a limited service for school trips on weekdays only. The bus departs from North Bend Loop, near the corner of North Bend Road and Edmondson Avenue just outside the western edge of the city border, and terminates at Poly Western High, near the intersection of Cold Spring Lane and Falls Road in north Baltimore, for two morning trips scheduled 5 minutes apart. Two reverse trips also scheduled 5 minutes apart run after school.

== Performance ==
The LocalLink 38 route had the lowest on-time performance out of any route serving Baltimore City Schools during its operation prior to the COVID-19 pandemic. It was on-time for 40% of trips in October 2019, and 45.2% of trips in February 2020.

The MTA defines on-time arrival as within a window from two minutes early to seven minutes late. Before the COVID-19 pandemic, the LocalLink 38 bus was more frequently ahead of schedule than delayed. During the first week of service after reinstatement, from August 30 to September 3, 2021, on-time performance was 47.2%. These trips were late more often than they were early.
