= Harwood, Baltimore =

Coordinates: 39.3200°N 76.6117°W

Harwood
- Neighborhood of Baltimore
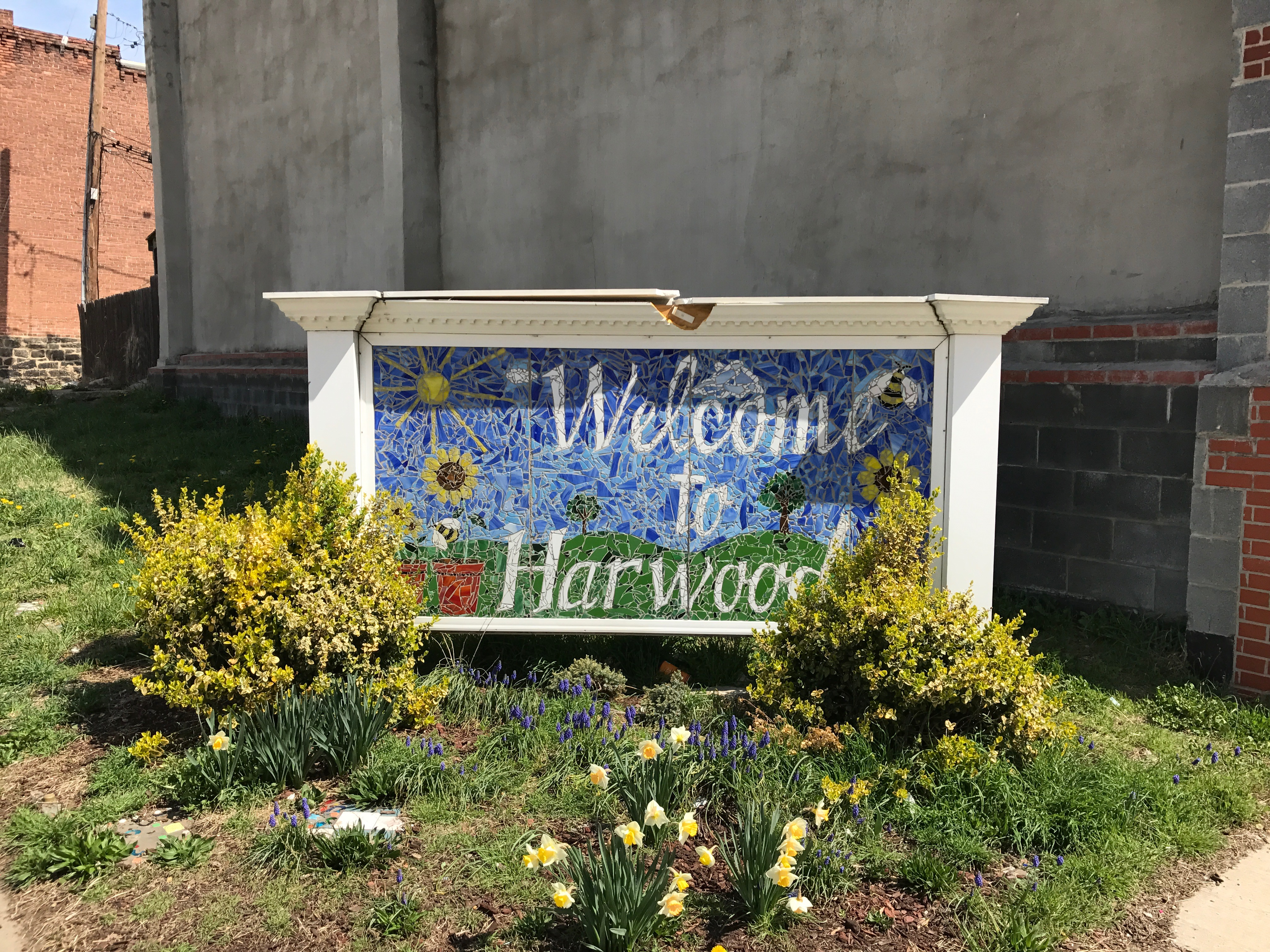
- Harwood neighborhood welcome sign at Barclay and East 25th Streets

- Location within Baltimore
- Country: United States
- State: Maryland
- City: Baltimore
- Time zone: UTC-5 (Eastern)
  - Summer (DST): EDT
- ZIP code: 21218
- Area code: 410, 443, and 667

Harwood is a small neighborhood located in the central area of Baltimore, Maryland, USA. It sits east of Charles Village, south of Abell, west of Waverly and north of Barclay. Its boundaries are Guilford and Greenmount Avenues to the east and west, and 25th and 29th streets to the north and south. These streets together encompass about 14 city blocks.

== History ==
Harwood was originally known as Oxford. In the 1890s, the B&O Railroad constructed the Baltimore Belt Line through the neighborhood. The line was once the main passenger rail line into Baltimore from Philadelphia and New York, and now serves as a major freight route, with several trains passing through each day. The neighborhood's earliest homes were wood-frame detached houses, many of which are on 26th Street, next to the railroad tracks. The majority of homes are brick rowhouses, and most were built between 1900 and 1920.

Harwood was home to many of Baltimore's early professional baseball teams. The original Oriole Park, located at 25th Street and Greenmount Avenue, was home to Baltimore's professional team from 1882 to 1889. The team spent one season at a new ballpark four blocks north, at 29th Street and Greenmount Avenue in the Abell community, before returning to its first home, now christened Union Park, for the 1891 to 1900 seasons. After 1900, Baltimore baseball teams played most of their games at a new stadium at 30th Street and Greenmount Avenue, until Major League Baseball's Orioles began playing at nearby Memorial Stadium in 1954.

== Demographics ==
According to the 2010 Census, Harwood has a population of about 1,575 people, a 12% decline since 2000. As of the census, 75% of residents are black, 21% are white, and 4% are of other races. Approximately 13% of the neighborhood's 749 houses were vacant as of the Census date. Harwood is a small community, encompassing just 45 acres, but has very little undeveloped space, and its population density is approximately 22,400 people per square mile. The community's median household income is approximately $23,873. Approximately 40% of residents are homeowners with 60% of the neighborhood renting their home. As of 2010, the median home sale price in Harwood was $204,000.

== Community layout ==
Harwood consists primarily of brick rowhouses along mostly east-west streets. Barclay Street, a north-south thoroughfare the divides the neighborhood in half, also creates divisions in housing style. Most houses west of Barclay Street have large, covered porches, while most of those east of it boast only stoops. Homes fronting Guilford Avenue, on the neighborhood's western edge, tend to be larger and more expensive than most of the rest of the neighborhood. There are a few scattered businesses along the 25th Street and Greenmount Avenue boundaries of the community. The Baltimore Belt Line (a freight train line operated by CSX) runs below grade along 26th Street and creates noticeable noise and vibrations each time a train passes. Harwood has two small neighborhood parks and a community garden.

== Transportation ==
As a dense urban neighborhood, many amenities are available in surrounding communities and are a short walk away. With a WalkScore of 91, Harwood is considered a "Walker's Paradise" by Walkscore.com. According to the website, the neighborhood is the 15th "most walkable" neighborhood in Baltimore. Harwood is located on the 8 and 12 bus routes, operated by the Maryland Transit Administration, and is a couple blocks from the MTA's Red, Silver and 51 routes, as well as a shuttle operated by Johns Hopkins University. Guilford Avenue, Harwood's western boundary, is the city's only designated "bike boulevard," with traffic calming designed to encourage bicycling along the corridor, which connects Charles Village with the downtown area.

== Revitalization ==
Harwood's population declined steadily in the latter half of the 20th century and early 21st century due to white flight, petty crime, drug dealing, drug abuse, and other social ills that negatively affected the neighborhood. However, several revitalization efforts are underway to help the community rebound. Harwood is part of Baltimore's Healthy Neighborhoods program, which offers special loans on designated target blocks within the community. Residents have won grants to complete substantial neighborhood beautification projects in recent years. One of the most notable projects includes mosaic house numbers, mailboxes and signs throughout the neighborhood. The community's main welcome sign, located at 25th Street and Barclay Street, is made of mosaics, as are the majority of house numbers on the 300 blocks of 26th Street, East Lorraine Avenue and 27th Street. The artist, who lives in Harwood, has also completed a decorative mosaic mural over the entrance to The Barclay School, one of the neighborhood's public schools, and most recently another large sign for the neighborhoods 29th Street Community Center.

Other small development projects are underway. In 2011 and 2012, 30 Harwood residents participated in the Charles Village Painted Ladies Contest, an occasional project to add vibrant color to the fronts of houses. In 2012, an arts collective called Brickhaus was started on Greenmount Avenue, converting a vacant warehouse in 16 artist studios with exhibition and recording space. In 2013, two developers who own a large number of vacant homes in the community were awarded a $500,000 grant from the State of Maryland to complete at least 18 renovations, mostly on Whitridge Avenue and East Lorraine Avenue. Also in 2013, the City's former Barclay Recreation Center, which had been shuttered, was reopened as a community center.

== Schools ==
Harwood's public school students attend one of two public schools that serve the neighborhood, Margaret Brent Elementary/Middle School and The Barclay School. Both schools offer pre-Kindergarten through 8th grade education. Both schools are part of the Great Schools Charles Village initiative, a partnership between the two schools and Loyola University Maryland that seeks to create a stronger educational environment. The partnership works with Baltimore City Public Schools and advocacy groups like The Village Parents on issues like curriculum changes, parent engagement, enrollment and teacher training and retention.
