= O'Donnell Heights, Baltimore =

Neighborhood located in Baltimore, Maryland, United States

Coordinates: 39°16′43″N 76°32′26″W

O'Donnell Heights is a neighborhood named for a public housing development in the far southeastern part of the city of Baltimore, Maryland, United States. It is located south and east of Interstate 95, just west of the border with Baltimore County, and north of the St. Helena neighborhood.

The community was built to house factory workers during World War II. Today operated by the Housing Authority of Baltimore City, the original 900 unit development was modernized in 1983. The neighborhood, which also contains privately owned and rented rowhouses, is separated from Highlandtown by highways, cemeteries, and industrial areas. It is in close proximity to the Point Breeze Industrial Park and Johns Hopkins Bayview Medical Center.

Graceland Park O'Donnell Heights Elementary School #240 is located at Gusryan and O'Donnell Streets.

As of May 2007, many of the World War II era public housing buildings in O'Donnell Heights have started a demolition phase as a means of making room for a brand new mixed-income housing area. O'Donnell Heights is predominantly African American, with growing White and Hispanic populations as well, according to the 2010 Census.

Notable former resident Dominique Wilkins went on to gain fame in the N.B.A., and returned to his neighborhood to build a basketball court for the community in the early 1980s.
