= Madison Park, Baltimore =

Neighborhood in Baltimore

Madison Park
- Neighborhood of Baltimore
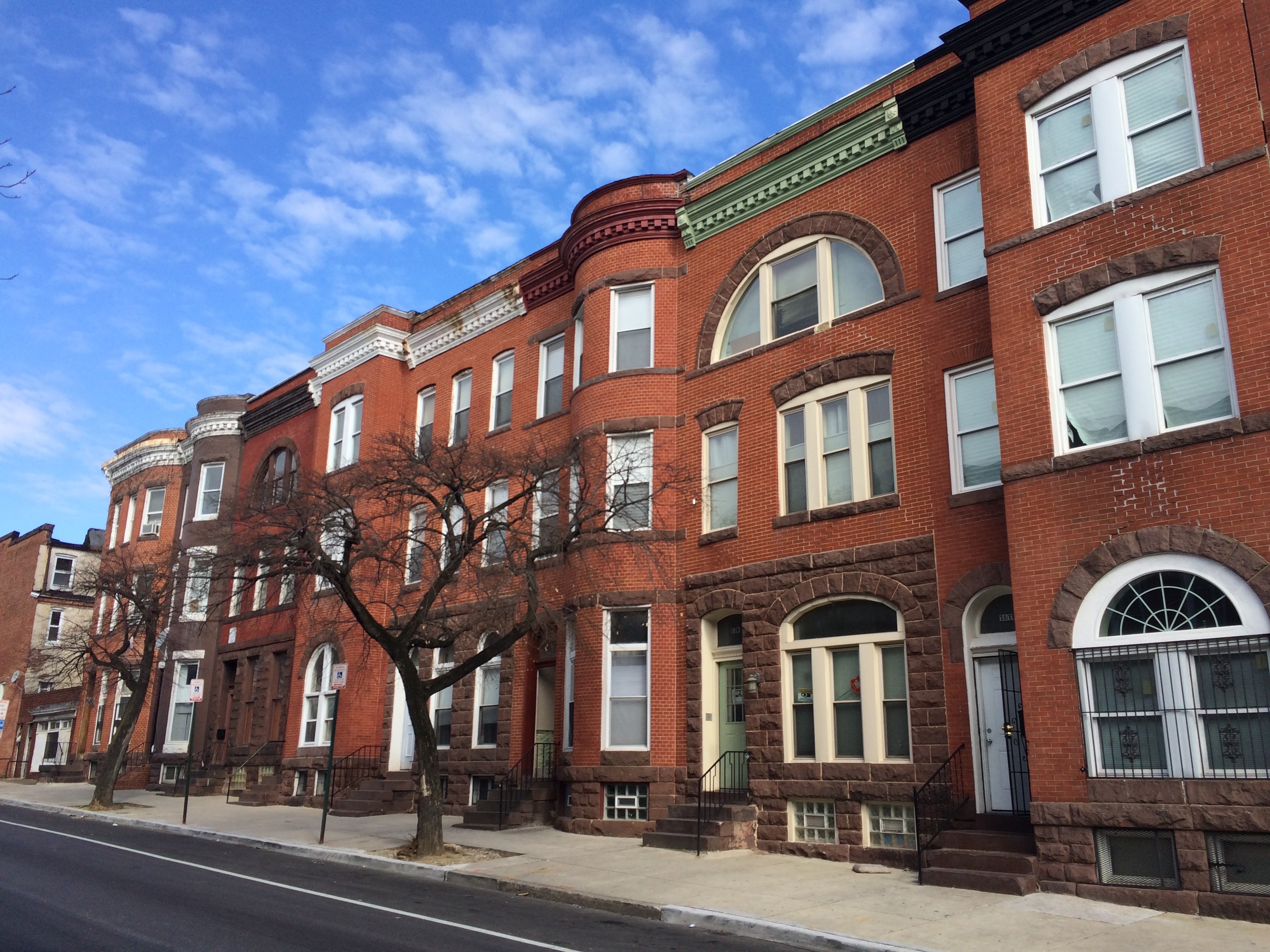
- Rowhouses on the northeast side of the 1800 block of McCulloh Street in Madison Park, Baltimore
- Interactive map of Madison Park
- Location within Baltimore Location within Maryland Location within the United States
- Coordinates: 39.3041°N 76.6277°W
- Country: United States
- State: Maryland
- City: Baltimore
- City Council: District 11

Area
  - Total: 0.1584 sq mi (0.410 km^{2})

Population (2010)
  - Total: 2,134
  - Density: 13,474/sq mi (5,202/km^{2})
- Time zone: UTC−5 (Eastern)
  - Summer (DST): UTC−4 (EDT)
- ZIP Codes: 21217, 21201
- Area Codes: 410, 443, 667

Madison Park is a neighborhood in west Baltimore.

== Geography ==
Madison Park is bounded by North Avenue to the north, Martin Luther King Boulevard to the south, Eutaw Place and Dolphin Street to the east, and McCulloh Street and Madison Avenue to the west. Adjacent neighborhoods are Reservoir Hill (north), Mount Vernon (south), Seton Hill (south), Bolton Hill (east), Mid-Town Belvedere (east), Upton (west), and Druid Heights (west).

== See also ==
- State Center / Cultural Center station
- Cecil Apartments
