= Forest Park, Baltimore =

Coordinates: 39.363236°N 76.688862°W

Forest Park
- Neighborhood of Baltimore
- Forest Park Branch of the Enoch Pratt Free Library

- Location within Baltimore
- Country: United States
- State: Maryland
- City: Baltimore
- Elevation: 390 ft (120 m)

Population
  - Estimate (2019): 1,374
- Time zone: UTC-5 (Eastern)
  - Summer (DST): UTC-4 (EDT)
- ZIP code: 21216
- Area code: 410, 443, and 667

Forest Park (and Howard Park) is a region of Northwest Baltimore, Maryland located west of Reisterstown Road, south of Northern Parkway, and east of the Baltimore City/County line. In Baltimore, the region is referred to by locals simply as "Forest Park" and includes the neighborhoods of Ashburton, Callaway-Garrison, Central Forest Park, Dolfield, Dorchester, East Arlington, Forest Park, Grove Park, Hanlon Longwood, Howard Park, Garwyn Oaks, Purnell, West Arlington, West Forest Park, and Windsor Hills.

Originally developed as suburban-type residential housing in close proximity to the streecar network, it is an economically diverse area that was once the center of Baltimore's Jewish community as it moved from downtown. During the Vietnam War era, however, the area experienced white flight, while it was 95% White in 1960, it became 95% Black in 1970. It is now an almost exclusively African American region of Baltimore. The neighborhoods in Forest Park and Howard Park are varied. Some have suffered urban decay and crime related to the city's job losses, while many continue to be suburban and upper-middle-class neighborhoods with large Colonial-style homes built in the 1920s. Ashburton, for instance, is the home of former city mayor Catherine Pugh, as well as past mayor Kurt Schmoke and other prominent African-American political leaders.

== Schools ==
Dorchester is home to Forest Park High School, which boasted alumni such as Spiro T. Agnew and Margaret Hayes.

== Parks and recreation ==
Forest Park is home to Hillsdale, Hanlon, and Powder Mill parks in addition to the Forest Park Golf Course. It is also within proximity of the Baltimore Zoo and Druid Hill Park.

== Gwynn Oak ==
The area in Baltimore County near Forest Park is known as Gwynn Oak and is located directly west of the Baltimore city line.

== Roads ==
=== Garrison Avenue/Garrison Boulevard ===
Garrison Avenue starts as a one-way street from Greenspring Avenue, changes to Garrison Boulevard after Wabash Avenue, then makes a slight left after passing Liberty Heights Avenue (known as MD-26) to Clifton Avenue.

=== Berwyn Avenue ===
Berwyn Avenue is a street from Liberty Heights Avenue to Garrison Boulevard, and a little street to the other side of Liberty Heights Avenue.

=== Forest Park Avenue ===
This street runs from Garrison Boulevard to Security Boulevard (crossing Baltimore County line) then splits off to Forest Park Avenue with a traffic light across from I-70, and ends at St. Agnes Lane.

== See also ==
- List of Baltimore neighborhoods
