= Pimlico Road =

Pimlico Road may refer to:

- Pimlico Road, London, a road in Belgravia, London, UK
- List of streets in Baltimore#Pimlico Road, a road in Baltimore, Maryland, USA
