= Building at 409 West Baltimore Street =

Historic building in Maryland, USA

- U.S. National Register of Historic Places
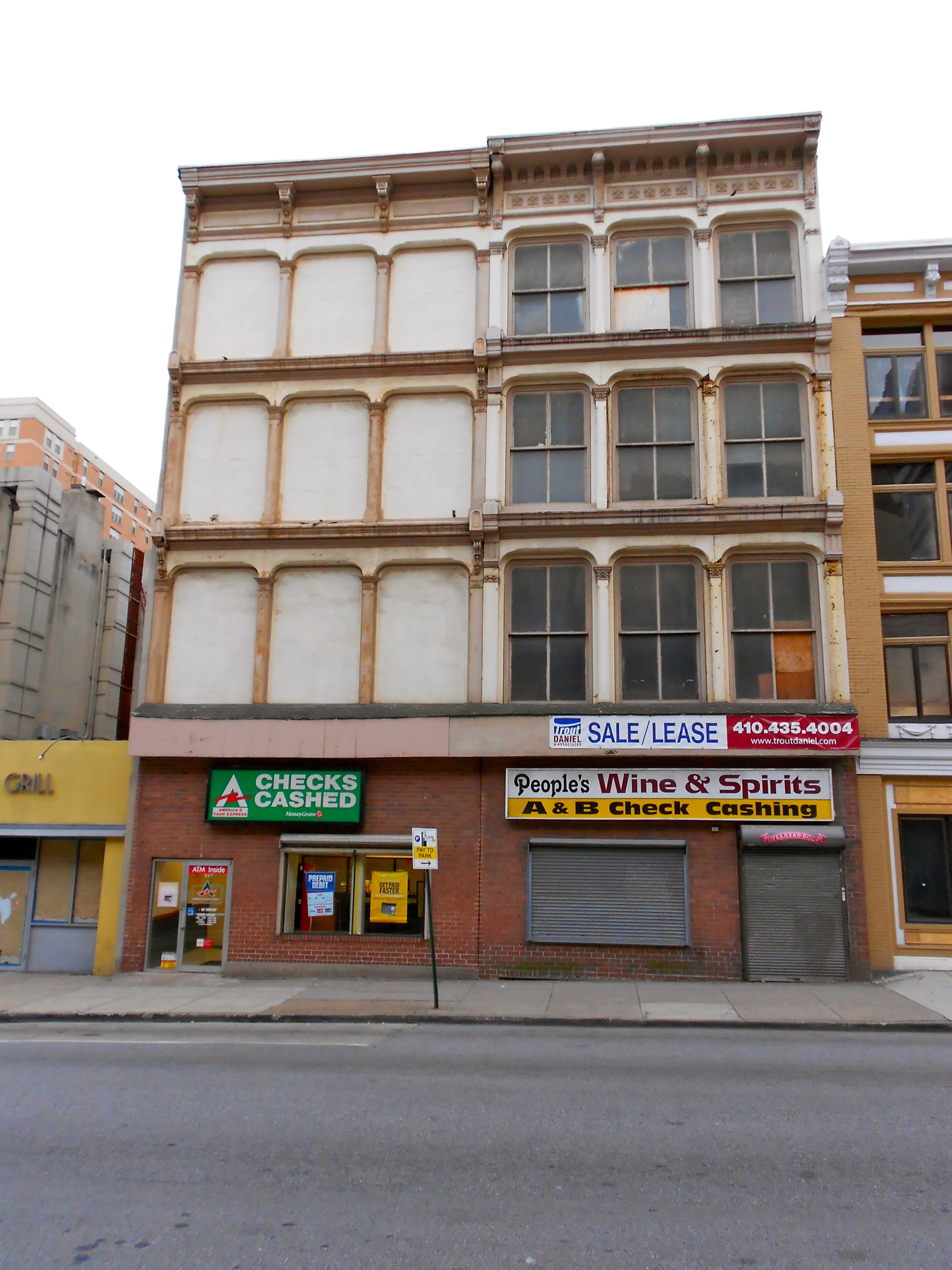
- 409 West Baltimore Avenue on the right

- Location within Baltimore Location within Maryland Location within the United States
- Location: 409 W. Baltimore St., Baltimore, Maryland
- Coordinates: 39°17′21.1″N 76°37′17.2″W
- Area: less than one acre
- Built: 1875
- Architectural style: Italianate
- MPS: Cast Iron Architecture of Baltimore MPS
- NRHP reference No.: 94001395
- Added to NRHP: December 1, 1994

Building at 409 West Baltimore Street, also known as the N. Hess & Bro. Building, is a historic retail and wholesale building located at Baltimore, Maryland, United States. It is a four-story brick commercial building with a cast-iron façade above an altered storefront, erected about 1875. Built originally for a wholesale grocery company, it was subsequently occupied by a boot and shoe factory, and a series of wholesale and retail dry goods or clothing stores.

The building at 409 West Baltimore Street was listed on the National Register of Historic Places in 1994. The building next door at 407 West Baltimore, the L. Frank & Son Building, was listed at the same time.
