= Edgecomb, Baltimore =

Edgecomb
- neighborhood statistical area
- Location within Baltimore
- Coordinates: 39.342662°N 76.663156°W
- Country: United States
- State: Maryland
- City: Baltimore

Area
  - Total: 0.16 sq mi (0.41 km^{2})
  - Land: 0.16 sq mi (0.41 km^{2})

Population (2009)
  - Total: 2,099
  - Density: 13,000/sq mi (5,100/km^{2})
- Time zone: UTC-5 (Eastern)
  - Summer (DST): UTC-4 (EDT)
- ZIP code: 21215
- Area code: 410, 443, and 667

Edgecomb, also known as Parklane, is a neighborhood in the North District of Baltimore, located between the neighborhoods of Cylburn (north) and Greenspring (south). Its boundaries are marked by Dupont Avenue (north), Coldspring Lane (south), Pimlico Road (west) and Greenspring Avenue (east). Central Park Heights, is located on the opposite side of Pimlico Road in the Northwest District. The neighborhood of Coldspring is located to Edgecomb's east, across Greenspring Avenue.

== History ==
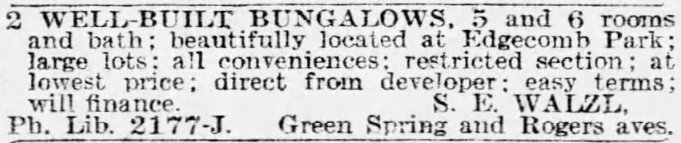
A 1920 advertisement for racially restricted houses in Edgecomb.

Prior to the passage of the Fair Housing Act of 1968, racial covenants were used in Baltimore to exclude African-Americans and other minorities. A 1920 Baltimore Sun advertisement for houses sold by S. E. Walzl refers to a racially "restricted section" of Edgecomb.

== Public services ==
=== Parks and recreation ===
- Edgecombe Park, located within Edgecombe Circle
- Pall Mall Playground, located between Pimlico Avenue (west) and Pall Mall Road (east)
- James D. Gross Recreation Center, located at 4600 Lanier Avenue, was originally the Edgecombe Circle Recreation Center when it was built in 1969. The recreation center was renamed in memory of James D. Gross on April 15, 1976.

=== Public schools ===
Edgecombe Circle Elementary School, located at 2835 Virginia Avenue, had 513 students enrolled in Pre-K through 5th grade, with 37 teachers, during 2010.

=== Public transportation ===
MTA CityLink Navy, providing bus service between Sinai Hospital (north) and Fort McHenry (south), stops along Greenspring Avenue, the east boundary of Edgecomb. The route's course to Downtown Baltimore includes a stop at the Mondawmin Metro station.

MTA LocalLink 28, traveling between the Rogers Avenue Metro station (west) and the neighborhood of Moravia (east) in Baltimore County, serves Edgecomb along Cold Spring Lane.

== Demographics ==
The neighborhood's population, estimated at 2,099 in 2009, was almost exclusively black. Median household income for Edgecomb was $35,091 in 2009, somewhat below the citywide median of $38,772. Residents living below the poverty level were 22.0 percent of Edgewood's population, only slightly better than the city ratio of 22.9 percent.

== See also ==
List of Baltimore neighborhoods
