= Mary Tabor =

American novelist

Mary L. Tabor
- Born: March 3, 1946 (age 80); Baltimore, Maryland, U.S.
- Occupation: Author
- Writing career
- Period: 1987–present
- Genre: Literary fiction
- Website: www.maryltabor.com

Mary L. Tabor (born March 3, 1946) is an American author of literary fiction, professor, radio show host, and columnist.

== Early life and education ==
Mary Tabor was born on March 3, 1946, in Baltimore, Maryland, and graduated from Forest Park High School in 1962. She later attended University of Maryland and graduated Phi Beta Kappa with a B.A. in English in 1966. She later obtained MAT in English and education in 1967 from Oberlin College. Tabor obtained her MFA in 1999 from Ohio State University.

== Working career ==
In 1980, Tabor was a manager, writer, and Editor-in-chief for the American Petroleum Institute. She was promoted to the director of public affairs of the API in 1989 and was in this position until 1996.

Tabor was a visiting professor of English at the University of Missouri during 2006–2007. She was an adjunct professor in English at George Washington University from 1999 through 2010. Since 2008, Tabor has been a Woodrow Wilson Visiting Fellow.

== Writing career ==
Tabor's first memoir piece was published in The New York Jewish Week in 1987 and she published literary memoir and short fiction pieces regularly in literary magazines. She published her first book of fiction The Woman Who Never Cooked at the age of 60. In 2011, she published her memoir, (Re)Making Love and won the 2014 Watty award for Best of Interactive Storytelling.

In 2013, Tabor published her first novel, Who By Fire, which won the Notable Indie award for best books of 2013 by online magazine Shelf Unbound.

Mary L. Tabor is a member of the Authors Guild.

== Personal ==
Since retiring from George Washington University, Tabor has been teaching select students across the world, one-on-one. She currently lives in Hyde Park, Chicago with her husband.

== Bibliography ==
=== Short stories ===
- Woman Who Never Cooked: Stories (2006)

=== Memoir ===
- (Re)MAKING LOVE: a sex after sixty story (2011)

=== Novels ===
- Who by Fire (2012)

== Awards ==
- Winner 2004 Mid-List First Series Award for Short Fiction
- Grand Prize, Santa Fe Writers Project 2000 Literary Awards, August 2000
- Semi-finalist, Lewis-Clark Press Discovery and Expedition Awards, 2004.
- Honorable Mention, Starcherone Books Fiction Prize, 2004–05.
- One of six semi-finalists, John Simmons Iowa Short Fiction Award, 2003.
- Finalist for the 2003 Spokane Prize for Short Fiction, EWU Press, September 2003.
- Finalist for the 2002, Mid-List Series Award for Short Fiction June 2003.
- One of six semi-finalists for the 2002 Katherine Anne Porter Prize in short fiction.
- One of six semi-finalists for the 2000 Iowa Short Fiction Contest.
