= Levindale, Baltimore =

Neighborhood in Baltimore, United States

Levindale
- Neighborhood of Baltimore
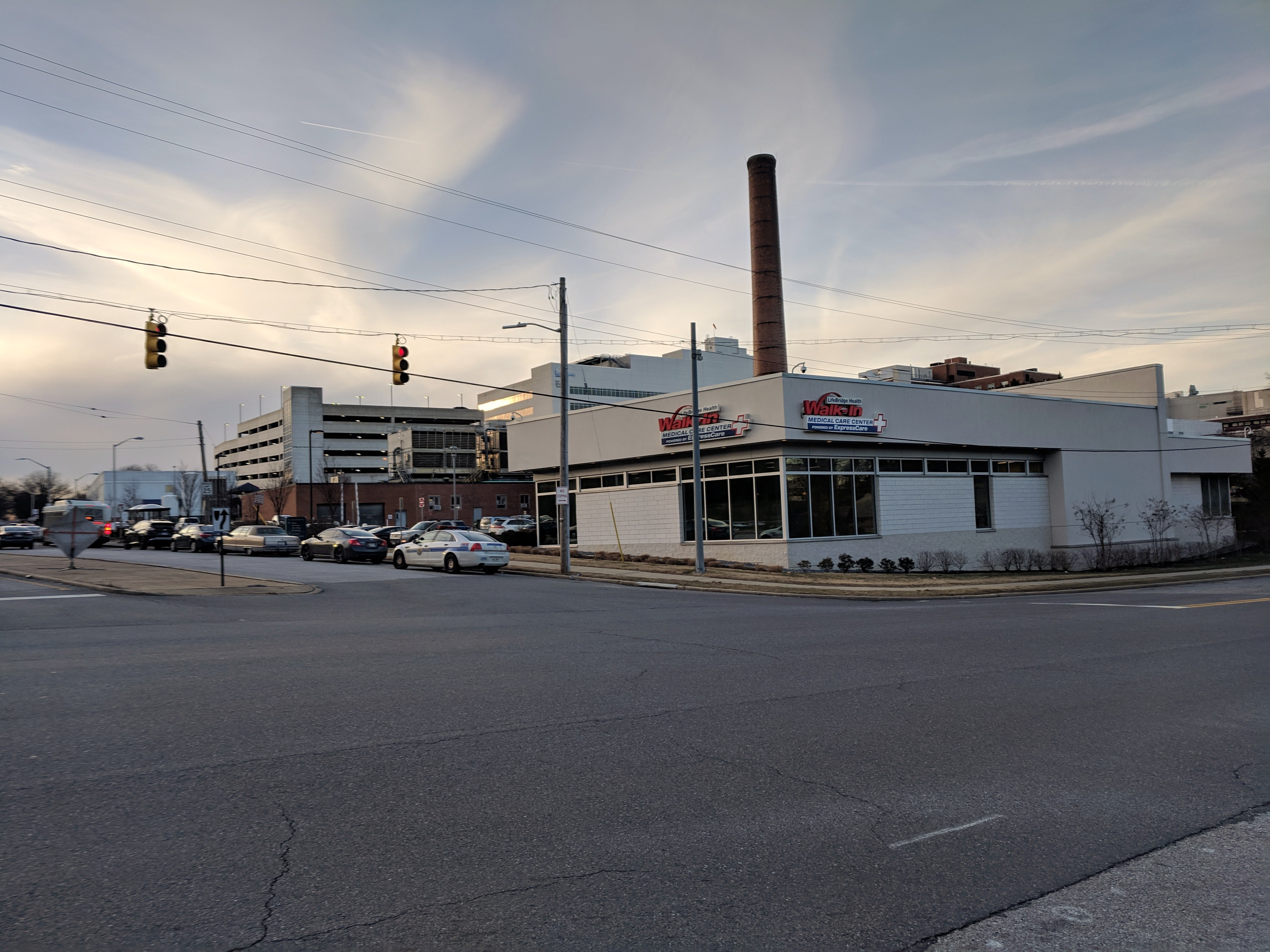
- ExpressCare and Sinai Hospital in Levindale, Baltimore

- Location within Baltimore Location within Maryland Location within the United States
- Coordinates: 39.3525°N 76.6652°W
- Country: United States
- State: Maryland
- City: Baltimore
- City Council: District 6

Area
  - Total: 0.1488 sq mi (0.385 km^{2})

Population (2010)
  - Total: 1,218
  - Density: 8,186/sq mi (3,161/km^{2})
- Time zone: UTC−5 (Eastern)
  - Summer (DST): UTC−4 (EDT)
- ZIP Codes: 21215
- Area Codes: 410, 443, 667

Levindale is a neighborhood in northwest Baltimore which includes Sinai Hospital, the Levindale Hebrew Geriatric Center and Hospital, and a small number of detached homes and apartment buildings towards its south.

The Levindale-Sunset Community Association is an organizational body for residents of the area, which is often described in conjunction with the nearby communities of Cylburn, Park Heights, Pimlico, Arlington, and Hilltop due to its small size.

== Geography ==
Levindale is bounded by Cylburn Avenue to the south, West Northern Parkway to the north, Greenspring Road to the east, Pimlico Road to the southwest and Preakness Way to the northwest. Adjacent neighborhoods are Mount Washington (north), Cylburn (south), Coldspring (east), Central Park Heights (southwest), and Pimlico Good Neighbors (northwest).

== History ==
After the Hebrew Orphan Asylum building in West Baltimore was deemed unfit for children in 1920, the orphanage was moved to Levindale. The new Levindale Orphanage was met with protest from social works who warned that child care trends were shifting away from orphanages toward the foster care model. The orphanage closed in 1923, and the building became a home for the elderly which continues to operate today, the Levindale Hebrew Geriatric Center and Hospital.
