= Dorchester, Baltimore =

Dorchester
- neighborhood statistical area
- Location within Baltimore
- Coordinates: 39.327065°N 76.677145°W
- Country: United States
- State: Maryland
- City: Baltimore

Area
  - Total: 0.24 sq mi (0.62 km^{2})
  - Land: 0.24 sq mi (0.62 km^{2})

Population (2008)
  - Total: 1,782
  - Density: 7,400/sq mi (2,900/km^{2})
- Time zone: UTC-5 (Eastern)
  - Summer (DST): UTC-4 (EDT)
- ZIP code: 21207 and 21215
- Area code: 410, 443, and 667

Dorchester is a neighborhood in the Northwest District of Baltimore. It is located between the neighborhoods of Arlington (north), Central Forest Park (south), Howard Park (west) and Gallway-Garrison (east). Maryland Route 26 (Liberty Heights Avenue) draws the boundary between Dorchester and Central Forest Park. Dorchester's other boundaries are marked by Oakford Avenue, Eldorado Avenue and Garrison Boulevard.

MTA CitiLink Lime and MTA LocalLink 82 (Mondawmin Metro Shuttle Bug) provide service along Liberty Heights Avenue, connecting with the Metro Subway at Mondawmin station. MTA LocalLink 80 runs along Garrison Boulevard, providing service between Sinai Hospital (north) and Downtown Baltimore (south).

Two public schools are located in the Dorchester neighborhood: Garrison Middle School, at 3910 Barrington Road, and Forest Park High School, at 3701 Eldorado Avenue.

== Demographics ==
A study by the Baltimore City Health Department in 2008 reported that Dorchester residents were 97% African-American, compared with a city average of 64%. Infant mortality for Dorchester, at 11.4 per thousand, was slightly below the city average of 11.7, but life expectancy of the neighborhood's residents, at 70.2 years, was somewhat shorter than the city average of 70.9 years.

=== Dorchester age ranges ===
Age range	Pct
under 18	24%
18-24	8%
25-64	50%
over 64	18%

=== Household income ===
Dorchester had a median household income of $31,441 in 2008. However, household incomes producing this median varied widely, with the following ranges reported:

Household income	Pct
Less than $25,000	41%
$25,000 - $40,000	20%
$40,000 - $75,000	27%
over $75,000	13%

== See also ==
- List of Baltimore neighborhoods
