= Celeste Ulrich =

American educator (1924–2011)

Celeste Ulrich (August 24, 1924 – August 4, 2011) was an American educator and leader in the field of physical education.

== Education ==
Ulrich was born in Baltimore, Maryland, in 1924, and attended Forest Park High School. Her lifelong friends included jewelry designer Betty Cooke and physician Dr. Miriam Shamer Daly who described one of their adventures in her memoirs, Doctor Miriam. She received a Bachelor of Science from Woman's College, now the University of North Carolina at Greensboro, in 1946, and continued her education at the University of North Carolina at Chapel Hill, receiving a master's degree in 1947. She earned a PhD from the University of Southern California in 1956.

== Career ==
Ulrich was a professor at Madison College, now James Madison University, from 1947 to 1956. She then returned to Woman's College and began teaching in the School of Health, Physical Education, and Recreation. In 1979, Ulrich took a professorship at the University of Oregon, going on to serve as Dean of the College of Human Development and Performance until her retirement in 1990.

She also coached women's basketball at Madison College.

== Contributions ==
Ulrich worked extensively to promote physical education and sport. She was involved in a number of professional associations and served on many committees. She was the Vice President of the American Alliance for Health, Physical Education, Recreation, and Dance (AAHPERD), Chairwoman of the Physical Education Division, and later served as president of the organization from 1976 to 1977. She also served a term as President of the National Association for Physical Education of College Women. During her term she established the Amy Morris Homans Lecture and the journal Quest. APPHERD awarded her the Luther Halsey Gulick Award in 1983. Ulrich established an endowment to provide recognition for professional service activities by faculty members of the University of North Carolina Department of Exercise and Sports Science.

Ulrich died in August 2011.
