= Cylburn, Baltimore =

Cylburn
- Neighborhood of Baltimore
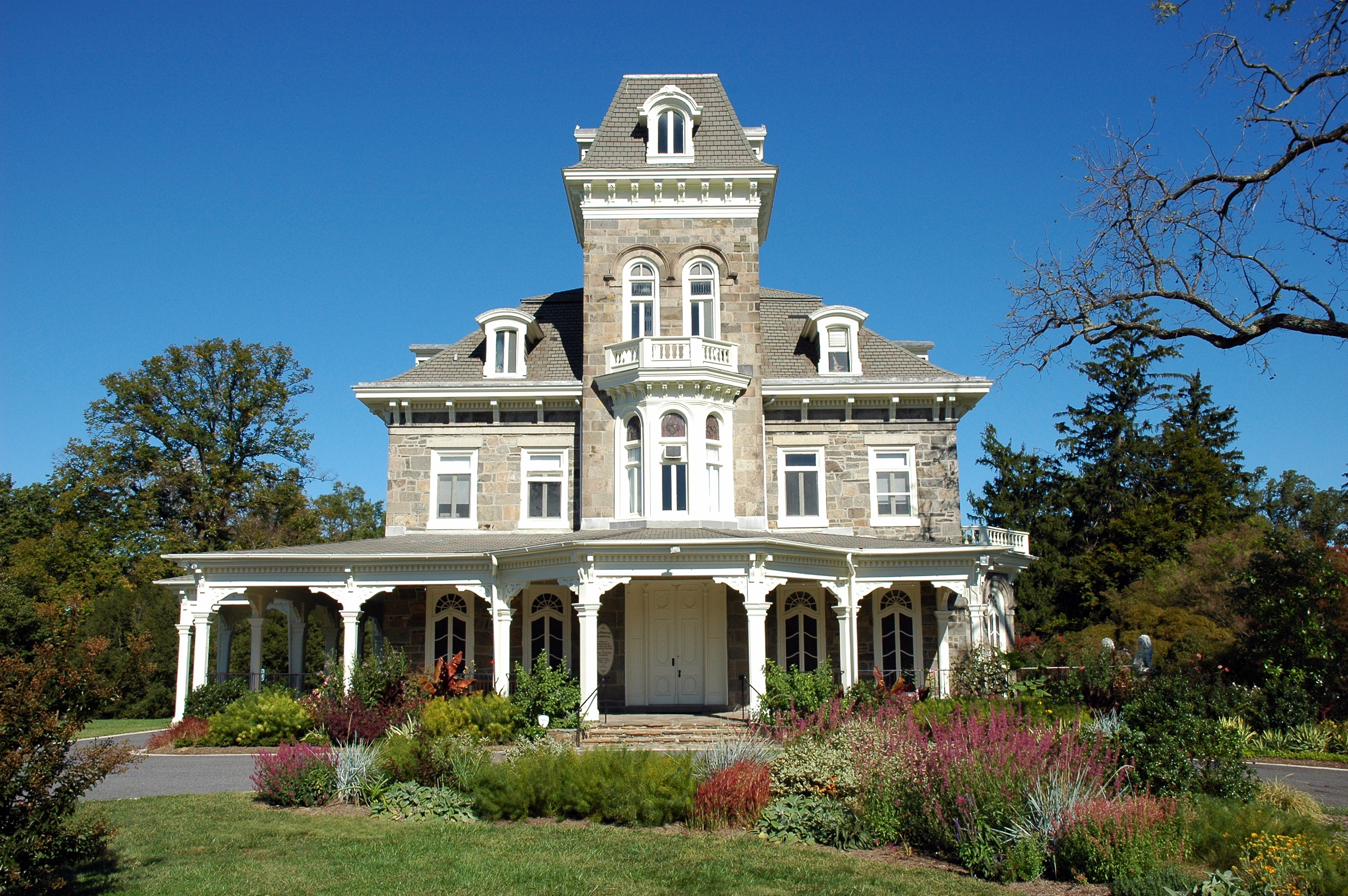
- Cylburn Mansion from the front

- Location within Baltimore
- Coordinates: 39.348104°N 76.663799°W
- Country: United States
- State: Maryland
- City: Baltimore

Area
  - Total: 0.284 sq mi (0.74 km^{2})
  - Land: 0.284 sq mi (0.74 km^{2})

Population (2009)
  - Total: 2,639
  - Density: 9,290/sq mi (3,590/km^{2})
- Time zone: UTC-5 (Eastern)
  - Summer (DST): UTC-4 (EDT)
- ZIP code: 21209, 21215
- Area code: 410, 443, and 667

Cylburn is a neighborhood in the North District of Baltimore, located between the neighborhoods of Levindale (north) and Edgecomb (south). Its boundaries are marked by Cylburn Avenue (north), Dupont Avenue (south), Pimlico Road (west) and Greenspring Avenue (east). Central Park Heights, is located on the opposite side of Pimlico Road in the northwest area of Baltimore City. Cylburn Arboretum (old Elisha Tyson mansion and estate off Greenspring Avenue) and the neighborhood of Cold Spring are located to Cylburn's east, across Greenspring Avenue. The heavily wooded property with its historic mansion and grounds, walking trails, famous collections and gardens overlook the Jones Falls Valley with the Jones Falls Expressway (Interstate 83) further to the east.

== Public services ==
=== Public schools ===
Pimlico Elementary School, located at 4849 Pimlico Road, had 657 students enrolled in Pre-K through 5th grade, with 44 teachers during 2010. Its students were almost exclusively black, with a single white child enrolled in the third grade and no children from other ethnic groups. Free and reduced price lunches were provided by the National School Lunch Program for 585 of the school's students.

=== Public transportation ===
MTA CityLink Navy), providing bus service between Sinai Hospital (northwest) and Fort McHenry (south), stops along Greenspring Avenue, the east boundary of Cylburn. The route's course to Downtown Baltimore includes a stop at the Mondawmin Metro/subway station.

MTA LocalLink 80, travels along Cylburn Avenue as it loops around Sinai Hospital at the northern edge of Cylburn on its way south toward City Hall in Downtown Baltimore. It stops at the Rogers Avenue Metro/subway station along the way to City Hall.

== Demographics ==
The neighborhood's population, estimated at 2,639 in 2009, was almost exclusively black. Cylburn's residents fared somewhat better economically than the rest of the City in 2009, with a median household income of $40,668 compared with the citywide median of $38,772. Residents living below the poverty level were 18.8 percent of Cylburn's population, compared with the city ratio of 22.9 percent.

== See also ==
List of Baltimore neighborhoods
