= List of streets in Baltimore =

This is a list of notable streets in the city of Baltimore, Maryland, United States.

== A ==
Street	Route	Communities	Landmarks	Notes
Abell Avenue	East 30th is the southern terminus and East University Parkway is the northern end.	Abell, Oakenshawe		Abell Avenue, much like the neighborhood is named after Arunah Shepherson Abell, the owner and founding publisher of The Baltimore Sun. It was named in 1902.
The Alameda	Harford Road north to Limit Avenue at city line (continues south as St. Lo Drive; continues north as Sherwood Road)	Ramblewood; Wilson Park; Pen Lucy	Baltimore City College	Planned as a road through a park when constructed. Carries MD 542 from south end to Loch Raven Boulevard. Served by bus routes 3 and 36.
Aliceanna Street	Boston Street west to dead end at Inner Harbor	Inner Harbor East, Fells Point, Canton	National Katyn Massacre Memorial	Site of house where Frederick Douglass once lived as slave (not known by that name then). Furniture store that was seed to Hecht's department store first opened on this street in the 1850s. Has a traffic circle with President Street.
Aisquith Street	East Baltimore Street is the southern most point, and Montpelier Street is the northern.	C-H-M, East Baltimore Midway, Oliver, Johnston Square, Oldtown, Pleasant View Gardens, Jonestown		The street was most likely named after William Aisquith father of Edward Aisquith, hero of the Battle of North Point.
Auchentoroly Terrace	Runs southwest from Reisterstown Rd to N Fulton Ave	Auchentoroly		George Buchanan, a Scottish physician who moved to Baltimore named the area Auchentorolie, after his family's land in Scotland.

== B ==
Street	Route	Communities	Landmarks	Notes
Barney Street	Webster Street in the east and Clarkson Street in the East	South Baltimore, Riverside	Riverside Park	Named after Commodore Joshua Barney, a naval officer who served in the Revolutionary War and the War of 1812.
Barre Street	South Paca in the South to McHenry Street in the north	Barre Circle		Named after Colonel Isaac Barré.
Bayard Street	Travels east west from Warner Street to Herkimer Street	Stadium Area, Carroll-Camden Industrial Area, Pigtown	Horseshoe Casino, Carroll Park	Named after James Asheton Bayard, Senator and American negotiator at the Treaty of Ghent which ended the War of 1812.
Bellona Avenue	Travels north south, from the City/County line (where it continues as Bellona Ave.) to York Road			Named after Bellona, the Roman goddess of war.
Benson Avenue	Travels northeast, from the City/County line (where it continues as Benson Ave.) to South Caton Avenue	Violetville	Saint Agnes Hospital, Seton Keogh High School	Named after Carville Dickenson Benson, Speaker of the House of Delegates, State Senator, and State insurance commissioner.
Bentalou Street	Travels northwest from West Baltimore St., to Windsor Avenue.			Named after Paul Bentalou calvery officer who served under Marquis de Lafayette in the American Revolutionary War.
Bessemer Avenue	Travels east west from Broening Highway to Carlotte Ave.	Broening Manor		Named for Sir Henry Bessemer.
Biddle Street	Park Biddle Avenue to East Chase Street	Berea		One-way pair (eastbound) with Preston Street. Named after Elizabeth Gordon Biddle. Once viewed as home of gentlemen, but now considered to be a run-down area. Former home of a railway station known as Biddle Street Station. Part of route of Bus Route 5.
Bonaparte Avenue	Loch Raven Boulevard to Harford Road			Named for the Baltimore Boneparts that began with Jerome.
Bond Street	North south from Thames Street to East North Avenue			Named for John Bond, one of the first residents of Fells Point.
Bouldin Street	Runs north south from Toone Street to Leverton Ave.			Named for Jehu Bouldin, Baltimore City's surveyor, who assisted Thomas H. Poppleton in drafting the first map of the city.
Brehm's Lane	Erdman Avenue to Parkside Drive	Belair-Edison		Named for George Brehm, founder and owner of Brehm's Brewery.
Broadway				
Broening Highway	O'Donnell Street to Baltimore Beltway	O'Donnell Heights	Riverside Generating Station	Former location of General Motors plant that closed in 2005 and the old Western Electric "Point Breeze" plant. In the county, it is maintained by the state as MD 695A.

== C ==
Street	Route	Communities	Landmarks	Notes
Carver Road	Runs southeast between Cherry Hill Rd and Bridgeview Rd	Cherry Hill		Named for George Washington Carver.
Caton Avenue	Runs northwest from S Hilton St to Edgewood St			Named for Richard Caton.
Chase Street	Runs east to west with interruptions from Iris Ave to N Martin Luther King Jr. Blvd.	Mount Vernon		Most likely named for Samuel Chase.
Chatham Street				Named for William Pitt, Earl of Chatham.
Chatham Road	Runs northwest from Calaway Ave and deadends after Eldorado Ave	Ashburton, Forest Park		Possibly William Pitt, ultimately unknown.
Colgate Avenue	Begins on N Dundalk Ave in the county and runs west to Chesapeake Ave.	Saint Helena		Richard Colegate, wealthy 17th and 18th century Maryland landowner.
Conway Street	Runs east to west from Light Street to Martin Luther King Jr. Boulevard	Inner Harbor, Otterbein, Ridgely's Delight	Camden Yards	Named after Henry Seymour Conway, leader of the House of Commons in the 1760's.
Crittenton Place	Runs north to south between W 32nd St to Mill Road	Hampden		Named for Charles Nelson Crittenton.
Culver Street	Runs southwest from N Hilton St to Old Frederick Rd.	Allendale	New Cathedral Cemetery	Named for businesswoman Helen Culver.
Cylburn Avenue	Runs southwest from W Northern Pwky to Pimlico Rd	Cylburn, Levindale	Cylburn Arboretum, Sinai Hospital	Named for the Cylburn Estate (now the Clyburn Arboretum).

== D ==
Street	Route	Communities	Landmarks	Notes
Decatur Street	Runs southwest from Beason St and dead ends past E Fort Ave.	Locust Point		Named for Stephen Decatur, an American naval officer, who fought in the War of 1812 and the Barbary Wars.
Dolfield Avenue	Runs between Garrison Ave and Hilton Rd	Forest Park, Ashburton		Named for prominent Baltimore banker, Alexander Y. Dolfield.
Druid Hill Avenue	Runs northwest from N Eutaw St to McCulloh St & Auchentoroly Terr	Druid Heights, Penn North, Upton		Named for Druid Hill Park which takes the name from the Baltimore merchant, Nicolas Rogers's mansion house.
Druid Park Lake Drive	Druid Hill Avenue to I-83 (continues as 28th/29th Streets)	Reservoir Hill	Druid Hill Park (southern border)	I-83 exit 7. Built in the 1940s as a barrier between Druid Hill Park and the neighborhoods to the south. Part of what was once planned as an interstate.

== E ==
Street	Route	Communities	Landmarks	Notes
Eager Street	Three discontinuous streets: Park Avenue to Guilford Avenue	Fallsway to dead end east of Collington Avenue; Madeira Street to alley between Linwood Avenue and Curley Street	Collington Square	One of three streets in Baltimore named after John Eager Howard. Had the only bridge not destroyed in the flood of 1854. Part of route of Bus Route 15.
Eden Street	Runs north from the harbor to Lanvale St			Named for the last royal governor of Maryland, Robert Eden.
Edmonson Avenue	Runs west from N Freemont Ave into the County			Named after Thomas Edmonson, a wealthy patron of the arts.
Erdman Avenue	Runs southeast from Harford Rd to N Point Blvd.	Belair-Edison, Organgeville, Armistead Gardens, Mayfield		Named for either a member of, or several members of, the Erdman family, who owned significant amounts of land to the south of the road.

== F ==
Street	Route	Communities	Landmarks	Notes
Fallsway	I-83 north to Guilford Avenue	Jonestown		Carries northbound traffic for part of Guilford Avenue that is one way. Built originally to accommodate railroad and subway lines. Construction later seen as a "mistake" by urban planners.
Federal Street	Aisquith Street to Orville Avenue (shortly past Erdman Avenue)	Collington Square		Bus routes 5 and 6 operate on part of Federal Street; Another small section of Federal Street exists west of Green Mount Cemetery
Fleet Street	President Street to Haven Street; Lehigh Street to Umbra Street	Inner Harbor East; Fells Point; Highlandtown; Brewer's Hill; Greektown		Formerly known as Canton Avenue. Part of route of Bus Route 31; Split by railroad and factory between Haven and Lehigh Sts.
Fremont Avenue	Pennsylvania Avenue to Booth Street	Upton; Sandtown-Winchester		Interrupted by US 40, where there is no crossing over the former I-170 freeway. Former route of the Fremont Avenue Streetcar Line and Bus Route 102 (both now defunct).

== G ==
Street	Route	Communities	Landmarks	Notes
Garrison Boulevard	Greenspring Avenue to Clifton Avenue	Pimlico; Forest Park	Garrison Middle School; Langston Hughes Elementary School	Part of route of Bus Route 91, formerly Garrison Boulevard Streetcar. Was original location of Beth Tfiloh Congregation.
Guilford Avenue	University Parkway to Baltimore Street (continues as South Street)	Charles Village	Copycat Building	Exit 3 off southbound Jones Falls Expressway. Served by bus route 36. Major rail center from the 1850s to 1950s. Former location of the Guilford Avenue Elevated Streetcar Trestle Line.

== K ==
Street	Route	Communities	Landmarks	Notes
Keith Avenue	Haven Street to Broening Highway			I-95 exit 56
Kelly Avenue	Cross Country Boulevard to Falls Road	Mt. Washington	Mount Washington Arboretum	Part of route of Bus Route 27. Prior to 1950, was not a road, but a streetcar track path. Was modified then in order to accommodate a change from streetcars to buses.

== M ==
Street	Route	Communities	Landmarks	Notes
Martin Luther King Jr. Boulevard	Howard Street south to I-395	Bolton Hill		Once part of a planned interstate. Originally called "Harbor City Boulevard." Is the route of the annual Martin Luther King's Day Parade in Baltimore.

== P ==
Street	Route	Communities	Landmarks	Notes
Patterson Park Avenue	Sinclair Lane to Essex Street	Collington Square; Butcher's Hill; Canton; McElderry Park	Patterson Park	Western boundary of Patterson Park. Part of route of bus routes 5, 7, and 13

== R ==
Street	Route	Communities	Landmarks	Notes
Redwood Street	various discontinuous sections between Martin Luther King Jr. Boulevard and South Street	Downtown Baltimore	Old Saint Paul's Cemetery; University of Maryland at Baltimore; University of Maryland Medical Center	There are three discontinuous sections of Redwood Street: one from Martin Luther King Jr. Boulevard to a dead end just east of Penn Street, one from Greene Street to a dead end just east of Eutaw Street, and one from Charles Street to South Street. Formerly known as German Street, and before that Lovely Lane. Named after George Redwood, the first officer killed in France in World War I.

== Numbered streets ==
Street	Route	Communities	Landmarks	Notes
25th Street	Howard Street to Wolfe Street	Remington		This street serves as a two way east–west large thoroughfare into lower/southern Charles Village. Formerly known as Huntingdon Avenue (for the old village named along the Greenmount Avenue/Old York Road in the now Waverly residential neighborhood and commercial strip. A part of Huntingdon Avenue between 25th and 31st Streets in Remington still exists under that name.

== See also ==
- List of roads in Baltimore County, Maryland
