= Johnston Square, Baltimore =

Neighborhood in Baltimore, Maryland, US

Coordinates: 39°18′11″N 76°36′20.5″W

Johnston Square
- Neighborhood of Baltimore
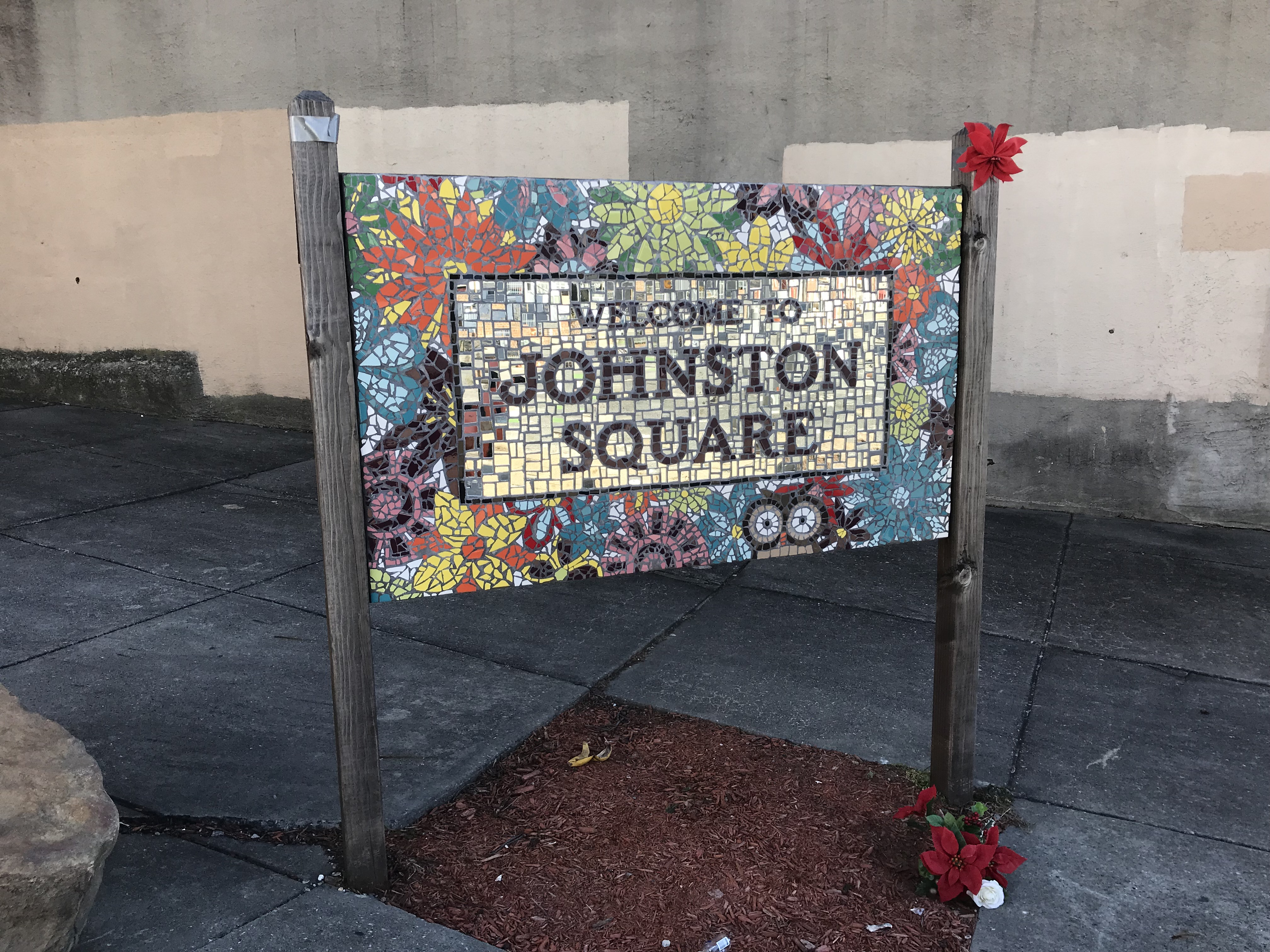
- Johnston Square gateway sign at the corner of Greenmount Avenue and E. Biddle Street in Baltimore

- Location within Baltimore Location within Maryland Location within the United States
- Country: United States
- State: Maryland
- City: Baltimore
- Time zone: UTC−5 (Eastern)
  - Summer (DST): UTC−4 (EDT)
- Area Codes: 410, 443, 667

Johnston Square is a neighborhood in central Baltimore, Maryland located east of the Fallsway and west of the Oliver neighborhood, bordered by Greenmount Cemetery at the north and Eager Street at the south.

The neighborhood contains Johnston Square Elementary School, and two parks: Johnston Square Park and Ambrose Kennedy Park. It is one of five neighborhoods whose Urban Renewal Plans are included in the East Baltimore Revitalization Plan. The neighborhood contains portions of the Baltimore City Correctional Facilities and its residents are mostly low income African-American families. It has been used as a filming location on the HBO drama The Wire.
