= Lois Feinblatt =

American nurse and educator

- Born: Lois Hoffberger; 1921; Baltimore, Maryland, U.S.
- Died: April 15, 2022 (aged 100); Guilford, Baltimore
- Education: Forest Park High School; Goucher College; Johns Hopkins School of Medicine (MA)
- Occupation: Sex therapist
- Years active: 1957–2022
- Spouses: Irving Blum (m. 1941; died 1973); Eugene M. Feinblatt (m. 1983; died 1998)
- Children: 3

Lois Blum Feinblatt (1921 – April 15, 2022) was an American nurse and professor of psychiatry who made contributions to sexual therapy and mental health.

== Early life and education ==
Born in 1921 in Baltimore, Lois Feinblatt was a member of the Hoffberger family. She graduated from Forest Park High School in 1938 and received her bachelor's degree from Goucher College in 1942 after transferring from Hood College. She further advanced her education at the Johns Hopkins University School of Medicine, where she earned a master's degree in mental health, and received training as a mental health counselor at the Henry Phipps Psychiatric Clinic.

== Career ==
Feinblatt worked for the Baltimore City Department of Welfare for nine years beginning in 1957, evaluating adoptive parents. In 1970, she joined a new initiative at Johns Hopkins, the Sexual Behaviors Consultation Unit, which was influenced by the work of sex researchers William Masters and Virginia E. Johnson.

In the 1960s, Feinblatt was selected for a Johns Hopkins University program that trained women to become professional mental health counselors. Feinblatt later specialized in human sexuality and was part of the team that established the Johns Hopkins Sexual Behaviors Consultation Unit.

Feinblatt was actively involved in civil rights, participating in the 1963 desegregation march for Gwynn Oak Park and becoming the first woman appointed to the board of Sheppard Pratt Hospital in 1977. Her philanthropic efforts included founding scholarships at the Maryland Institute College of Art and establishing CASA of Baltimore, which assists child victims of abuse and neglect. She also founded the Blum Mentoring Project for Baltimore City Public Schools following her second husband's death and served on the board of the Baltimore Museum of Art.

== Personal life and death ==
Lois Hoffberger married Irving Blum in 1941 and they had three children. He died in 1973. In 1983, Lois married Eugene M. Feinblatt, who died in 1998. She was Jewish. Feinblatt died on April 15, 2022, in Guilford, Baltimore, at the age of 100.
