= L. Frank & Son Building =

Historic building in Maryland, USA

- U.S. National Register of Historic Places
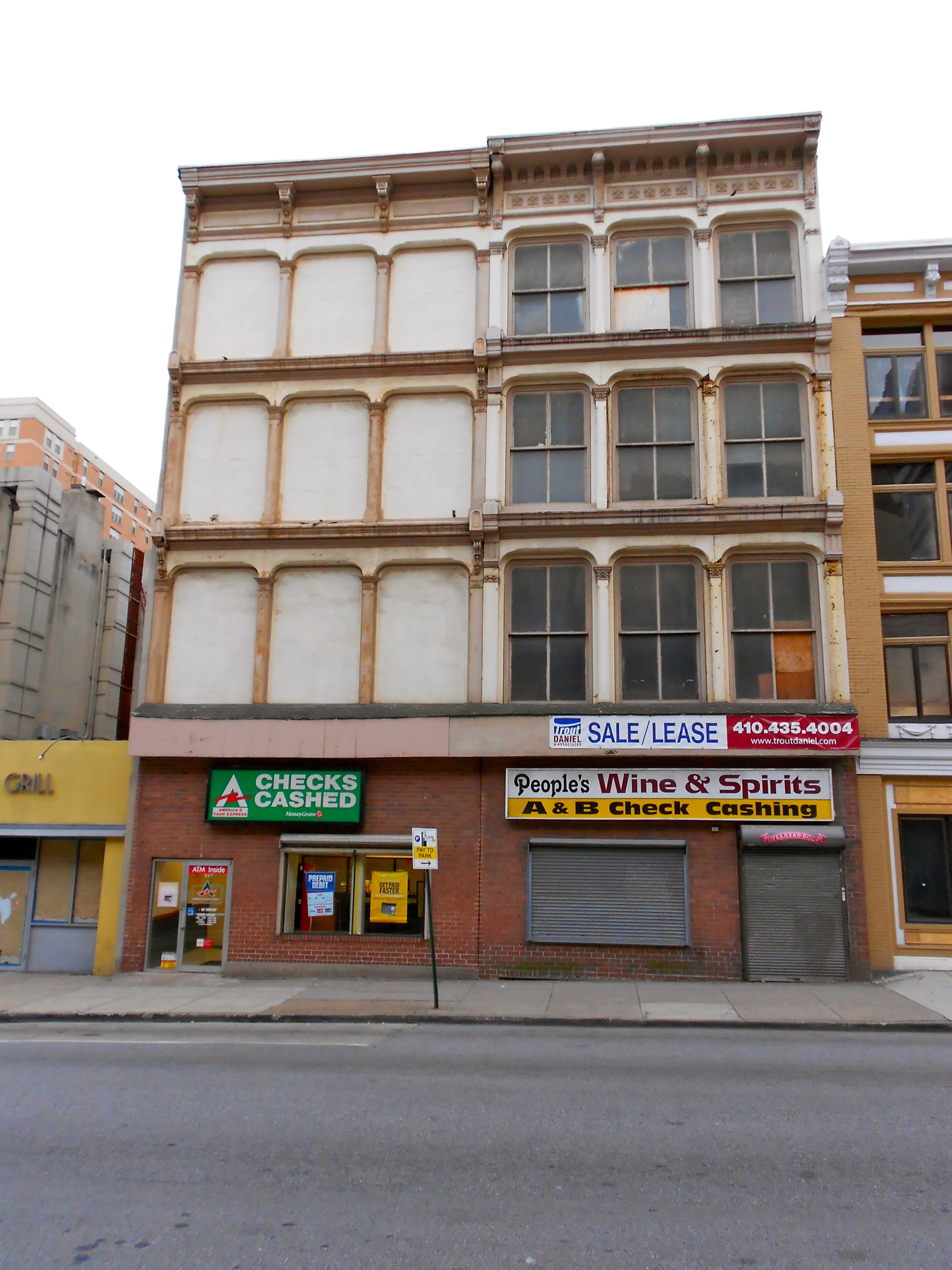
- Frank & Son building on the left

- Location within Baltimore Location within Maryland Location within the United States
- Location: 407 W. Baltimore St., Baltimore, Maryland
- Coordinates: 39°17′21.1″N 76°37′16.9″W
- Area: less than one acre
- Built: 1875
- Architectural style: Italianate
- MPS: Cast Iron Architecture of Baltimore MPS
- NRHP reference No.: 94001642
- Added to NRHP: January 19, 1995

L. Frank & Son Building is a historic retail building located at Baltimore, Maryland, United States. It is a four-story brick commercial building with a cast-iron façade, built about 1875. It was constructed for Samuel Stein & Bros., and occupied by a dealer in iron ranges and furnaces, and later a series of shoe and clothing manufacturers.

L. Frank & Son Building was listed on the National Register of Historic Places in 1994. The building at 409 West Baltimore Street, next door, was listed at the same time.
