= Cecil Apartments =

- U.S. National Register of Historic Places
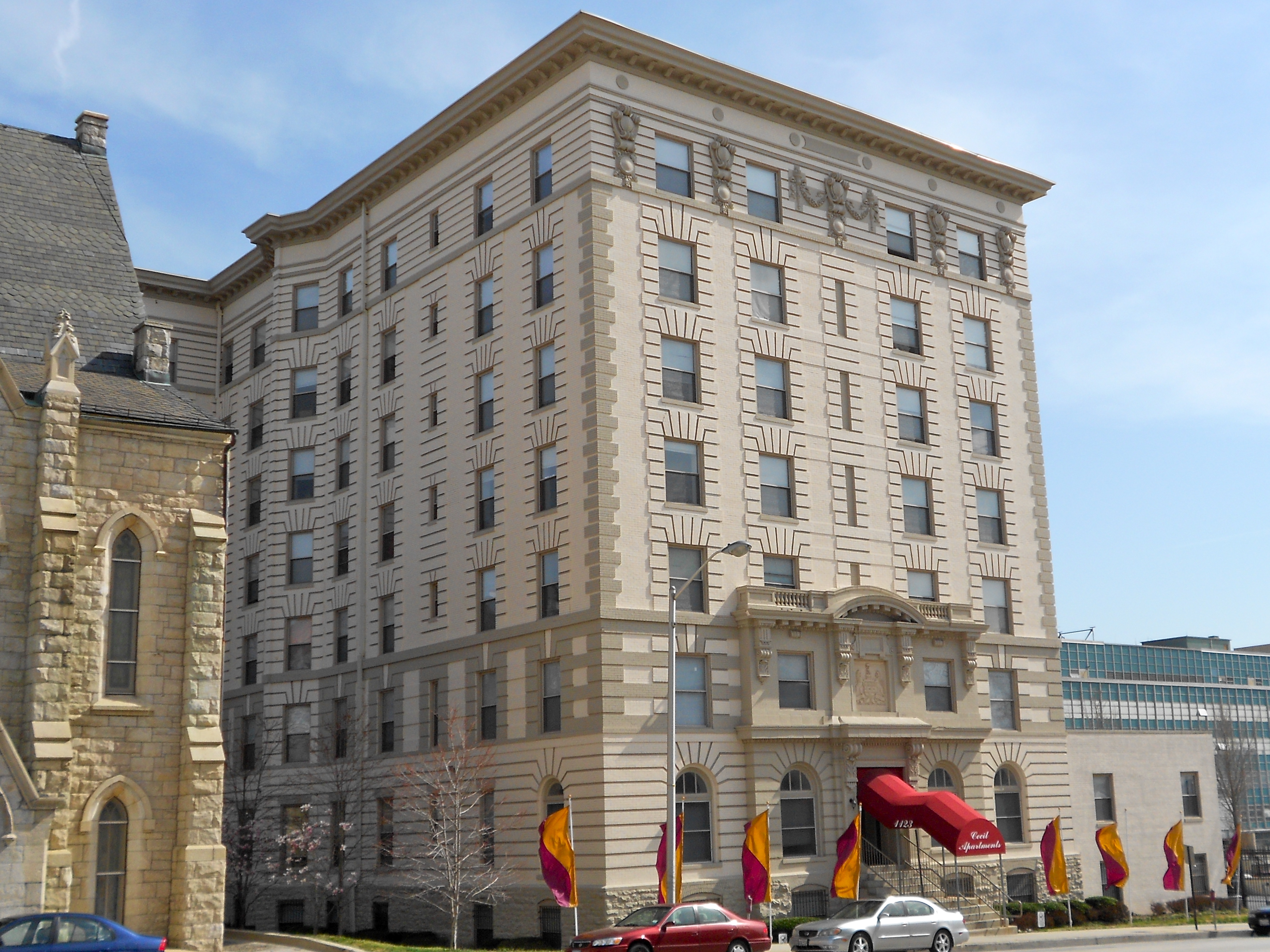
- Cecil Apartments, March 2012

- Location within Baltimore Location within Maryland Location within the United States
- Location: 1123 N. Eutlaw St., Baltimore, Maryland
- Coordinates: 39°18′11″N 76°37′29″W
- Area: 0.5 acres (0.20 ha)
- Built: 1902
- Architectural style: Beaux Arts
- NRHP reference No.: 00000743
- Added to NRHP: June 30, 2000

Cecil Apartments is a historic apartment building in Baltimore, Maryland, United States. It is a seven-story building constructed of multiple shades of light-colored brick, accented with limestone and cast terra cotta ornament in the Beaux-Arts style. The structure takes the form of a "T". Constructed in 1902, it was one of the first important apartment buildings in Baltimore, built at the edge of the city's most elite downtown neighborhood, Bolton Hill. It was designed by Baltimore architect Edward Hughes Glidden, and it marked the evolution of elite living that had come to characterize the Bolton Hill neighborhood. Despite the apartments' location often being referred to as Bolton Hill, it is actually within the boundaries of the adjacent Madison Park neighborhood.

Cecil Apartments was listed on the National Register of Historic Places in 2000.
