= Stadium Area, Baltimore =

Neighborhood in Baltimore

Stadium Area
- Neighborhood of Baltimore
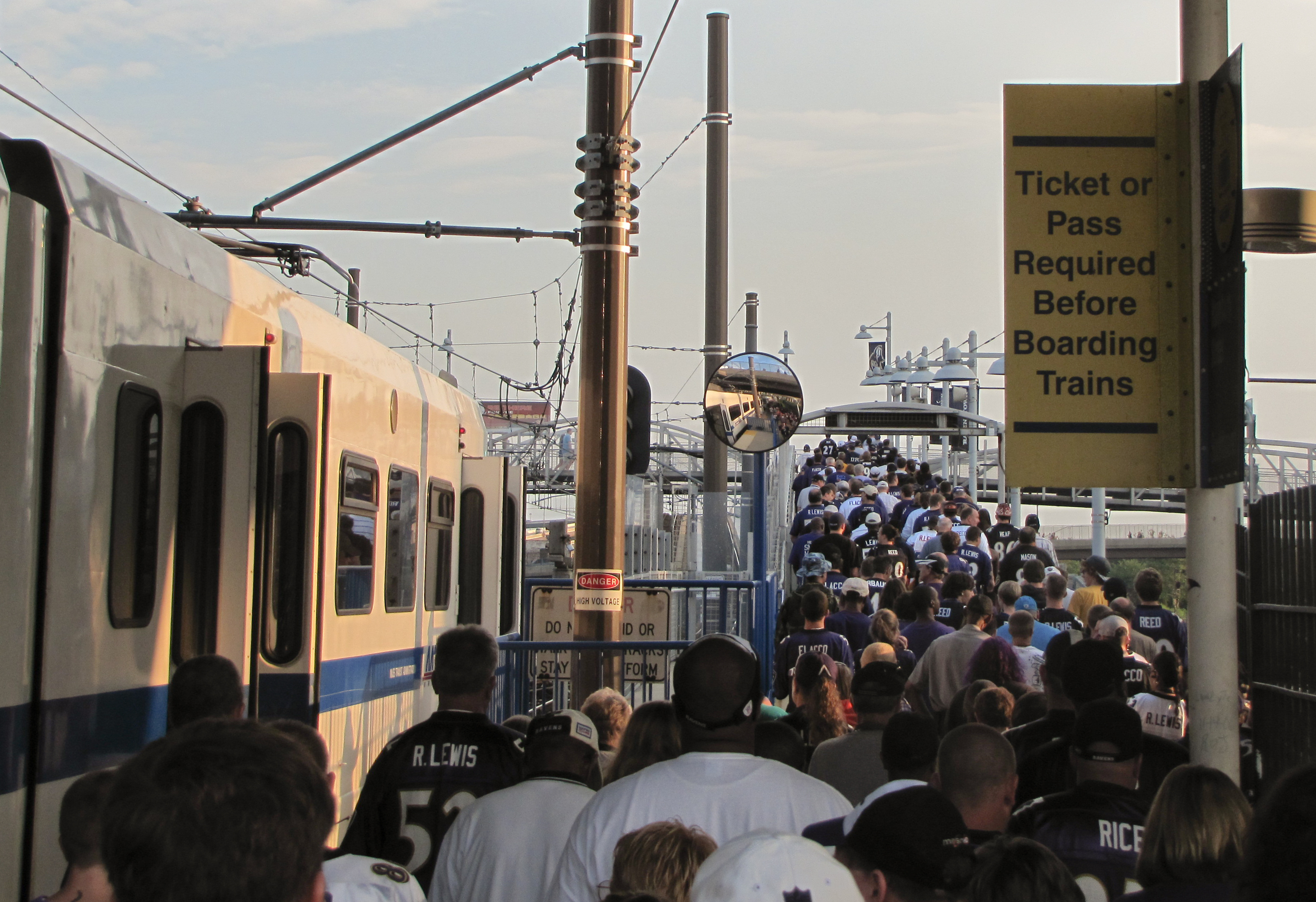
- Crowd Baltimore Ravens fans at Stadium/Federal Hill station in Stadium Area, Baltimore

- Location within Baltimore Location within Maryland Location within the United States
- Coordinates: 39.281°N 76.623°W
- Country: United States
- State: Maryland
- City: Baltimore
- Time zone: UTC−5 (Eastern)
  - Summer (DST): UTC−4 (EDT)
- Area Codes: 410, 443, 667

Stadium Area is a neighborhood in south Baltimore, Maryland. The area is largely consistent of adjacent sports stadiums, M&T Bank Stadium and Oriole Park at Camden Yards, and the surrounding infrastructure supporting them.

== Geography ==
The Stadium area is bounded by Russell Street to the west, Washington Boulevard and West Camden Street to the north, South Howard Street and Cal Ripken Way to the east, and West Ostend Street and Stockholm Street to the south. Adjacent neighborhoods include Washington Village/Pigtown (west), Ridgely's Delight (northwest), Downtown West (north), Otterbein (northeast), Sharp-Leadenhall (east), Spring Garden Industrial Area (southeast), and Carroll-Camden Industrial Area (south/southwest).

== History ==
The Maryland General Assembly established the Maryland Stadium Authority on July 1, 1986, to select and develop stadium sites in the Baltimore metropolitan area. On July 1, 1987, the law which established the Stadium Authority was amended to enable the construction of new facilities in the Camden Yards area of Baltimore City, and to designate the Authority as an independent unit in the executive branch of the state government. Oriole Park at Camden Yards opened on April 6, 1992, and NFL Stadium at Camden Yards (now M&T Bank Stadium) opened on August 6, 1998.

The Stadium Authority negotiates leasing agreements with the Baltimore Orioles and the Baltimore Ravens sports teams for their continued use of the area as their home playing fields. The Authority has also been tasked with facilitating the use of the city's stadiums outside of sporting events; for example, they helped coordinate a blood drive and a mass vaccination center at M&T Bank Stadium in 2021 as part of the response to the COVID-19 pandemic. The Maryland Stadium Authority is also responsible for the Pimlico Race Course in northwest Baltimore, and as of 2021 is currently coordinating its planned redevelopment.

== Transportation ==
The Stadium Area is served by two stations on the Baltimore Light Rail, Camden station and Stadium/Federal Hill station (formerly known as Hamburg Street station).
