= Callaway-Garrison, Baltimore =

Callaway-Garrison
- neighborhood statistical area
- Location within Baltimore
- Coordinates: 39°19′57″N 76°40′46″W
- Country: United States
- State: Maryland
- City: Baltimore

Area
  - Total: 0.238 sq mi (0.62 km^{2})
  - Land: 0.238 sq mi (0.62 km^{2})

Population (2009)
  - Total: 1,926
  - Density: 8,090/sq mi (3,120/km^{2})
- Time zone: UTC-5 (Eastern)
  - Summer (DST): UTC-4 (EDT)
- ZIP code: 21215
- Area code: 410, 443, and 667

Callaway-Garrison is a neighborhood in the Northwest district of Baltimore, located between the neighborhoods of Dorchester (west) and Ashburton (east). Its boundaries are marked by West Cold Spring Lane (north), Liberty Heights Avenue (south), Callaway Avenue (east) and Garrison Boulevard (west).

== Demographics ==
The neighborhood's population, estimated at 1,926 in 2009, is predominantly black. With 22.7 percent of its families estimated to be living below the poverty level, Callaway-Garrison residents suffered economic hardship comparable with the rest of the city, which had an estimate of 22.9 percent of its families below the poverty line in 2009. Median household income, at $29,099 during 2009, was significantly less than the city median of $38,772. Single family housing prices, at an average of $195,966, were also significantly less than city-wide average $272,562 for single-family houses.

== Public Transportation ==
LocalLink 82 (BaltimoreLink), the Mondawmin Metro Shuttle Bug, runs along Callaway Avenue at the neighborhood's eastern boundary, providing local bus service to Coppin State University, Mondawmin Mall, Baltimore City Community College and the Mondawmin Metro subway station.

LocalLink 80 (BaltimoreLink) provides local bus service along Garrison Boulevard, the neighborhood's western boundary, as it travels between Sinai Hospital (north) and Downtown Baltimore (south).

== See also ==
List of Baltimore neighborhoods
