= Upton, Baltimore =

Upton
- Neighborhood of Baltimore
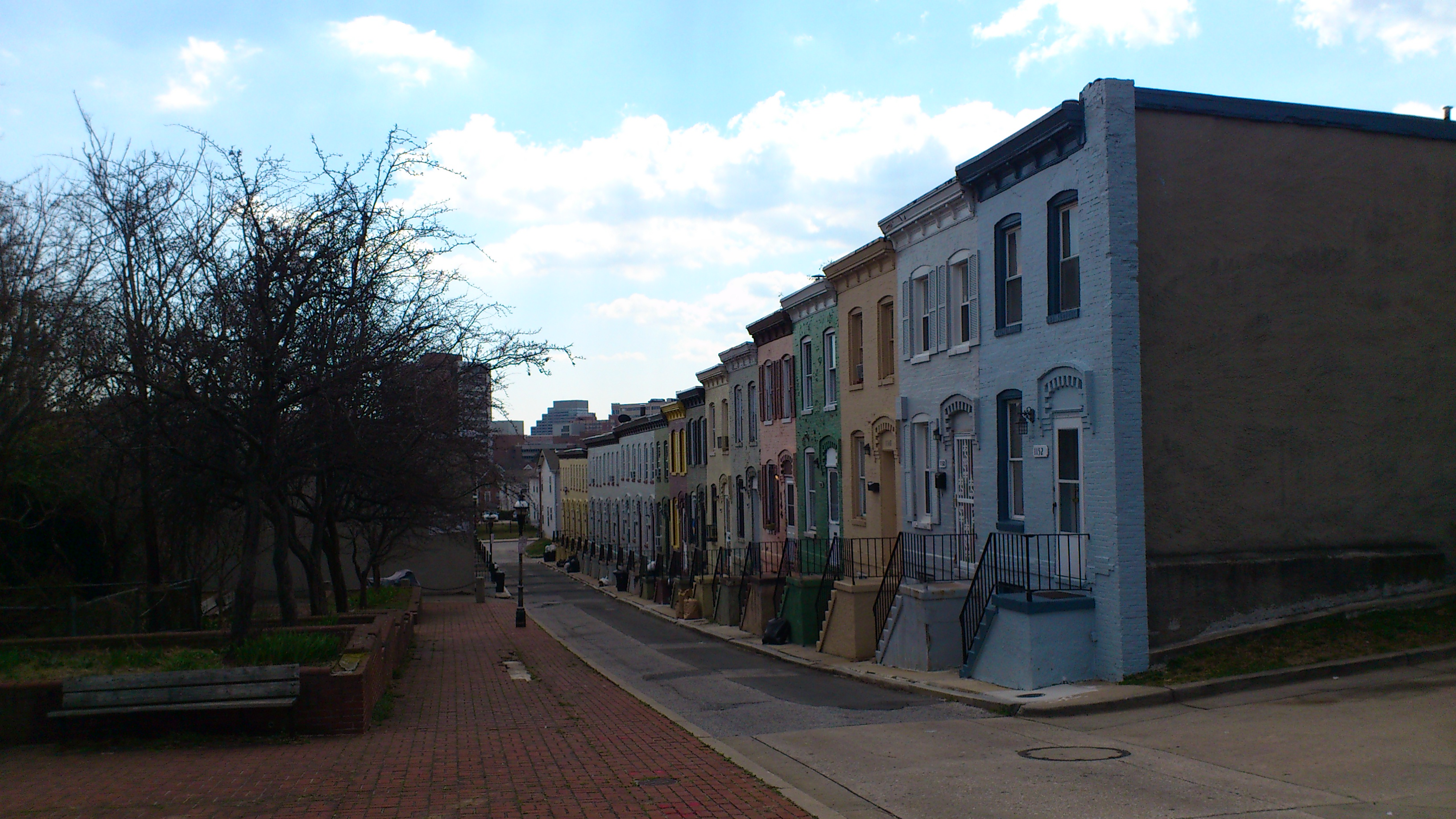
- Alley rowhouses in Southeast Upton
- Nickname: "Baltimore's Harlem"
- Location within Baltimore
- Coordinates: 39°18′7″N 76°37′58″W
- Country: United States
- State: Maryland
- City: Baltimore
- Time zone: UTC-5 (Eastern)
  - Summer (DST): EDT
- ZIP code: 21217
- Area code: 410, 443, and 667

Upton is a neighborhood in Baltimore, Maryland, United States. The neighborhood is in the western section of the city, roughly between Fremont Avenue and McCulloh Street, extending from Dolphin Street to Bloom Street. Its principal thoroughfare is Pennsylvania Avenue.

Located within the Old West Baltimore Historic District, Upton has historically been one of the economic, political and cultural centers of the city's black community. In the early 21st century, it is the focus of the city's urban revitalization programs.

== History ==
At the turn of the 20th century, Upton was one of the most affluent African American neighborhoods in the United States. The Pennsylvania Avenue commuter rail station on the Baltimore and Potomac Rail Road was built in 1884. By the 1920s, Upton was home to most educated African-American property owners in Baltimore. To its south and west were the poor and working class African-American neighborhoods of "The Bottom," and to its east were German-American and Jewish-American neighborhoods.

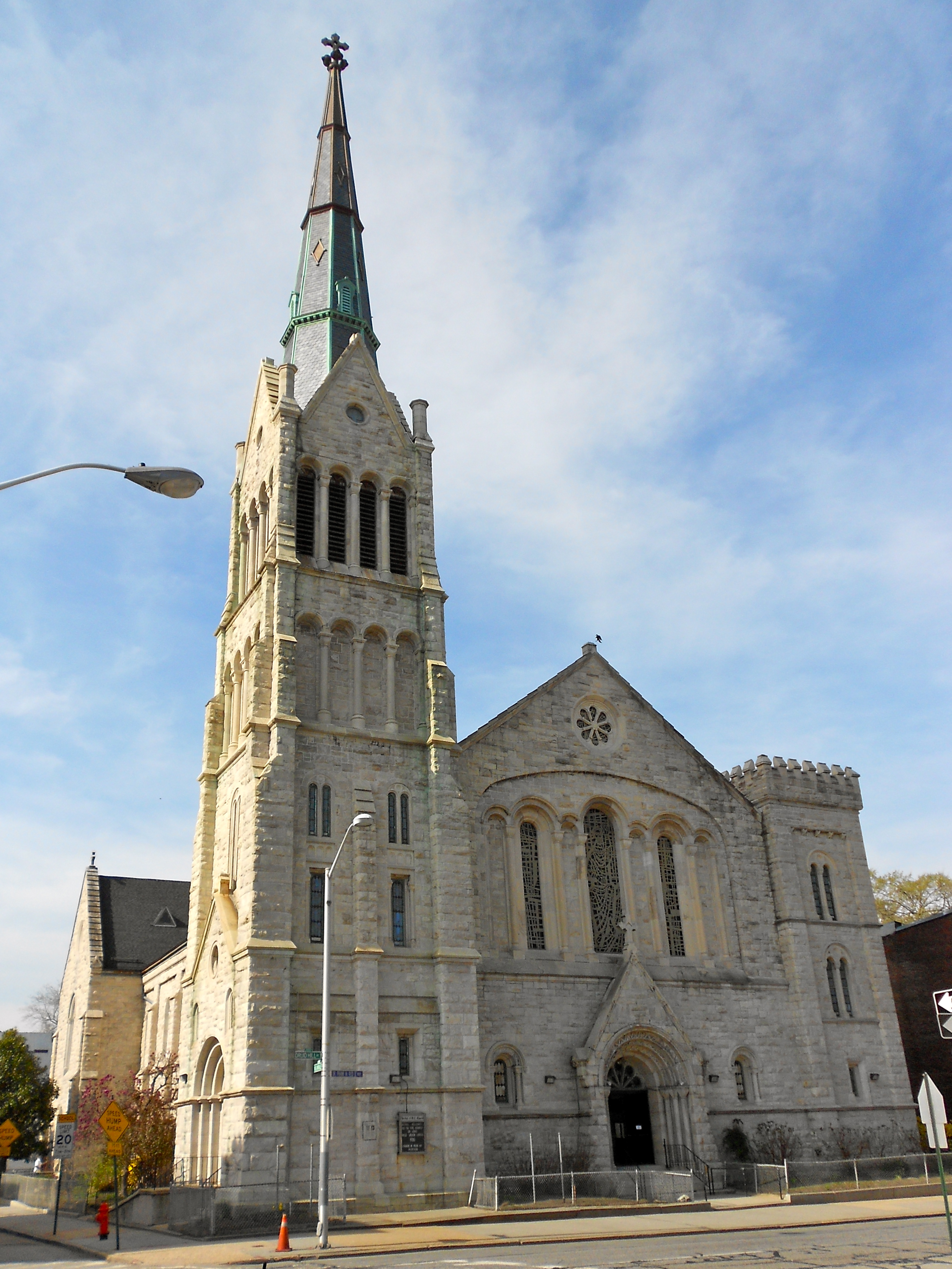
Bethel AME Church, 1300 Druid Hill Avenue

Pennsylvania Avenue was the premiere shopping strip for black Baltimoreans, inspiring comparisons to Lenox Avenue in Harlem. It was home to professionals such as doctors and lawyers, retailers who served a middle class and upscale clientele, jazz clubs, dance halls, theaters, and other public and private institutions for the black community. Cab Calloway grew up in Upton, and Eubie Blake performed his debut in a club on Pennsylvania Avenue. The Royal Theater, at Pennsylvania and Lafayette, became a mainstay on the Chitlin Circuit.

Upton was a base for much of the local and national civil rights movement. Booker T Washington, W. E. B. Du Bois, and Marcus Garvey all visited local churches. Supreme Court Justice Thurgood Marshall was born and raised in the neighborhood at 1632 Division Street. The Baltimore chapter of the NAACP was based in Upton when it was developed.

In the mid-20th century, Upton's population swelled due to the popularity of the neighborhood and the pressures of state racial segregation that kept African Americans confined to certain areas in the city. Single family homes were subdivided into small apartments, and Pennsylvania Avenue's sidewalks were crowded on Saturday nights. Loud music and heavy drinking became popular vices of the newer Upton residents. Upper-income black families began abandoning the area for neighborhoods away from the center of the city, as part of the suburbanization under way in many cities.

In the 1960s and '70s, controversial urban renewal projects destroyed much of Upton's historic architecture, especially in the southwestern portion of the neighborhood. The city constructed public housing projects known as the Murphy Homes to accommodate more people but did not replace all the units that were lost. In addition, once the historic buildings were razed, it was difficult to secure developers to build new construction. The Royal Theater was demolished in 1971.

A statue of Billie Holiday, a native of Baltimore, and a frequent performer at the Royal Theatre, is located at 1400 Pennsylvania Avenue. It was unveiled in 1985.

== Marble Hill ==
The eastern section of the neighborhood, relatively untouched by urban renewal, was declared a national historic district in 1985. This area is today known as Marble Hill. It contains many historic rowhouses of the Queen Anne and Italianate styles, featuring high ceilings, decorative ironwork, and white marble steps.

== Transportation ==
Upton is about a fifteen-minute walk from Downtown Baltimore. It is served by the Baltimore Metro Subway at the Upton/Avenue Market Metro Subway Station underneath the intersection of Pennsylvania and Laurens Street. The high frequency CityLink Lime bus runs along Pennsylvania Avenue, while the Pink route runs along Dolphin Street and Druid Hill Avenue, and Yellow along nearby Eutaw Place. The LocalLink 73 bus runs along Dolphin Street.

== Upton in the 21st century ==
Modern landmarks include The Avenue Market, Shake & Bake Family Fun Center, and Arabber Preservation Society. Founded in the early 2000s, the Upton Boxing Center has produced stars Gervonta "Tank" Davis and Mia "Killer-Bee" Ellis under the tutelage of trainer Calvin Ford, the inspiration for character Dennis "Cutty" Wise in the HBO drama The Wire.

=== Demographics ===
Data collected by the city and the Baltimore Neighborhood Indicators Alliance combines Upton and Druid Heights into a tabulation area. In 2022, the area's median home sale price was $172,500 and 51.4% of households had no available vehicles. The area was 88.8% Black/African-American, 6.1% White/Caucasian, 1.7% Two or More Races, .9% Asian, and .7% All Other Races. 39% of family households were below the poverty line.

=== Revitalization efforts ===
In recent years, the neighborhood has undergone initiatives aimed at reducing vacancy, poverty, and gun violence.

Beginning in 2019, developers rehabilitated dozens of rowhouses on Harlem and Edmondson Avenues as part of the Upton Gateway project. In 2024, the Baltimore Main Streets program opened an office at 1829 Pennsylvania Avenue. That September, a development team headed by Alvin Hathaway Sr., pastor at the nearby Union Baptist Church, completed renovation of the P.S. 103 building into the Thurgood Marshall Amenity Center at 1315 Division Street. In October 2024, Black Women Build, a non-profit founded by Upton resident Shelley Halstead, was named one of nine recipients of funding from JPMorgan Chase to combat housing vacancy in Baltimore.

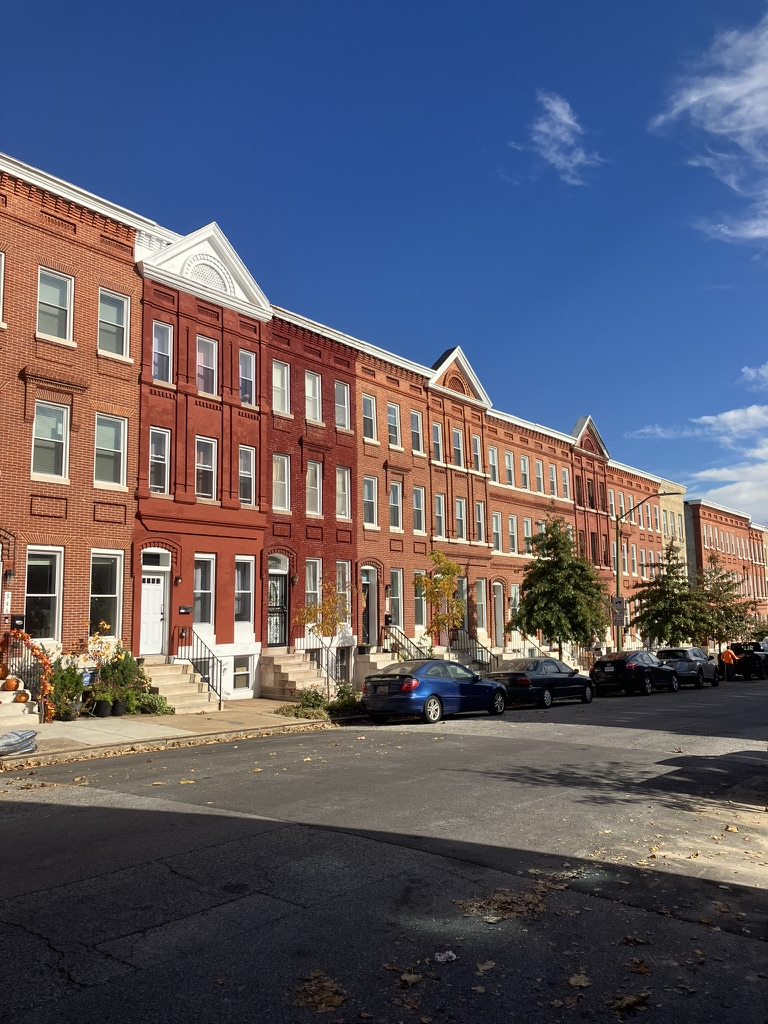
Houses along Harlem Avenue rehabilitated as part of the Upton Gateway program.

== See also ==
- List of Baltimore neighborhoods
