= Druid Heights, Baltimore =

Neighborhood in Baltimore

Druid Heights
- Neighborhood of Baltimore
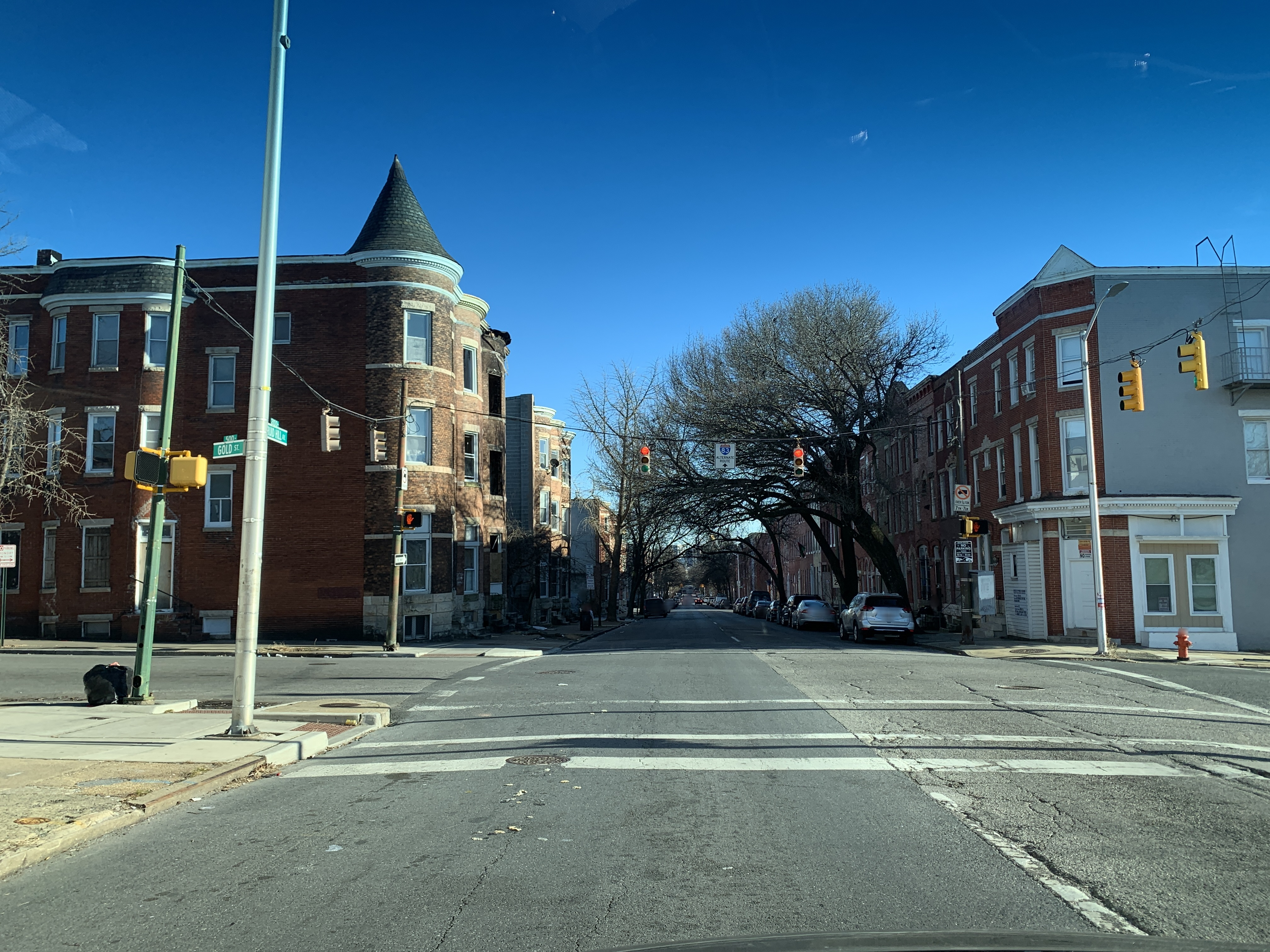
- View south from Druid Hill Avenue at intersection with Gold Street in Druid Heights, Baltimore

- Location within Baltimore Location within Maryland Location within the United States
- Coordinates: 39°18′31″N 76°38′16″W
- Country: United States
- State: Maryland
- City: Baltimore
- City Council: District 11

Area
  - Total: 0.0905 sq mi (0.234 km^{2})

Population (2020)
  - Total: 1,267
  - Density: 14,000/sq mi (5,400/km^{2})
- Time zone: UTC−5 (Eastern)
  - Summer (DST): UTC−4 (EDT)
- ZIP Codes: 21217
- Area Codes: 410, 443, 667

Druid Heights is a neighborhood in west Baltimore.

== Geography ==
Druid Heights is bounded by North Avenue to the north, Madison Avenue and McCulloh Street to the east, Laurens Street and Bloom Street to the south, and Pennsylvania Avenue to the west. Adjacent neighborhoods are Penn-North (northwest), Reservoir Hill (northeast), Madison Park (east), Upton (south), and Sandtown-Winchester (west).
