= Medfield, Baltimore =

Coordinates: 39°20′23.5″N 76°38′38.6″W

Medfield
- Neighborhood of Baltimore
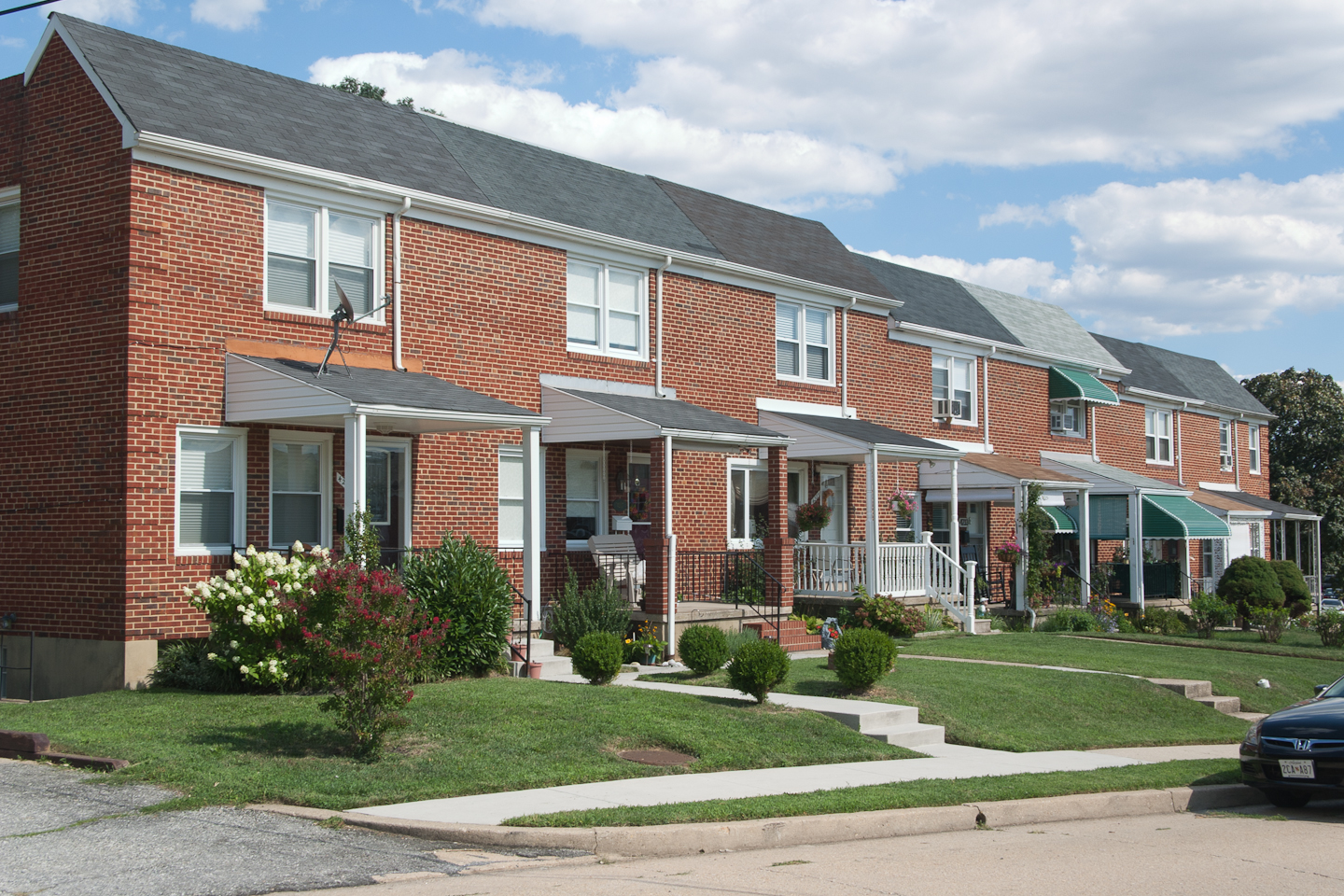
- Houses along Newport Avenue

- Location within Baltimore
- Country: United States
- State: Maryland
- City: Baltimore

Area
  - Total: .267 sq mi (0.69 km^{2})
  - Land: .267 sq mi (0.69 km^{2})

Population (2010)
  - Total: 2,348
- Time zone: UTC-5 (Eastern)
  - Summer (DST): EDT
- ZIP code: 21211
- Area code: 410, 443, and 667

Medfield is a neighborhood located in north Baltimore, Maryland, United States of America. It is located to the north of the trendy Hampden neighborhood and south of affluent Roland Park neighborhood. Its unofficial boundaries are Coldspring Lane to the north; Jones Falls Expressway (Interstate 83) to the west; Falls Road/Hickory Avenue to the east; and West 41st Street to the south.

== History ==
Part of Medfield was built on the grounds of the Medfield Academy, a 19th-century prep school believed to have stood near 42nd Street west of Falls Road. Baltimore annexed the southern half of Medfield in 1888 and the northern half in 1918.

Most of Medfield was developed from the 1920s through the 1960s. The southern section of the neighborhood (that adjacent to Hampden) and the northern section (off of Cold Spring Lane) were the first areas to be developed. The middle was developed from the 1940s - 1950s. Many of the first residents of Medfield were longtime residents of Hampden, who wished to move into newer houses, some of which had larger yards.

Medfield is currently divided among the 6th, 7th, and 14th districts of the Baltimore City Council. The Medfield Community Association is a volunteer organization that represents the neighborhood, whose mission is to empower the community to improve quality of life through communication, engagement, participation, and advocacy.

== Housing stock ==
Medfield contains a variety of types of houses, far more variety than most Baltimore neighborhoods. Most of the neighborhood consists of brick rowhouses, most of which include front porches. There are also many single-family detached houses throughout the neighborhood, as well as several apartment buildings.

== Schools ==
Medfield is home to Medfield Heights Elementary School (MHES) which boasts test scores above city/state averages. A $35 million rebuild of MHES was completed in 2020, which nearly tripled the size of the school. The neighborhood is also adjacent to the campuses of Baltimore Polytechnic Institute and Western High School, two well-regarded public magnet schools.

The community is also about 1 mile from Loyola University Maryland and about 2 miles from Johns Hopkins University Homewood Campus.

== Parks and Recreation ==
Medfield Heights Park is located directly behind Medfield Heights Elementary School, and is overseen by Baltimore City Public Schools. This park contains 2 baseball fields, basketball courts, and green space. Medfield is also near several parks in Hampden (Roosevelt Park on Falls Road and W. 36th Street; and Buena Vista Park on West 42nd Street at Buena Vista Avenue). It is also about 2 miles from Lake Roland Park in Baltimore County.

Adjacent to the Medfield Heights Park is the Medfield Heights Recreation Center, which is managed by the Baltimore City Department of Recreation and Parks. The facility received a complete renovation in 2009 and was equipped with an e-sports lab in 2024.

== Transportation ==
Medfield is easily accessible by many methods of transportation. The community is located directly off of Exit 9 of the Jones Falls Expressway (I-83), and is served by the Cold Spring Lane station of the Baltimore Light Rail, and MTA bus lines 21, 22, 28, and 94. Development

Several housing developments have been completed since 2017, including the 43-townhome Skyview development and the 130-townhome Residences at Roland Heights.

Additionally, a community group involving residents of the Medfield, Hampden, and Woodbery neighborhoods explored the construction of a dog park at Buena Vista Park but that project has not materialized.

Union Collective opened in 2018 at 1700 W 41st St. Located in a former Sears warehouse, the collective is made up of Union Craft Brewing and various other local vendors, some using the space as their main headquarters, others as a manufacturing location, and almost all as a storefront.
