= Forest Park High School (Maryland) =

Coordinates: 39.332°N 76.689°W

Location
- 3701 Eldorado Avenue; Baltimore, Maryland 21207; United States

Information
- School type: Public, Comprehensive
- Motto: Enter to learn, Go forth to serve
- Founded: 1924
- School district: Baltimore City Public Schools
- School number: 406
- Principal: Ninia Mouzone
- Grades: 9–12
- Enrollment: 597 (2019)
- Area: Urban
- Colors: Green and Gray
- Mascot: Foresters
- Website: BCPSS Site

Forest Park High School is a public secondary school in the Dorchester neighborhood of Baltimore, Maryland, United States. Forest Park was established in 1924 as the Forest Park Junior-Senior High School. In 1932, the Forest Park Junior High School was moved and renamed the Garrison Junior High School.

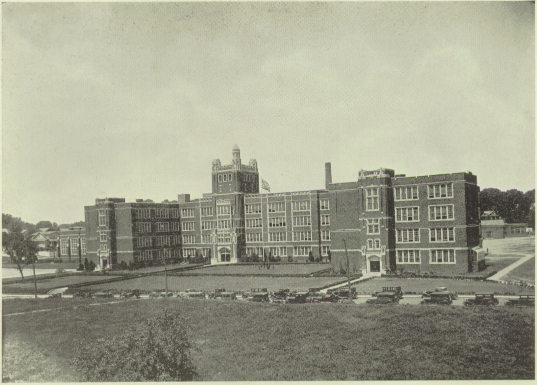
The original Forest Park High School building, 1930

The Old Senior High School remained at its 4300 Chatham Road location until 1981 when it was torn down and the new school was built and occupied at the current Eldorado location. The school later underwent renovations through the 21st Century Schools program, and it reopened in September 2018, after students temporarily were in the Northwestern High School building.

== Notable faculty ==
- Wendell E. Dunn, principal 1935–1961

== Notable alumni ==
- Spiro T. Agnew, 39th Vice President of the United States
- Thomas Beck, film actor
- H Steven Blum, retired United States Army Lieutenant General who served as Chief of the National Guard Bureau
- Andrew J. Boyle, U.S. Army lieutenant general
- William Ellinghaus, businessman
- Cass Elliot, singer, Mama Cass of The Mamas & the Papas
- Lois Feinblatt (1921–2022), sex therapist
- Herbert Alan Gerwig (1931–2011), professional wrestler also known as "Killer Karl Kox"
- Billy Griffin, lead singer of The Miracles, solo artist
- Margaret Hayes, film and television actress
- Barbara A. Hoffman, (D), Maryland State Senator, District 42, Baltimore (1983–2003)
- Earl Hofmann, Baltimore Realist artist, graduated 1946
- Barry Levinson, movie director
- Harvey Meyerhoff, businessman, fundraiser, and philanthropist
- Robert C. Murphy, chief judge, Maryland Court of Appeals
- Mark Rosenker, former chairman, National Transportation Safety Board (NTSB) and major general, USAF (ret)
- Alan Sagner, New Jersey Commissioner of Transportation
- Howard "Chip" Silverman, author and lacrosse coach
- Mary Tabor, author of literary fiction
- Celeste Ulrich (1924–2011), leading educator in physical education; graduated 1942
- Arnold M. Weiner, attorney
