= St. Helena, Baltimore =

Neighborhood of Baltimore, Maryland

Coordinates: 39°15′45″N 76°31′56″W

St. Helena is a neighborhood in the cities of Baltimore and Dundalk in the U.S. state of Maryland. The border between the cities, which is also the border between Baltimore County and Baltimore City, divides the neighborhood. The neighborhood was named by Colonel Arthur Bryan after the island of Saint Helena. It has a mix of rowhouses and detached homes. It is divided by railroad tracks from the Point Breeze Industrial Park.
