= Carroll-Camden Industrial Area, Baltimore =

Neighborhood in Baltimore

Carroll-Camden Industrial Area
- Neighborhood of Baltimore
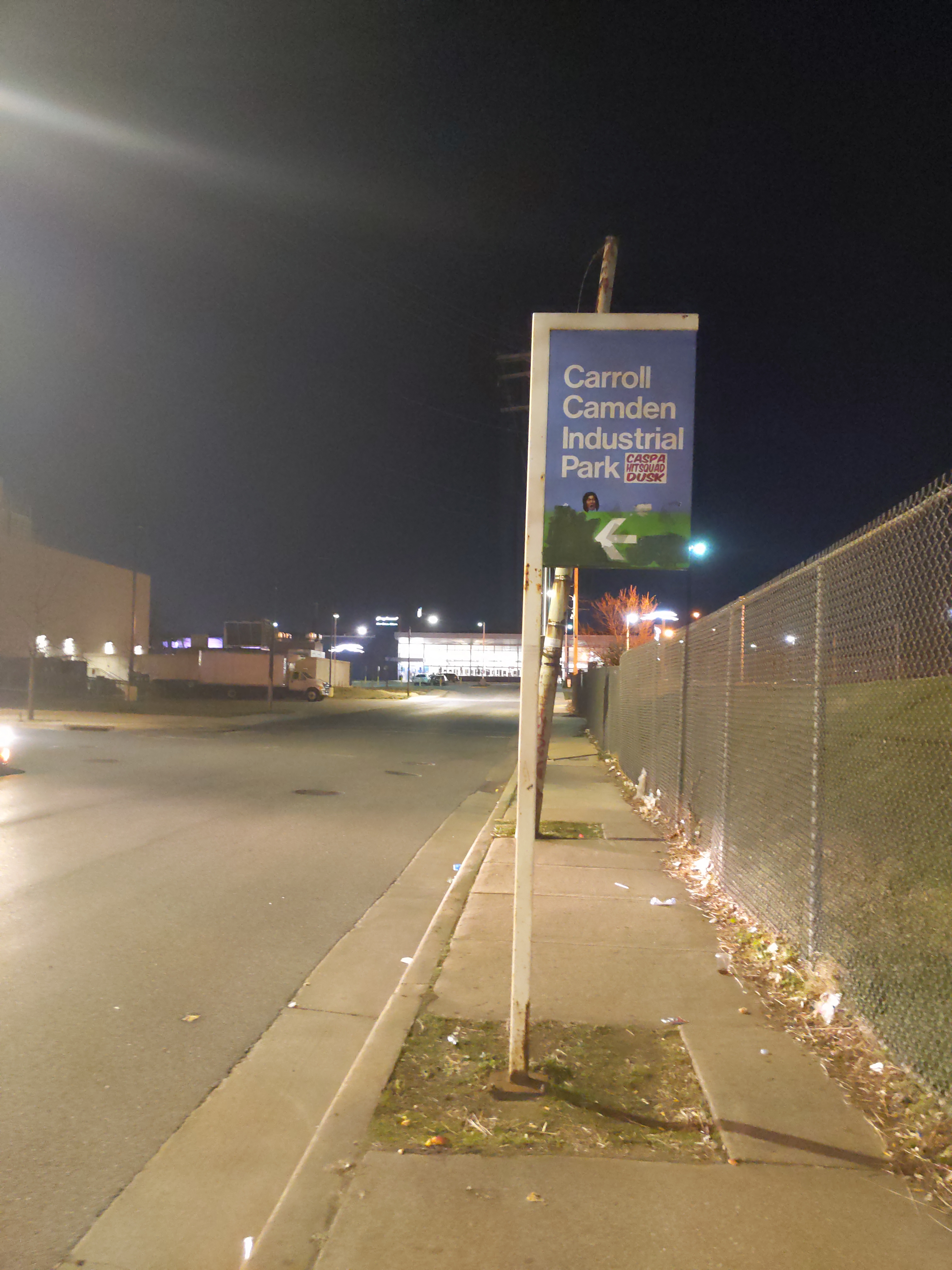
- Guidepost sign pointing an entry to the Carroll-Camden Industrial Area from Russell Street in Baltimore

- Location within Baltimore Location within Maryland Location within the United States
- Coordinates: 39.2726°N 76.6384°W
- Country: United States
- State: Maryland
- City: Baltimore
- Time zone: UTC−5 (Eastern)
  - Summer (DST): UTC−4 (EDT)
- Area Codes: 410, 443, 667

Carroll-Camden Industrial Area is a neighborhood in southwest Baltimore, Maryland.
