= Abell, Baltimore =

- Charles Village – Abell Historic District
- U.S. National Register of Historic Places
- U.S. Historic district
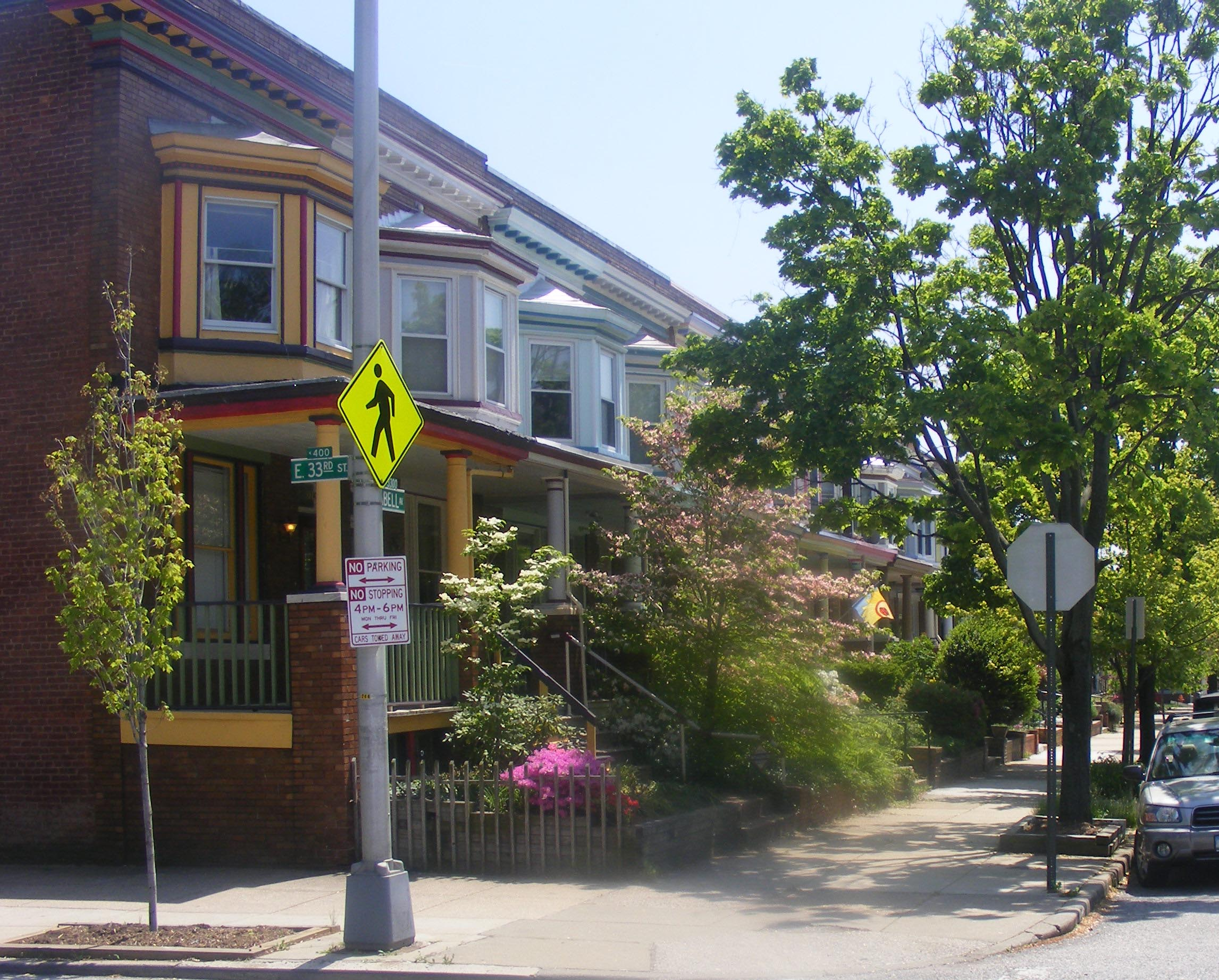
- Corner of Abell Ave. and 33rd St.

- Location within Baltimore Location within Maryland Location within the United States
- Location: Baltimore, Maryland
- Coordinates: 39°19′28.1″N 76°36′39.4″W
- NRHP reference No.: 83003629
- Added to NRHP: December 15, 1983

Abell is a neighborhood located in the north-central area of Baltimore, Maryland, U.S. It is a part of the larger neighborhood of Charles Village.

== Architecture ==
Abell is a predominantly residential community that structurally conforms to a grid street pattern established in the area during the first quarter of the 20th century. However, remnants of earlier diagonal roads still exist in the neighborhood—today's Merryman Lane, and the truncated Vineyard Lane, both of which are in the northeast section of the area.

The Abell neighborhood, like Abell Avenue, derives its name from the Abell family, longtime owners of The Baltimore Sun newspapers. The Abell family owned a large summer estate known as Guilford, which was located a short distance north of today's Abell community.

The majority of residential structures in Abell are row houses of medium-to-large size. East of Barclay Street in the northern portion are a number of interesting late-19th-century individual frame structures which remain from the former Victorian-era village of Waverly. Scattered throughout the community are a number of small apartment buildings. Mixed residential and commercial uses are prevalent along Greenmount Avenue. Since the 1950s, portions of the community's southeast section have been dedicated to light industrial and educational use.

Early in its development, during the 1920s and 1920s, Abell was known for its well-constructed row houses and such plumbing amenities as running water and indoor sanitary provisions. Daylight houses, which allowed light into all rooms, were built mostly by Edward J. Storck in the northern blocks. Areas to the south were developed with bay window, porch-front row houses. These new blocks were advertised as being in the Guilford area, thereby capitalizing on their proximity to that wealthier neighborhood to the north.

== History ==
The Abell community was part of the original "Huntington" tract of' 136 acres (0.55 km^{2}) laid out for Tobias Stanboro in 1688. The early subdivision of Huntington had brought into being a number of attractive country seats including a few in the Abell neighborhood.

=== Oriole Park ===
In 1889 a portion of the land near 29th Street and Greenmount Avenue was used as a baseball park—the first Oriole Park. However, this was abandoned two years later because it was considered too far out from the city. In 1914 Terrapin Park was established north of 29th Street at Greenmount Avenue as a ballpark for the Federal League's Baltimore Orioles, and the field was renamed Oriole Park. The lives of many local children revolved around the dramatic presence of baseball in their community. In 1937 a new scoreboard, as tall as a 3 1/2-story building and as wide as four houses, was erected and billed as the largest scoreboard in the world, its ability to display all the important operations of the game using electricity was a marvel of the time.

When a six-alarm nighttime fire destroyed the wooden stands and buildings in 1944, 1,500 people had to flee the neighborhood. The intense heat melted asphalt on 29th Street and tar on nearby roofs. The Orioles moved to the twenty-year-old Baltimore Municipal Stadium, and Barclay Street was cut through the old Oriole Park site. For years the land stood vacant and was used as a playground. During the mid-1950s, commercial and warehouse structures were built along the eastern portion, and the Barclay (originally Barclay Elementary, then Middle) School, #54, was built to the west in 1959.

=== Huntington Baptist Church ===
An important local landmark originally part of the early Waverly community still exists in Abell. The Huntington Baptist Church, at the northeast corner of 31st Street and Barclay Street, was founded in 1836 as a small Sabbath school for convalescent soldiers. Throughout the early 19th century men from Ft. McHenry were moved to the higher and healthier atmosphere of the Abell area, near the intersection of Old and New York Roads, to escape the threat of malaria. Occasionally, convalescing soldiers from the barracks would attend Baptist services in private homes of the neighborhood. A Sabbath school was established nearby in an old barracks building in 1836. Alternate visiting ministers preached weekly sermons for soldiers and a few civilians. In 1846 James Wilson, a large landowner in the area, erected a small chapel which he called the Huntington Baptist Church. The congregation grew steadily until it required a new building in 1873. Modeled after Talmage's Tabernacle in Brooklyn, it was covered with corrugated iron plates. In service for fifty years, the old tabernacle landmark was replaced in 1922 with the present church. As of 2017 the building is home to Saint Moses Church, a non-denominational congregation.

== Demographics ==
Historical population
Census	Pop.	Note	%±
2010	889		—
2020	975		9.7%
Source: Baltimore Department of Planning

At the 2020 U.S. census, Abell had a population of 975. Racially, it was 65% white, 17% black or African American, 8% of two races, 7% Asian, and 1% some other race. Hispanic or Latino people of any race comprised 5%. It had 503 housing units, of which 453 were occupied and 50 were vacant.

At the 2010 census, Abell had a population of 889. 68% were white, 24% were black or African American, 4% were Asian, and 2% were of two or more races. 3% were Hispanic or Latino. Of its 515 housing units, 440 were occupied and 75 were vacant.

== See also ==
- List of Baltimore neighborhoods
