= Charles Village, Baltimore =

Charles Village
- Neighborhood of Baltimore
- Interactive map of Charles Village
- Country: United States
- State: Maryland
- City: Baltimore
- Established: 1897 as Peabody Heights; 1967 as Charles Village

Population (2010)
  - Total: 8,267
  - Density: 25,159/sq mi (9,714/km^{2})
- Demonym: Charles Villager
- Time zone: UTC-5 (Eastern)
  - Summer (DST): EDT
- ZIP code: 21218
- Area code: 410, 443, and 667
- Website: charlesvillage.net
- Charles Village-Abell Historic District
- U.S. National Register of Historic Places
- U.S. Historic district
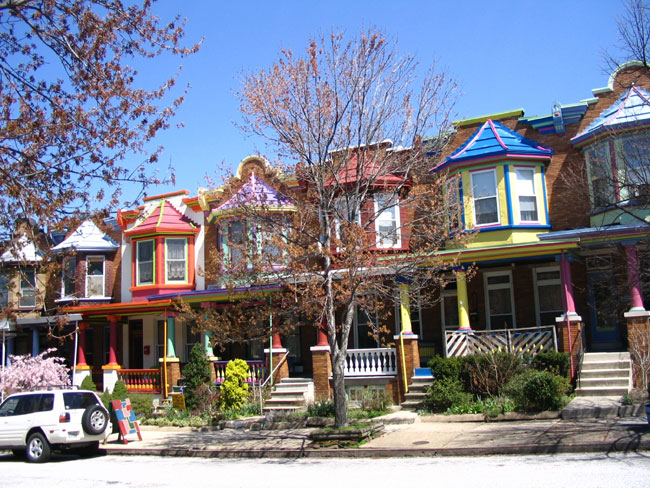
- Guilford Avenue rowhouses
- Location: Roughly bounded by University Parkway, Guilford Ave., and 25th, Mace, Charles, and Barclay Sts., Baltimore, Maryland
- Coordinates: 39°19′27″N 76°36′55″W
- Area: 175 acres (71 ha)
- Built: 1868
- Architect: Multiple
- NRHP reference No.: 83003629
- Added to NRHP: December 15, 1983

Charles Village is a neighborhood located in the north-central area of Baltimore, Maryland, USA. It is a diverse, eclectic, international, largely middle-class area with many single-family homes that is in proximity to many of Baltimore's cultural amenities. Nearby are the Baltimore Museum of Art, the Homewood campus of The Johns Hopkins University, Olmstead's Wyman Park, the weekly Waverly Farmers Market, and the arts district, Station North. Homes are Baltimore brick and stone row houses, many dating from the 1890s. Running from downtown north is the historic boulevard, Charles Street, where Baltimore's Easter Promenade once took place.

The development of the neighborhood began in 1869 when 50 acres (200,000 m^{2}) of land were purchased for development as "Peabody Heights." The land was divided and turned over to various builders who constructed home exteriors, leaving the interiors to be custom built according to buyer specifications. The area was first developed as a streetcar suburb in the early 20th century, and is thought to be the first community to employ tract housing tactics. At the time, the area was known as Peabody Heights; the moniker Charles Village, derived from Charles Street, the area's major north–south corridor, was coined in the 1970s as the beginning of a process of conceptually grouping a large and somewhat heterogeneous area. The neighborhood history has been researched and published by Gregory J. Alexander and Paul K. Williams in their book Charles Village: A Brief History (The History Press, 2009).

Charles Village in a strict sense consists of the area immediately to the east and south of the Johns Hopkins University Homewood campus. However, smaller neighborhoods to the east of this area — including Abell and Harwood, are considered by residents and other Baltimoreans to be part of Greater Charles Village. The Charles Village Community Benefits District (CVCBD) covers a hundred-block area generally bounded by 33rd Street to the north, Greenmount Avenue to the east, 25th Street (east of Guilford) and 20th Street (west of Guilford) to the south, and Johns Hopkins and Howard Street to the west. This area contains over 14,000 people and 700 businesses. The Charles Village Community Benefits District Management Authority (CVCBDMA) is a public entity that provides services within the CVCBD.

== Residents ==
Charles Village' is known for its proximity to the Johns Hopkins Homewood Campus. Many of the university's staff and students live in the neighborhood, particularly in the areas immediately adjacent to the campus. As a result, Charles Village has for the past several decades attracted a large population of artists and bohemians. The area is known to be one of the more racially diverse neighborhoods in a city that was segregated for decades. The neighborhood in general becomes more affluent as you travel from south to north and from east to west.

== Housing stock ==
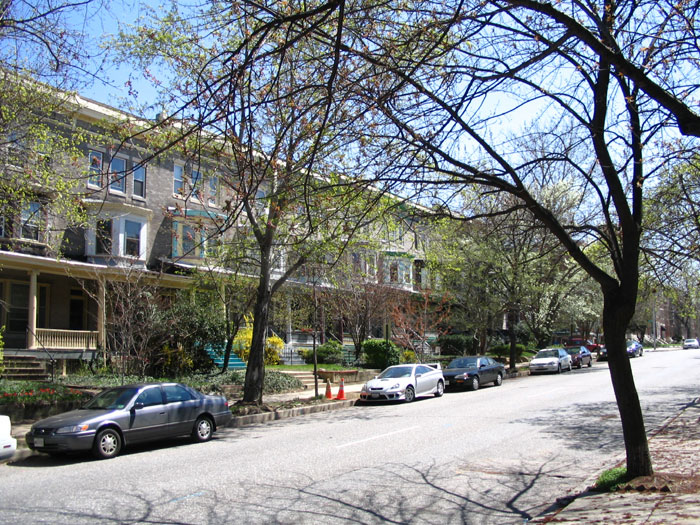
Calvert Street

Though there are a number of apartment buildings, much of Charles Village's housing stock consists of two- and three-story rowhouses built in the early 20th century. Many of the houses have been well maintained and, along with the rest of the city, the neighborhood has seen a boom in real estate prices in the first half of the 2000s. Some of the larger rowhouses have been converted into multi-unit apartment houses in more recent decades.

== Amenities and future development ==
The neighborhood includes several small commercial districts and is within walking distance to the well-attended Waverly farmer's market. However, unlike many of the trendier neighborhoods in the city, there are few large-scale retail areas. That is in the process of changing, however, as two blocks of St. Paul Street in the northern part of the neighborhood have been completely redeveloped.

On October 21, 2006, the first phase of a new development project was completed: a Barnes & Noble bookstore opened as an anchor to the retail space of a new dorm building, called Charles Commons, for Hopkins students. The project, completed in 2007, converted a stretch of rowhouses and small apartment buildings to the 600+ capacity dorm as well as multi-story condominiums, all of which contain ground-floor retail. The Barnes & Noble now serves both as the Johns Hopkins student bookstore and as a standard retail outlet for residents of North Baltimore City.

== The Benefits District ==
The Charles Village Community Benefits District Management Authority (CVCBDMA) is a special taxing district, one of four in Baltimore, the others being the Midtown Benefits District in Mount Vernon, the Downtown Partnership and the Waterfront Partnership. The CVCBD's geographical boundaries include four neighborhoods in the northern part of the city: Charles Village, Harwood, Abell and Old Goucher. Property owners within the CVCBDMA pay 12 cents per $100 of assessed value over and above city taxes to support the supplemental sanitation and safety services provided by the District.

The CVCBD was formed in 1994 through the efforts of the Charles Village Civic Association (CVCA), led by its then-president Ed Hargadon; the South Charles Village Business Association, led at the time by the managing partner of Whitman, Requardt & Associates, Tom Shafer; and the Greater Homewood Community Corporation (GHCC), whose executive director was former CVCA president Sandra Sparks. Shafer had been spurred into action by the 1992 murder of an employee in the company parking lot. He had pursued Benefits District legislation in the 1993 General Assembly without success, enjoying community support from GHCC but not from the CVCA. CVCA's decision to come on board in 1994 made it possible to pass the enabling legislation in the 1994 Maryland General Assembly, the City Council ordinance later that summer, and then a neighborhood referendum in October of that year. In the referendum, which was conducted using mail-in ballots by the Baltimore City Board of Elections, all registered voters and property owners were eligible to vote, and about 1,500 did so, and about two-thirds voted for the creation of the Benefits District.

Prior to 2006, the CVCBDMA provided a wide range of services to the community allowable under the enabling legislation. In addition to supplemental sanitation and safety services (including a security patrol), these included housing code enforcement, low-interest loans for residential and commercial revitalization, Painted Ladies contests, facade improvement matching grants, neighborhood festivals, and security cameras. Other than supplemental safety and sanitation, most services and activities were financed by grants awarded to the CVCBD but passed through an associated 501(c)3 nonprofit, the Charles Village Community Foundation.

Beginning in 2006, the CVCBDMA began to divest its housing and economic revitalization programs, transferring them to the Greater Homewood Community Corporation. In 2009, it also eliminated the "safety patrol" program because it was too costly and ineffective, replacing it with a community based safety program involving safety workshops for residents, victim's advocacy, and a neighborhood walkers on patrol program.

This restructuring led to a reduction in the CVCBDMA reliance on grants. The CVCBDMA now relies primarily on the surcharge tax and a regular grant from the Johns Hopkins University and has focused its mission and financial resources on providing supplemental sanitation and community-based safety services, carried out by its in-house staff. It also supports and organizes community activities that promote the District.

== Koreatown ==
There is a small portion of lower Charles Village that is sometimes referred to as Koreatown or Little Korea and is home to a number of Korean restaurants, but it has not been officially designated as a Koreatown. This informal Koreatown is bound on the north by 24th Street, on the south by North Avenue, on the west by Maryland Avenue, and on the east by St. Paul Street. Korean international students coming from the nearby Johns Hopkins University provide a constant stream of diners seeking Korean comfort food at the Korean restaurants of Charles Village. A Korean grocery store, the Far East House, formerly existed in Charles Village at 33 W. North Avenue.

== Little Appalachia ==
Historically, a portion of Charles Village was colloquially known as "Little Appalachia" and was home to Southern and Appalachian migrants to Baltimore. The neighborhood was roughly bounded by Charles Street to the west, Calvert Street to the east, 20th Street to the south, and 25th Street to the north. Little Appalachia was home to renowned bluegrass musician Hazel Dickens. Appalachian migrants living in Hampden began to settle in Lower Charles Village after World War II. Many of these newcomers were left unemployed after the sailcloth industry went under.

== Transportation ==
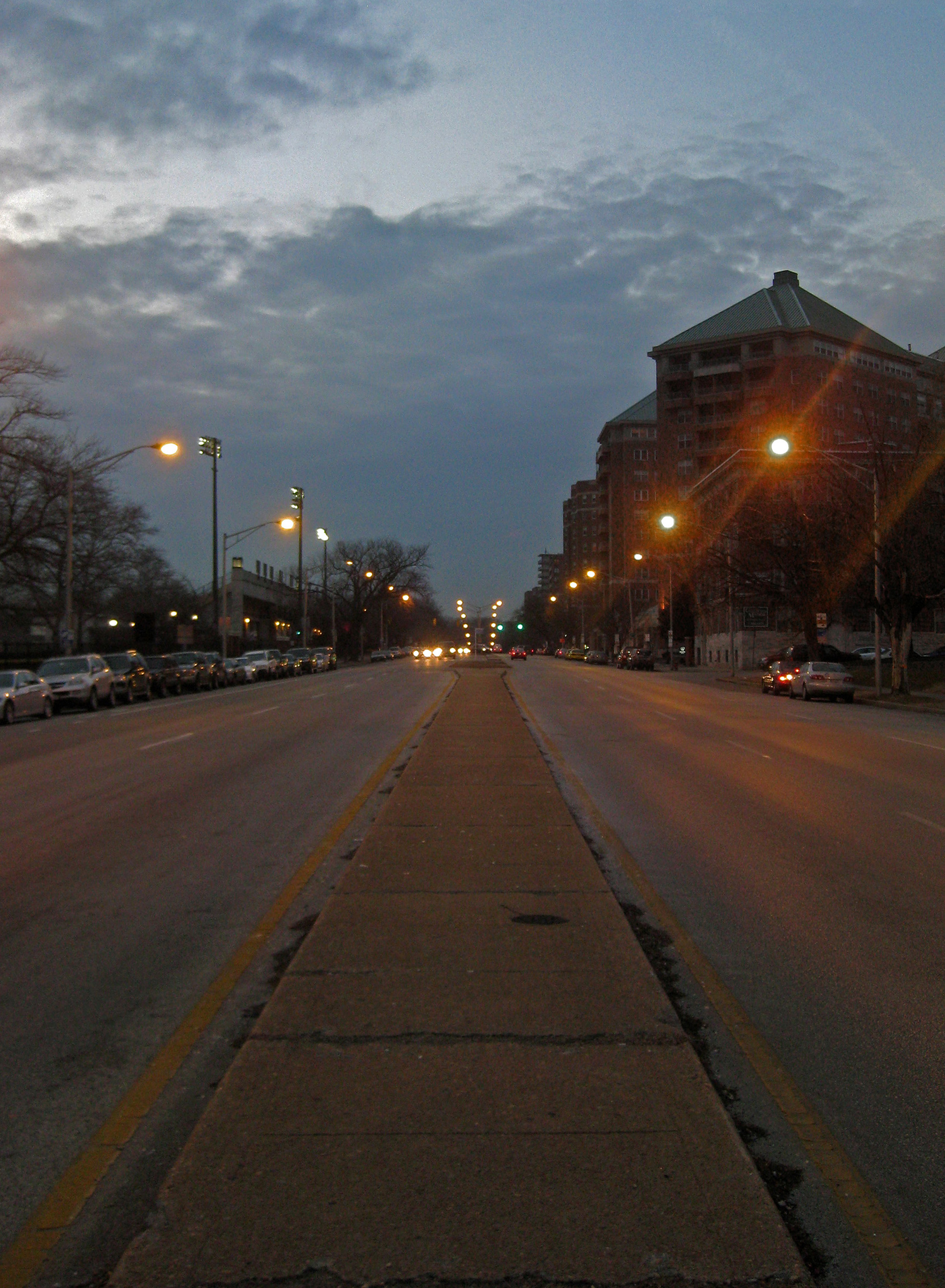
University Parkway borders the Johns Hopkins University Homewood campus

MTA Maryland's Route 11 and Route 3 buses are the two major mass transportation options in Charles Village, while Route 8 runs down Greenmount Avenue, just to the East of the neighborhood; all three lines eventually converge in the northern suburb of Towson. Route 61 and Route 64 buses, which are weekday-only buses intended primarily for commuters, also travel through the area. As of October 2015, the Charm City Circulator now serves Charles Village on St. Paul St. and Charles St. through 33rd St. Charles Village is not served by either of Baltimore's rapid transit systems. The silver line and Bus 95 also run Downton on St. Paul St. and uptown on North Charles St. The line reaches Morgan State University in the north and Curtis Bay in the south. Bus 51 runs Downtown on Maryland Ave.

The neighborhood also has the Johns Hopkins Shuttle which runs from the Homewood campus to the Johns Hopkins Hospital in East Baltimore. The shuttle primarily serves students and faculty at the university.

Charles and Saint Paul Streets, two one-way streets that together comprise one of central Baltimore's main north–south corridors, pass through the middle of Charles Village, and are both signed as Maryland Route 139; two other major corridors, Howard Street and Greenmount Avenue, bound the neighborhood on the west and east, respectively. The area is also only a short drive from the Jones Falls Expressway (I-83).

== Demographics ==
As of the census of 2000, there were 7,925 people living in the neighborhood. The racial makeup of Charles Village was 58.9% White, 22.5% African American, 0.3% Native American, 13.6% Asian, 1.3% from other races, and 3.6% from two or more races. Hispanic or Latino of any race were 3.7% of the population. 12.9% of occupied housing units were owner-occupied. 16.3% of housing units were vacant.

62.8% of the population were employed, 2.5% were unemployed, and 34.7% were not in the labor force. The median household income was $20,324. About 20.2% of families and 31.7% of the population were below the poverty line.

== See also ==
- List of Baltimore neighborhoods
