= Coldspring, Baltimore =

Coldspring Coldspring
- Neighborhood of Baltimore
- Location within Baltimore
- Coordinates: 39°20′50.49″N 76°39′15.36″W
- Country: United States
- State: Maryland
- City: Baltimore

Area
  - Total: 0.638 sq mi (1.65 km^{2})
  - Land: 0.638 sq mi (1.65 km^{2})

Population (2011)
  - Total: 1,308
  - Density: 2,050/sq mi (792/km^{2})
- Time zone: UTC-5 (Eastern)
  - Summer (DST): UTC-4 (EDT)
- ZIP code: 21209
- Area code: 410, 443, and 667

Coldspring, also known as Cold Spring, is a neighborhood in the North District of Baltimore, US, located between Cylburn (west) and the Village of Cross Keys (east). Its boundaries are drawn by West Northern Parkway (north), Greenspring Avenue (west), Jones Falls Expressway (east) and West Cold Spring Lane (south). Cold Spring Park covers about two-thirds of the neighborhood, running from Cold Spring's northern tip, where the Jones Falls Expressway crosses over West Northern Parkway, and overlapping the neighborhood's southern edge at West Cold Spring Lane.

The Jones Falls Trail passes through Cold Spring on its 10-mile course between Mount Washington and the Inner Harbor, with a branch of the trail extending to the Cylburn Arboretum in Cold Spring Park.

== Demographics ==
The population of Cold Spring was estimated to be 1,308 in 2011, of which 86.3 percent were black and 11.4 percent were white. Median household income for Cold Spring was estimated at $57,713, which was significantly higher than the city-wide median of $38,721. However, 12.3 percent of Cold Spring residents were living below the poverty level in 2011.

== Public transportation ==
CityLink Navy (BaltimoreLink) provides local transit bus service in Cold Spring along Greenspring Avenue traveling between Sinai Hospital and Fort McHenry.

== See also ==
- List of Baltimore neighborhoods
