= Maryland Legislative District 43 =

American legislative district

Coordinates: 39°20′N 76°36′W

Maryland's legislative district 43
- Represents part of the City of Baltimore
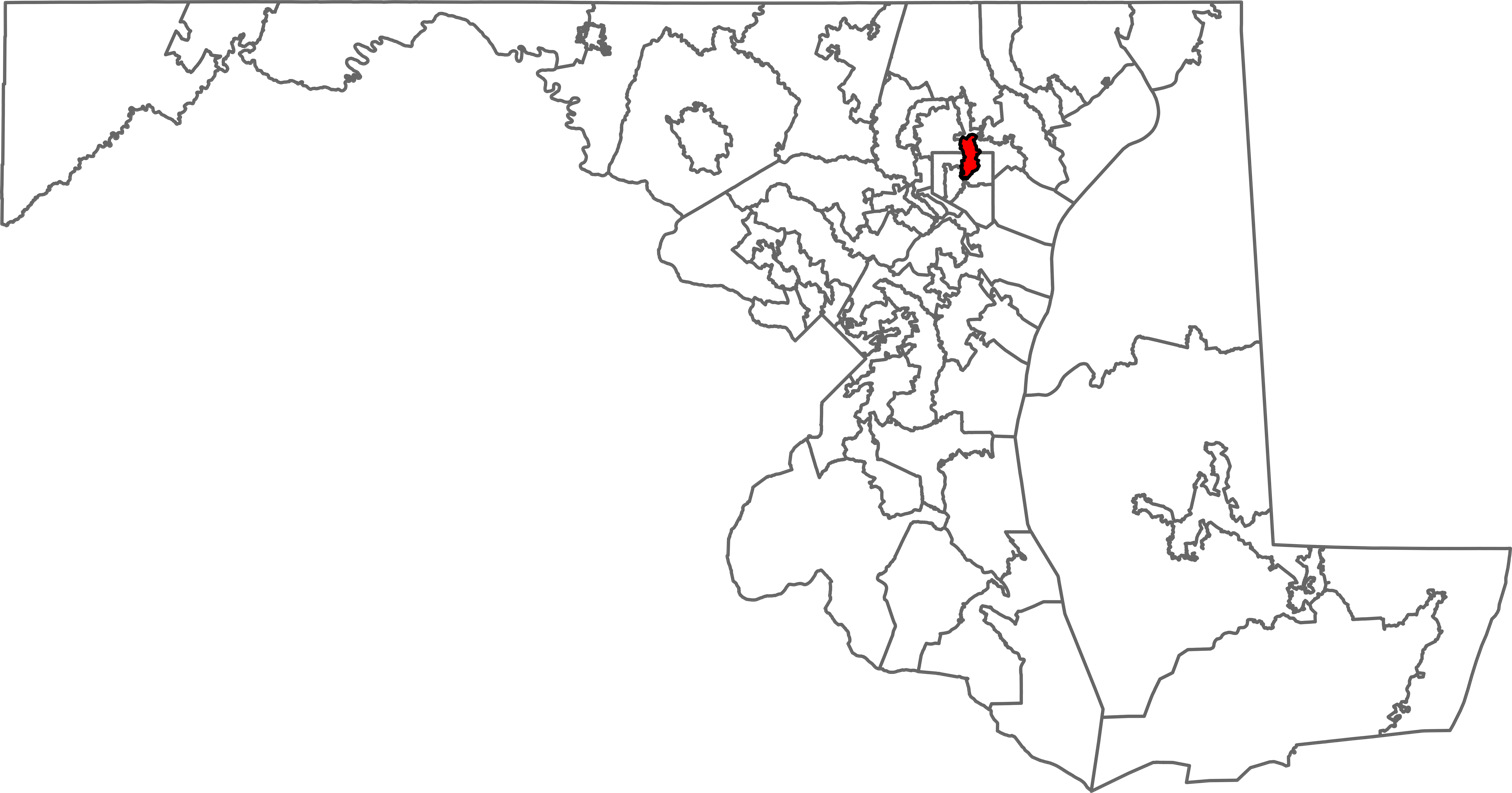
- Senator: Mary L. Washington (D)
- Delegate(s): Elizabeth Embry (D) (District 43A); Regina T. Boyce (D) (District 43A); Cathi Forbes (D) (District 43B)
- Registration: 81.3% Democratic; 5.4% Republican; 12.0% unaffiliated
- Demographics: 26.9% White; 59.3% Black/African American; 0.2% Native American; 6.1% Asian; 0.0% Hawaiian/Pacific Islander; 2.0% Other race; 5.4% Two or more races; 4.5% Hispanic
- Population (2020): 109,154
- Voting-age population: 90,503
- Registered voters: 77,644

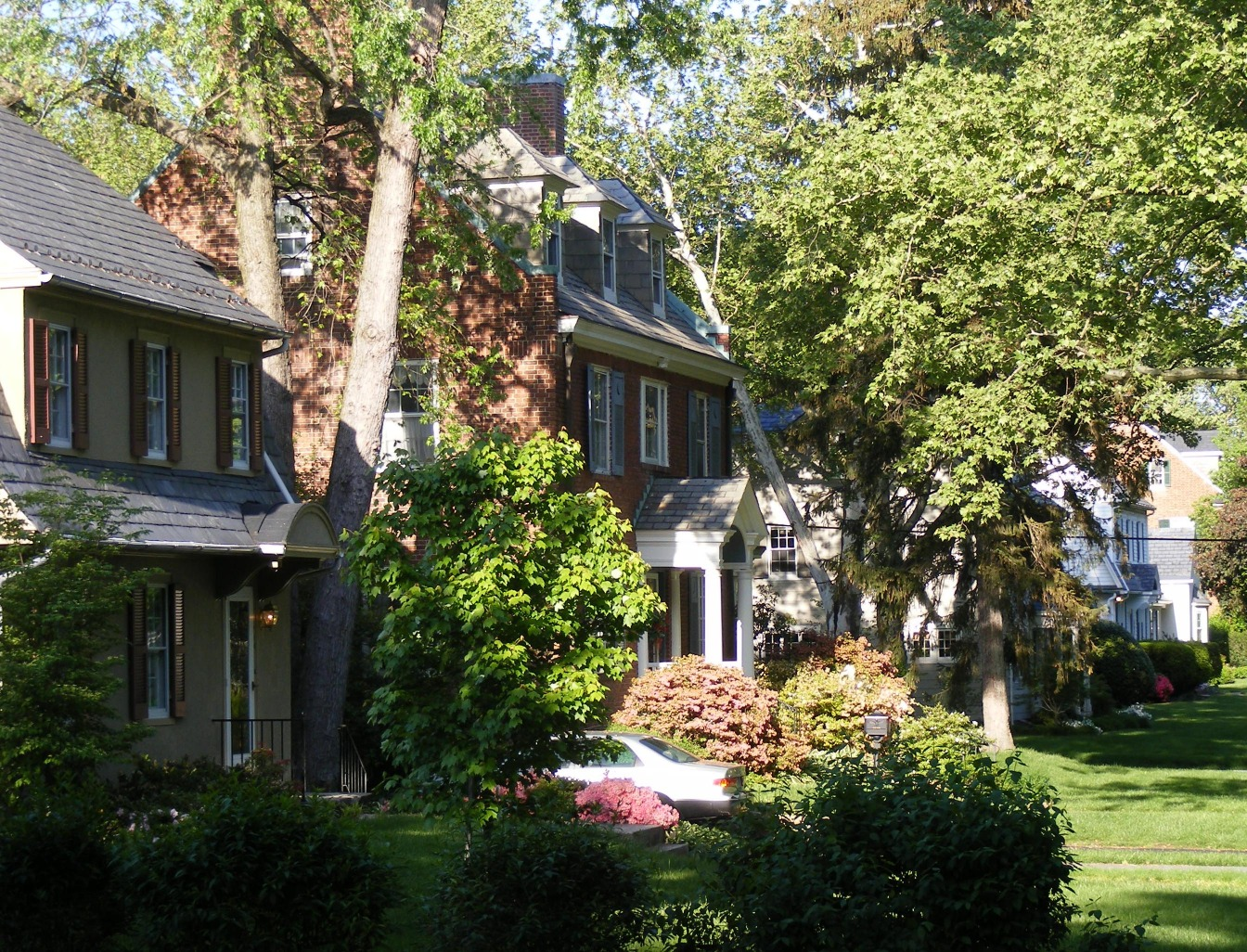
Cedarcroft is one of the many communities in the 43rd district

Maryland Legislative District 43 is one of 47 legislative districts in the state of Maryland and one of the 5 located entirely within Baltimore City. The neighborhoods of Abell, Cedarcroft, Charles Village, Coldstream-Homestead-Montebello, Ednor Gardens-Lakeside, Guilford, Homeland, Hillen, Lake Evesham, Lauraville, Mid-Govans, Northwood, Pen Lucy, Radnor-Winston, Ramblewood, Stonewood-Pentwood-Winston, Tuscany-Canterbury, Waverly, Wilson Park and Woodbourne Heights, Baltimore make up the majority of the district. The district is divided into two sub-districts for the Maryland House of Delegates: District 43A and District 43B.

== Demographic characteristics ==
As of the 2020 United States census, the district had a population of 109,154, of whom 90,503 (82.9%) were of voting age. The racial makeup of the district was 29,325 (26.9%) White, 64,733 (59.3%) African American, 242 (0.2%) Native American, 6,646 (6.1%) Asian, 26 (0.0%) Pacific Islander, 2,220 (2.0%) from some other race, and 5,947 (5.4%) from two or more races. Hispanic or Latino of any race were 4,873 (4.5%) of the population.

The district had 77,644 registered voters as of October 17, 2020, of whom 9,308 (12.0%) were registered as unaffiliated, 4,222 (5.4%) were registered as Republicans, 63,099 (81.3%) were registered as Democrats, and 541 (0.7%) were registered to other parties.

== Educational institutions ==
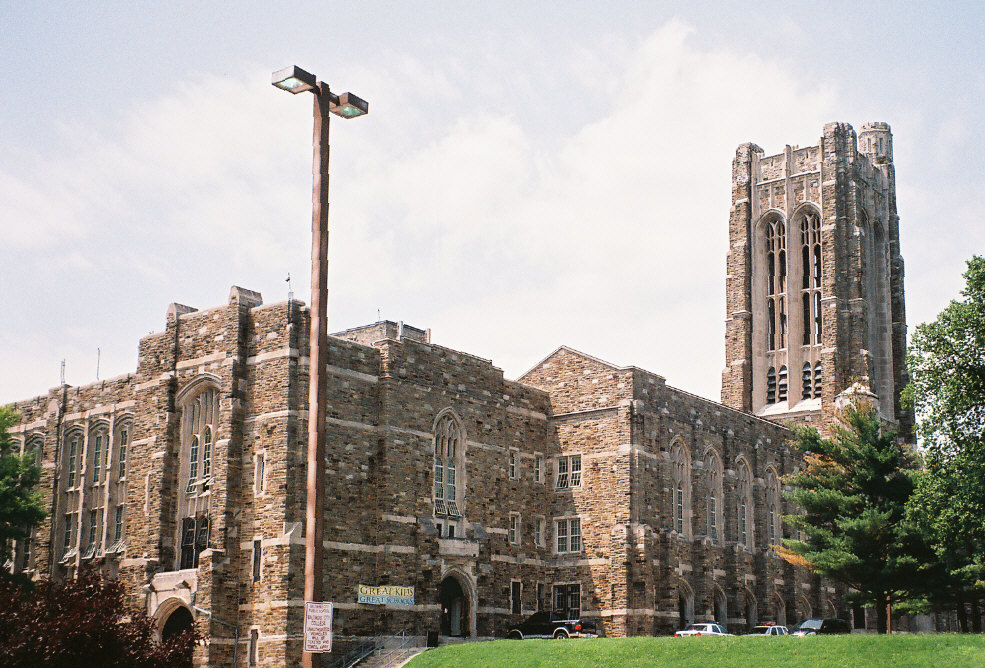
Baltimore City College high school

=== Universities ===
Several of Maryland's larger institutions of higher education are located within the 43rd district. With the district being redrawn in 2012 per the 2010 census, most of the Johns Hopkins University Homewood campus is in the 43rd. The district also includes Morgan State University, Loyola University Maryland and the Notre Dame of Maryland University.

=== High schools ===
The 43rd district is also home to Baltimore City College, the oldest high school in Maryland. Other high schools in the district include: W. E. B. Du Bois High School, Mergenthaler Vocational-Technical High School, Reginald F. Lewis High School and the Baltimore Career Academy.

== Elected representatives ==
The district is represented for the 2023–2027 legislative term in the State Senate by Mary L. Washington (D) and in the House of Delegates by Elizabeth Embry (D, District 43A), Regina T. Boyce (D, District 43A), and Cathi Forbes (D, District 43B).

== Election results ==
2018 Race for Maryland House of Delegates – 43rd District Voters to choose three:
Name	Votes	Percent	Outcome
Curt Anderson, Democratic			
Regina T. Boyce, Democratic			
Maggie McIntosh, Democratic			
Bonnie "Raven" Lane, Green			

2014 Race for Maryland House of Delegates – 43rd District Voters to choose three:
Name	Votes	Percent	Outcome
Curt Anderson, Democratic	23,046	34.1%	Won
Maggie McIntosh, Democratic	22,310	33.0%	Won
Mary L. Washington, Democratic	21,800	32.3%	Won
Greg Dorsey (write-in)	128	0.2%	Lost
Other Write-Ins	267	0.4%	Lost

2010 Race for Maryland House of Delegates – 43rd District Voters to choose three:
Name	Votes	Percent	Outcome
Curt Anderson, Democratic	24,831	35.1%	Won
Maggie McIntosh, Democratic	23,266	32.9%	Won
Mary L. Washington, Democratic	22,334	31.6%	Won
Other Write-Ins	312	0.4%	Lost

2006 Race for Maryland House of Delegates – 43rd District Voters to choose three:
Name	Votes	Percent	Outcome
Curt Anderson, Democratic	22,315	29.4%	Won
Maggie McIntosh, Democratic	22,093	29.1%	Won
Ann Marie Doory, Democratic	21,219	28.0%	Won
Armand F. Girard, Republican	3,425	4.5%	Lost
David G.S. Greene, Green	2,619	3.5%	Lost
Brandy Baker, Green	2,267	3.0%	Lost
Richard J. Ochs, Green	1,772	2.3%	Lost

2002 Race for Maryland House of Delegates – 43rd District Voters to choose three:
Name	Votes	Percent	Outcome
Maggie McIntosh, Democratic	21,993	32.5%	Won
Curt Anderson, Democratic	21,131	30.8%	Won
Ann Marie Doory, Democratic	19,999	29.15%	Won
John A. Heath, Republican	5,243	7.64%	Lost
Morning Sunday, Green (write-in)	152	.22%	Lost
Other Write-Ins	97	.14%	Lost
