= Hector L. Torres =

American politician

Hector L. Torres is a former Baltimore City Fire Department Battalion Chief and a Maryland Senate candidate in the 2010 Maryland General Assembly elections. Torres is running in the 43rd legislative district which is located in northwestern Baltimore and includes the neighborhoods of Abell, Cedarcroft, Coldstream-Homestead-Montebello, Ednor Gardens-Lakeside, Guilford, Hillen, Homeland, Lauraville, Mid-Govans, Northwood, Pen Lucy, Radnor-Winston, Ramblewood, Stonewood-Pentwood-Winston, Tuscany-Canterbury, Waverly and Woodbourne Heights. Torres has a long history of public service and Forbes.com called him "one of the area's most visible minority leaders."

== Background ==
Hector L. Torres was born in New York City and came to Maryland to attend Morgan State University where he received a B.A. in political science. After obtaining his degree Torres remained in Baltimore where he raised two children who still live in the city, one is a public school teacher and the other is a social worker.

== Career ==
Torres was a firefighter with the Baltimore City Fire Department for 29 years and rose to the rank of Battalion Chief and Public Information Officer. After retiring from work as a firefighter Torres worked for Catholic Charities as the Director of the Hispanic Apostolate/Immigration Legal Services and went on to become the Executive Director of the Governor's Commission on Hispanic Affairs. In 2009 he was appointed a commissioner for the Baltimore City Department of Planning.

Torres also became a First Mariner Bank board member in 2002 and founded his own small emergency management consulting business, Prosaber Consulting, in 2005.

Additionally Torres is currently on University of Maryland, Baltimore County Public Policy External Advisory Board, the University of Maryland School of Social Work board of visitors, and is a member of the Workforce Development Council of Baltimore County.

In June 2010 Torres filed for candidacy for Senator in the 43rd legislative district of Maryland where his challenge against incumbent Joan Carter Conway will be decided in the democratic primaries on September 14, 2010. Torres has been endorsed by Baltimore City councilman Bill Henry.
