= Glen Oaks, Baltimore =

Glen Oaks
- neighborhood statistical area
- Location within Baltimore
- Coordinates: 39.3666°N 76.5962°W
- Country: United States
- State: Maryland
- City: Baltimore

Area
  - Total: 0.352 sq mi (0.91 km^{2})
  - Land: 0.352 sq mi (0.91 km^{2})

Population (2009)
  - Total: 3,012
  - Density: 8,560/sq mi (3,300/km^{2})
- Time zone: UTC-5 (Eastern)
  - Summer (DST): UTC-4 (EDT)
- ZIP code: 21239 and 21212
- Area code: 410, 443, and 667

Glen Oaks is a neighborhood in the North District of Baltimore. Its boundaries form a slender, inverted triangle, with the city line as the neighborhood's northern base and Belvedere Shopping Center as its southern apex. Chinquapin Parkway (west) and The Alameda (east) draw the triangle's sides and cross at the neighborhood's southern tip.

Most of the homes in Glen Oaks are brick row houses, built in 1948 by Elba Construction, Inc.

The neighborhoods of Chinquapin Park-Belevedere, Lake Walker and Cameron Village are located to the west of Glen Oaks, on the opposite side Chinquapin Park. Idlewood, Ramblewood and Woodbourne Heights are located to the east, across The Alameda in the Northeast District.

MTA CityLink Yellow provides bus service along The Alameda, connecting Glen Oaks residents with Downtown Baltimore. MTA LocalLink 30 provides cross-town service along Belvedere Avenue.

Median household income for Glen Oaks in 2009 was estimated at $44,821, while the citywide median was only $38,772. Residents living below the poverty level were 12.5 percent of the Glen Oaks population and 22.9 percent of the Baltimore population. About 3/4 of the Glen Oaks population of 3,012 (census estimate for 2009) were black and almost 1/4 were white.

== See also ==
List of Baltimore neighborhoods
