= Stonewood =

Stonewood may refer to:

- Stonewood, West Virginia
- Stonewood-Pentwood-Winston, Baltimore
- Stonewood Center, a shopping mall located in Downey, California, United States
