= Cameron Village, Baltimore =

Cameron Village
- Neighborhood of Baltimore
- Location within Baltimore
- Coordinates: 39°21′21.73″N 76°35′56.85″W
- Country: United States
- State: Maryland
- City: Baltimore

Area
  - Total: 0.137 sq mi (0.35 km^{2})
  - Land: 0.137 sq mi (0.35 km^{2})

Population (2008)
  - Total: 1,623
  - Density: 11,800/sq mi (4,570/km^{2})
- Time zone: UTC-5 (Eastern)
  - Summer (DST): UTC-4 (EDT)
- ZIP code: 21212 and 21239
- Area code: 410, 443, and 667

Cameron Village is a neighborhood in the North District of Baltimore, located between the neighborhoods of Mid-Govans and Woodbourne Heights. Vaguely bell-shaped, its boundaries are marked by Bradhurst Road and E. Belvedere Avenue (north), Woodbourne Avenue (south), Lothian Road (west), and Northwood Drive (east).

== Public school history ==
Chinquapin Middle School, located at 900 Woodbourne Avenue in Cameron Village, was formerly known as Woodbourne Junior High School. It became the focus of controversy about prayer and Bible readings in public schools in 1960. Madalyn Murray O'Hair, whose son was attending Woodbourne Junior High School, filed a lawsuit against the city school system protesting compulsory Bible verse recitations and prayer in public schools. The Supreme Court ruled in her favor in the 1963 decision of Abington School District v. Schempp.

The city closed Chinquapin as a middle school in 2010, replacing it with the Baltimore IT Academy Transformation School, a new program operating in the same building. In the new program, students in grades 6-12 study a career-oriented curriculum emphasizing math and information technology.

== Public transportation ==
MTA CityLink Yellow provides bus service along Maryland Route 542 (The Alameda), passing through the southeast corner of Cameron Village. Along the neighborhood's northern edge, MTA LocalLink 30 has stops on E. Belvedere Avenue. The U.S. Census estimated that in 2009 about a third of the neighborhood's employed population relied on buses to get to work.

== Demographics ==
The 2000 census reported 16.9 percent of Cameron Village families with income below the poverty line, compared with a citywide average of 22.9 percent. Median household income for 2009 was estimated at $39,805 for Cameron Village, somewhat better than the Baltimore median of $38,772. Although predominantly black, Cameron Village also has significant white and Hispanic populations.

== See also ==
- Baltimore neighborhoods
