= Hector Torres (disambiguation) =

Héctor Torres may refer to:

- Héctor Torres, a former Major League Baseball player
- Hector Torres (designer), Puerto Rican fashion designer
- Héctor Torres Calderón, Puerto Rican politician
- Hector L. Torres, Maryland firefighter and political candidate
- Hector Torres (lawyer), a named partner at Kasowitz Benson Torres
