= Jahmar Young =

American basketball player (born 1986)

Personal information
- Born: November 18, 1986 (age 39) Baltimore, Maryland, U.S.
- Listed height: 6 ft 5 in (1.96 m)
- Listed weight: 185 lb (84 kg)

Career information
- High school: W.E.B. Du Bois (Baltimore, Maryland)
- College: New Mexico State (2007–2010)
- NBA draft: 2010: undrafted
- Playing career: 2010–2021
- Position: Shooting guard
- Number: 1, 2, 5, 10, 21

Career history
- 2010–2011: Crvena zvezda
- 2011: Spirou Charleroi
- 2011–2012: Ventspils
- 2012–2013: Orléans Loiret Basket
- 2013: Nizhny Novgorod
- 2013–2014: HKK Široki
- 2015: Sporting Al Riyadi Beirut
- 2015–2016: Paris-Levallois
- 2016: Sporting Al Riyadi Beirut
- 2017: Hapoel Haifa
- 2017: Huracanes del Atlántico
- 2017: Cibona
- 2018: Beirut Club
- 2018–2019: Hapoel Haifa
- 2019–2020: Hapoel Hevel Modi'in
- 2020: Hapoel Eilat
- 2020–2021: Klosterneuburg Dukes

Career highlights
- 2× First-team All-WAC (2009, 2010)

Jahmar Clinton Lamont Young (born November 18, 1986) is an American former professional basketball player. He played college basketball for New Mexico State before heading overseas to play professionally.

== Early life and college career ==
Young attended W. E. B. Du Bois High School in Baltimore, Maryland. He was rated as the No. 26 best prep recruit by hoopscooponline.com. As a youngster, he played for various AAU programs, including the DC Assault and Cecil Kirk. In 2004, Young averaged 18.3 points per game and shot 47.5 percent from the field in a four-game tournament for Cecil Kirk.

Young played college basketball at the New Mexico State University, where he averaged 20.2 points, 3.5 rebounds and 3.1 assists per game in his senior year. Young was named First-team All-WAC in 2009 and 2010.

== Professional career ==
In September 2010, he signed his first professional contract with Crvena zvezda of Serbia. In March 2011, he left Zvezda and signed with Spirou Charleroi of Belgium. He played only 3 games in the Belgian League.

In August 2011, he signed with BK Ventspils of the Latvian Basketball League for the 2011–12 season. In August 2012 he signed with Orléans Loiret Basket of the French LNB Pro A for the 2012–13 season.

In September 2013, he signed with Nizhny Novgorod of Russia. On October 19, 2013, he was released by Nizhny after appearing in only one game. In December 2013, he signed with HKK Široki of Bosnia and Herzegovina. In April 2014, he parted ways with Široki.

In January 2015, he signed with Sporting Al Riyadi Beirut of Lebanon.

On November 27, 2015, he signed with Paris-Levallois of the LNB Pro A. On February 16, 2016, he parted ways with Paris after appearing in ten games. On February 26, 2016, he re-signed with Sporting Al Riyadi Beirut.

On October 18, 2017, Young signed with Cibona of Croatia for the rest of the 2017–18 season, but the contract was terminated on November 22 of the same year. In January 2018, he signed with Beirut Club.

On October 24, 2018, Young returned to Hapoel Haifa for a second stint, signing a one-year deal. In 26 games played during the 2018–19 season, he finished the season as the league third best scorer with 22.6 points, to go with 2.7 rebounds, 4.6 assists and 1.4 steals per game.

On January 22, 2020, Young signed with Hapoel Hevel Modi'in as an injury cover for Deondre Parks.
