= Lake Evesham =

- Neighborhood of Baltimore
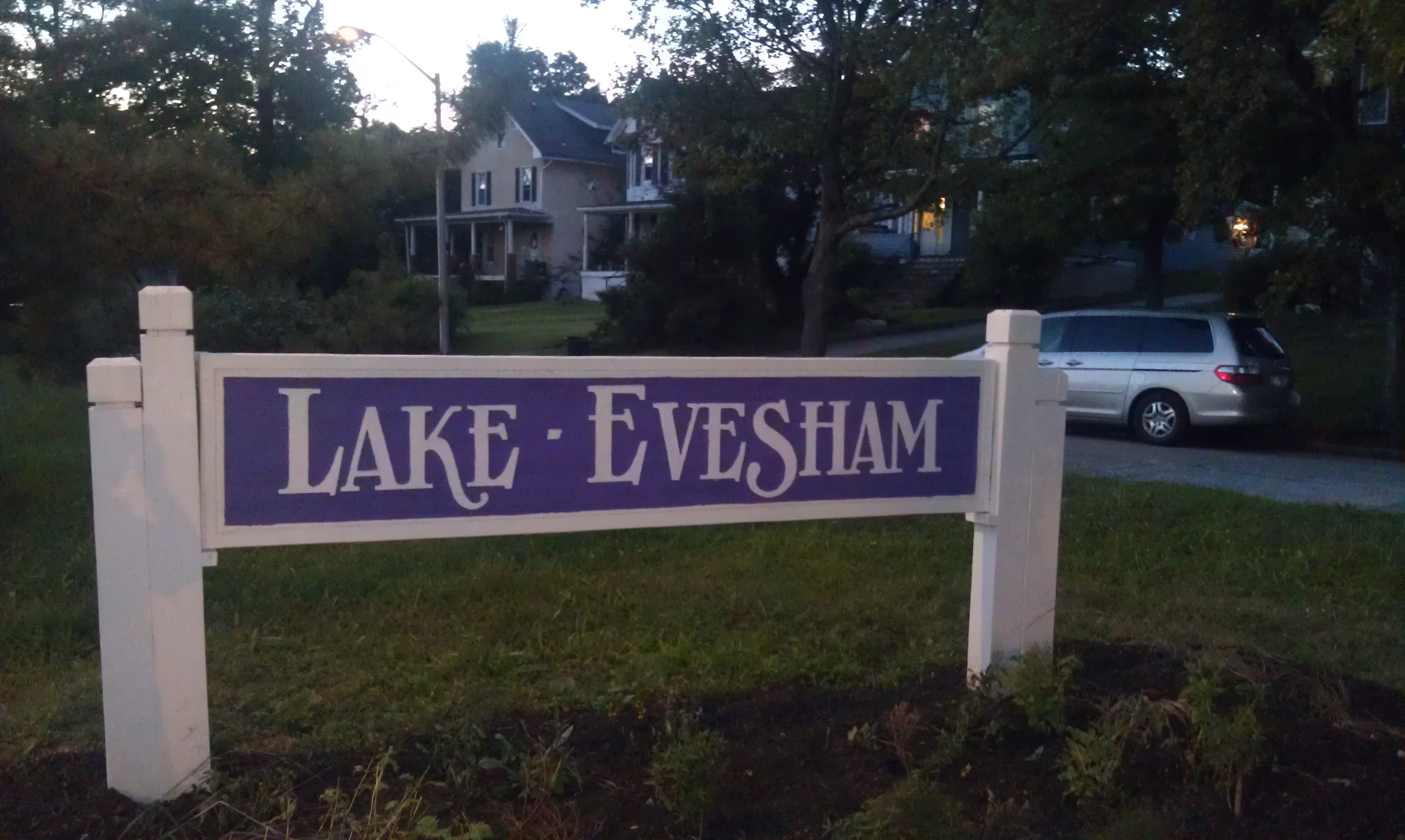
- Lake Evesham neighborhood welcome sign
- Country: United States
- State: Maryland
- City: Baltimore
- Time zone: UTC-5 (Eastern)
  - Summer (DST): EDT
- ZIP code: 21212
- Area code: 410, 443, and 667

Lake Evesham is a neighborhood in Baltimore, Maryland, comprising about 250 households. Many of its residents commute directly into Baltimore for work while others commute locally to Towson.

The neighborhood rests between Northern Parkway and York Road, thus making it close in proximity to Loyola University and Towson University. The neighborhood boasts an eclectic residential community of all ages and demographics. The Lake Evesham community is near Belvedere market as well the Senator Theatre.

Founded in the 1890s, Lake Evesham originally was joined with the community of Midwood in the 1870s. The property was split up and Lake Evesham was formed. The historic area developed from 1870-1940 and the architectural styles are evident of this. Various styles of the post-war era include bungalows, Victorian style facades and classic houses from the early 1900s.

== Government representation ==
State District	Congressional District	City Council District
43rd	3rd	4th
Anderson, Doory, McIntosh	Sarbanes	Henry

== See also ==
List of Baltimore neighborhoods
