= Guilford, Baltimore =

- Guilford Historic District
- U.S. National Register of Historic Places
- U.S. Historic district
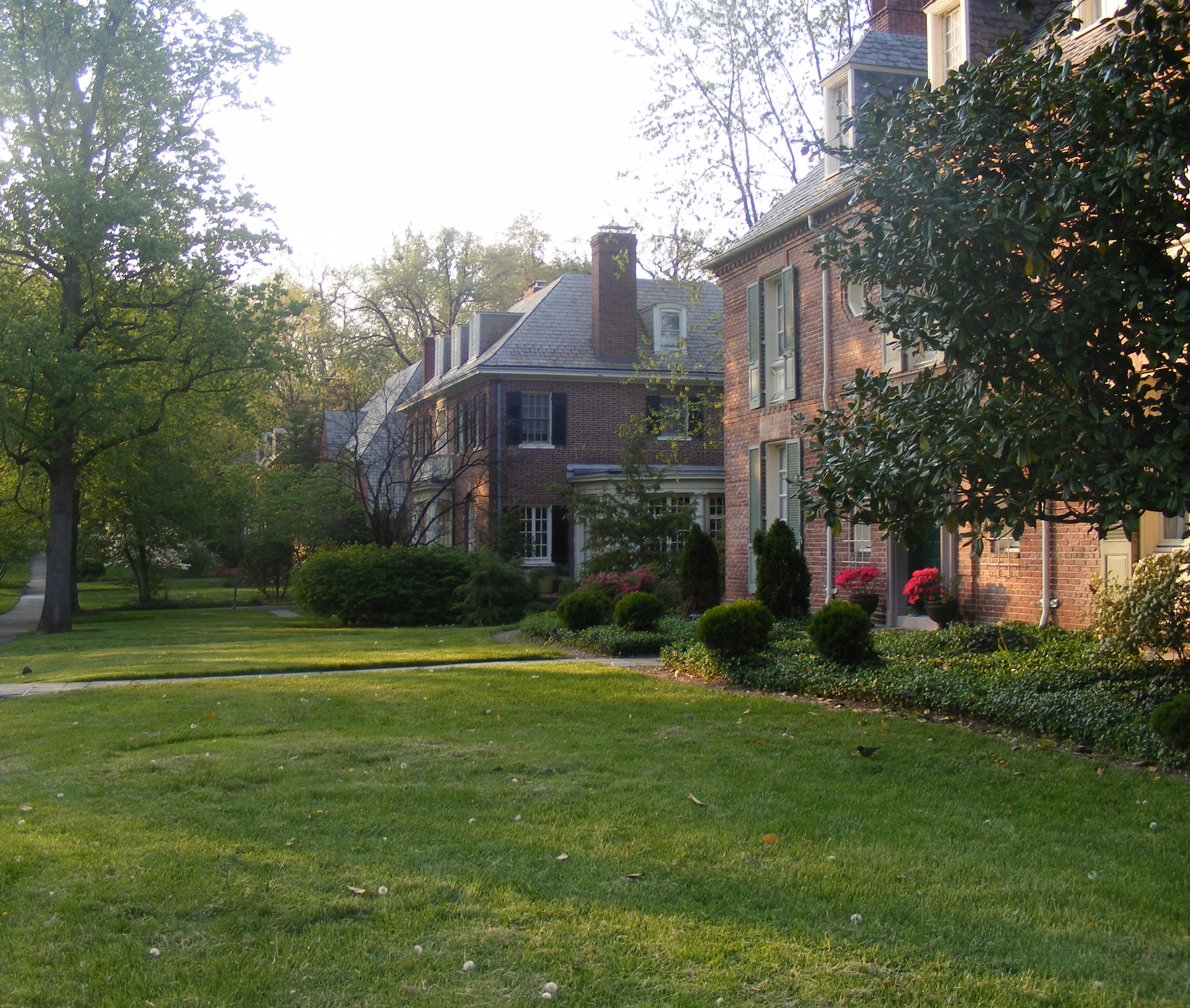
- Homes in Guilford

- Location within Baltimore Location within Maryland Location within the United States
- Location: Roughly bounded by N. Charles St., Warrenton Rd., Linkwood Rd., Cold Spring Ln., York Rd., Southway, University Parkway, and Bishops Rd., Baltimore, Maryland
- Coordinates: 39°20′31″N 76°37′00″W
- Area: 210 acres (85 ha)
- Architect: Multiple
- Architectural style: Colonial Revival, Classical Revival, et al.
- NRHP reference No.: 01000745
- Added to NRHP: July 19, 2001

Guilford is a historic neighborhood in the northern part of Baltimore, Maryland.

It is bounded on the south by University Parkway, on the west by North Charles Street, Warrenton and Linkwood Roads, on the north by Cold Spring Lane and on the east by York Road/Greenmount Avenue.

The neighborhood is adjacent to the neighborhoods of Tuscany-Canterbury, Loyola-Notre Dame, Kernewood, Wilson Park, Pen Lucy, Waverly, Oakenshawe, Charles Village.

Guilford is located near Johns Hopkins University, Loyola University Maryland and Notre Dame of Maryland University.

The neighborhood was added to the National Register of Historic Places in 2001.

== History ==
The first known resident of the area was General McDonald who fought for the Continental army during the Revolutionary War. The area was supposedly named after the Battle of Guilford Court House in North Carolina, in which McDonald was wounded. His son William McDonald inherited his estate in 1850 and built the Guilford Mansion. In 1872, the property was purchased by Baltimore Sun founder, Arunah S. Abell, and would remain in his family for 35 years.

In 1907, the property was purchased by the Guilford Park Company who wanted to develop the area into a sophisticated suburban neighborhood on the edge of expanding Baltimore. In 1911 they consolidated with the Roland Park Company and together purchased 210 acres in North Baltimore. Frederick Law Olmsted Jr. was hired to do the landscape and street design. He is responsible for giving the neighborhood its distinct curving streets and terrain. The plan included three parks, "Little Park," "Stratford Green, and "Sunken Park. In 1939 a fourth park was created called "Guilford Gateways."

The company spared no expense on utilities, streets, drains and other infrastructure to create a modern and an attractive living destination for the Baltimore elite. The houses were designed by some of the most prominent Baltimore architects of the era, included Edward L. Palmer, Bayard Turnbull, John Russell Pope, W. D. Lamdin and Laurence Hall Fowler. The houses were primarily built in brick or stone and were designed in the popular revival styles of the early 20th century.

In 1913, the new neighborhood opened to much local praise. After the completed sales of all the houses in Guilford, the Company allocated the Guilford Association to maintain the integrity of the neighborhood. The Association upholds the covenants of the Deed and Agreement left by the Roland Park Company; these included a racial covenant excluding African American property ownership until such covenants were deemed legally unenforceable.

Since 1965, Sherwood Gardens has been a park known for its annual tulip blooms. The land had initially been part of the estate of A.S. Abell in the 1800s, but by the 1920s and the development of the Guilford neighborhood, the land belonged to industrialist, John W. Sherwood. Sherwood began to plant tulips imported from the Netherlands, as well as other flowers. He also began the tradition of allowing the public to visit his garden each May. On Sherwood's death in 1965, the Guilford Association acquired the gardens and later transferred them to another 501(c)(3) organization, Stratford Green, Inc., which made the park accessible to the public year-round. It has become a significant tourist destination.

== Notable people ==
Notable residents of Guilford include:

- Max Brödel (1870–1941), medical illustrator.
- Maria Briscoe Croker (1875–1962), poet and first Poet Laureate of Maryland.
- Frederic Ogden Nash (1902–1971), poet and lyricist.
- Dawn Chanté Flythe Moore (born 1975), policy advisor, campaign strategist, philanthropist and First Lady of Maryland.
- Wes Moore (born 1978), veteran, entrepreneur, author, and governor of Maryland.
- Mabel Garrison Siemonn (1886–1963), opera singer.
- Henry Ernest Treide (1884–1969), industrialist and patron of the arts.
- Grace Turnbull (1880–1976), painter, sculptor and writer. Her Guilford house and studio were designed by her brother, Bayard, and still stand.
- Riccardo Giacconi (1931–2018), physicist and Nobel laureate (2002). The house at 203 Lambeth Road was of his own design (although the current structure is the result of extensive modifications after its sale in 2010). His original design for an octagonal residence was rejected by the Guilford Association.

== In popular culture ==
Guilford has been featured in books and movies.

In Laura Lippman's 1998 debut novel Baltimore Blues, Guilford is the home of a prominent lawyer and his socialite wife. The protagonist amateur detective, Tess Monaghan, visits them while investigating a case. Guilford is described as bucolic, and full of mansions and old money.

Filmmaker, John Waters, famously lived and filmed in Guilford at 3900 Greenmount Avenue. He lived there in 1972 with his friend and collaborator, Mink Stole. His film Pink Flamingos was shot in part at the house, which served as Connie and Raymond Marble's home. The house and the "3900" yard sign (which Mink Stole purloined as a souvenir for Waters) were featured in the recent "John Waters: Pope of Trash" exhibit at the Academy Museum of Motion Pictures in Los Angeles.

== See also ==
- List of Baltimore neighborhoods
