= Northern High School (Baltimore) =

Public secondary school in Baltimore, Maryland, United States

Coordinates: 39°21′58″N 76°34′17″W

Northern High School was a high school in the Baltimore City Public Schools system.

The school mascot was the Viking. The school yearbook was the Valhalla. The address was 2201 Pinewood Ave; Baltimore, MD 21214. The school colors were green and white, but some graduating year's also had their own mascot and colors. The school initially was to have 7 - 12th grades with a combined Junior and Senior High in the same building. It opened in September 1965 with 7th and 10th grades. Due to foreseen overcrowding September 1966 classes were 8th, 10th and 11th grades. September 1967 classes were for 9th, 10th, 11th and 12th grades. The first graduating class was June 1968. In September 1968 classes started with 10th 11th and 12th grades. In the 1960s the school was mostly college prep with a high percentage of students going on to college. There were also work study programs associated with the school.

To promote further integration among Black and White students, some Black and White students were bussed from other neighborhoods, helping to make it a more racially diverse school. The city of Baltimore had a policy of letting students pick their high school and many Blacks choose Northern High School. White students were given a limited choice. Students rode public buses for free, which helped if the chosen school was distant.

There were a number of sports teams: Football, basketball, baseball, soccer, swimming in a 4-lane pool (Division II undefeated in 1969), cross country running, track and field, volleyball, tennis, wrestling, gymnastics, softball and lacrosse. There were cheerleaders, a modern dance group, a jazz ensemble, chess club, and yearbook.

"Incognito" included student creative writing and students contributed to You're the Critic which featured critical reviews by Baltimore City High School students. There was also a student government.

A number of classes were available to students, such as: English, Geometry, Algebra, Trigonometry, Calculus, Social Studies, Biology, Art, Drama, Photography, Reading, French, Spanish, German, Typing, Sociology, Psychology, Drafting, and others. Some community college classes were offered after regular school hours on the Northern High School campus.

The class of 1969 had over 1,000 graduating students and was the largest graduating class on record at that time. For the class of 1977, the city comptroller, Hyman Pressman, read a poem for graduation.

Due to overcrowding in the 1970s in many Baltimore City Schools. There were at least 4 or more years starting in the late 60's at Northern High School when students attended on shifts all year, with juniors and seniors attending 8 A.M. to 2 P.M. with sophomores and lower grades initially attending 10 A.M. to 4 P.M. Lunch times were staggered from 10 A.M. to 2 P.M allowing the school to have sufficient class rooms for teaching. Starting in September 1968 Northern High School was a 3 year school. Many students transferred to Northern High School after Junior High School of grades 7, 8, and 9. During these times freshman who wanted to attend Northern could not and had to wait until their sophomore year due to the over crowding. Once enrollment went down below 2600 students, some extra classrooms were added in pods or trailers, during the summer of 1977, and the school was again full-time. Many students from the morning session went on directly into the workforce and many in the afternoon session went directly to college.

In 1997 the administration issued a wave of mass suspensions to members of the student body to try to curb discipline issues.

In 2002 the school system discontinued Northern High School and put Reginald F. Lewis High School and W.E.B. DuBois High School in the former Northern building.
