= Pen Lucy, Baltimore =

Coordinates: 39.337°N 76.6077°W

Pen Lucy
- Neighborhood of Baltimore
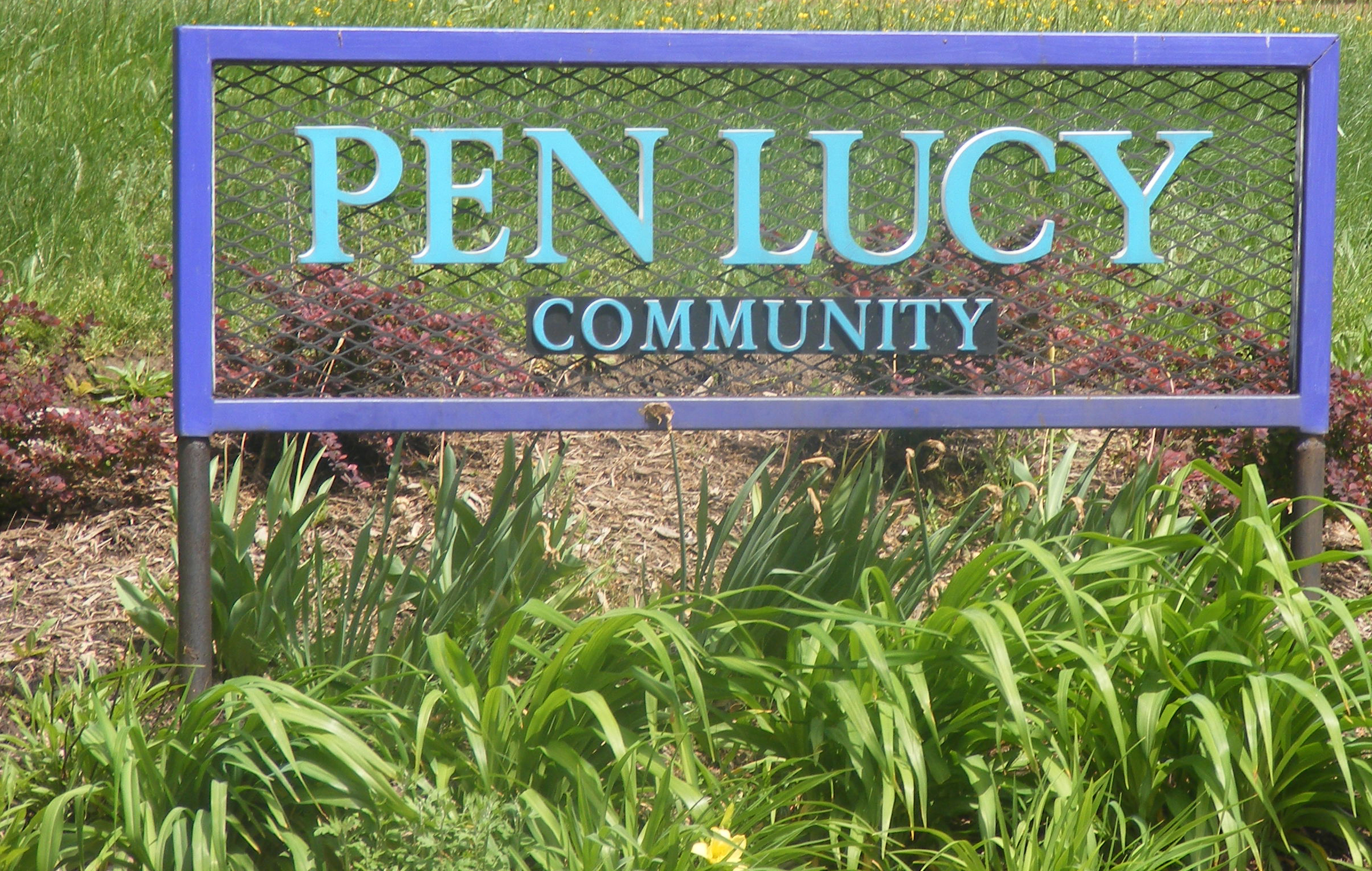
- Pen Lucy neighborhood welcome sign

- Location within Baltimore
- Country: United States
- State: Maryland
- City: Baltimore
- Time zone: UTC-5 (Eastern)
  - Summer (DST): EDT
- ZIP code: 21218
- Area code: 410, 443, and 667

Pen Lucy is a small community in the North District of Baltimore and part of the development of York Road, a historic Baltimore route to Pennsylvania. The Pen Lucy neighborhood features many different housing types.

== Location ==
Pen Lucy is bounded by Argonne Drive (south), East 43rd Street (north), Greenmount Avenue (west) and The Alameda (east). To the south of Pen Lucy are the neighborhoods of Waverly and Ednor Gardens-Lakeside. To the east is the Northwood neighborhood. Across Greenmount Avenue, the western boundary of Pen Lucy is the Guilford neighborhood. The Wilson Park neighborhood borders Pen Lucy to the north.

The Pen Lucy Neighborhood Association, Inc., a non profit community organization represents the residents of the Pen Lucy Community.

== Demographics ==
As in the 2006 Baltimore City, Pen Lucy Neighborhood Action Plan, https://planning.baltimorecity.gov/sites/default/files/PenLucyAreaMasterPlan.pdf

There are several churches and organizations within Pen Lucy and just outside of the area that have both a vested interest and play an active role in the revitalization and health of the neighborhood. Since 1911 Blessed Sacrament Church has been a constant presence, serving the Catholic population and community members at Old York Road and 42nd Street. With the moving on of Boundary Methodist on 42nd Street in the 1980s, Faith Christian congregation took ownership of their buildings. The presence of established churches has helped to stabilize the neighborhood by helping to fight the drugs in the neighborhood and provide constructive activities for the youth in the area. For example, the Antioch Youth Senate of Govans, a program of the Antioch Church of God, Inc., operates youthprograms that provide employment and opportunities for community service hours for children. In addition to the faith based institutions, the neighborhood civic associations are helping residents of Pen Lucy to have a better quality of life.

According to the 2000 US Census, 3,260 people live in Pen Lucy with 90.3% African-American and 5.8% White. The median household income is $22,356. 87.9% of the houses are occupied and 37.8% of those are occupied by the home's owner. Fifty-five percent of Pen Lucy's 1,500 households are headed by single females. Seventy-five percent of these households include children under the age of 18. More than 27 percent of the entire population is age 18 or younger, with approximately 900 children living in the neighborhood.

== Schools ==
Guilford Elementary Middle School is the zoned public school for Pen Lucy. High school students generally attend the high schools Mervo, W. E. B. Dubois High School|DuBois, or Baltimore City College and many Charter schools across the city.

== Notable people ==
Notable residents of Pen Lucy include:

- Tupac Shakur (1971-1996), rapper, actor and poet.

== Notes ==
The Pen Lucy Neighborhood Association, Inc. (PLNA, Inc.) is the organization that serves the residents of Pen Lucy, by coordinating the long term planning for the improvement of the neighborhood.

== See also ==
List of Baltimore neighborhoods
