= Maria Briscoe Croker =

American poet

- Born: Maria Briscoe; April 24, 1875; Charlotte Hall, Maryland
- Died: May 6, 1962 (aged 87); Baltimore, Maryland
- Education: Maryland State Normal School, now Towson University
- Occupation: Poet
- Spouse: John Briscoe
- Writing career
- Notable work: On Catoctin
- Notable awards: Maryland poet laureate, 1959

Maria Briscoe Croker (April 24, 1875 – May 6, 1962) was an American poet and Maryland's first Poet laureate.

Croker was born at Charlotte Hall, Maryland in St. Mary's County. She attended St. Mary's Seminary (now St. Mary's College of Maryland), then Maryland State Normal School (now Towson University).

In 1895 she married Edward Joseph Croker at Charlotte Hall Academy where her father Edward Briscoe taught literature. After living out of state for a decade, Croker and her husband moved to Baltimore where she was a member of several artistic and civic groups, and an enthusiastic fan of the Orioles. They family lived in the Guilford neighborhood at 3803 Juniper Road.

Crocker's poetry was a product of her deep roots in Maryland. One of Croker's ancestors, John Briscoe, came to Maryland with the settlers on the Ark and the Dove. She published three volumes of poetry and her poems are in roughly 50 anthologies.

In 1959, Governor J. Millard Tawes appointed Croker to be the first Poet laureate of Maryland. She was 84 at the time and died three years into her tenure.
