= Cedarcroft, Baltimore =

- Cedarcroft Historic District
- U.S. National Register of Historic Places
- U.S. Historic district
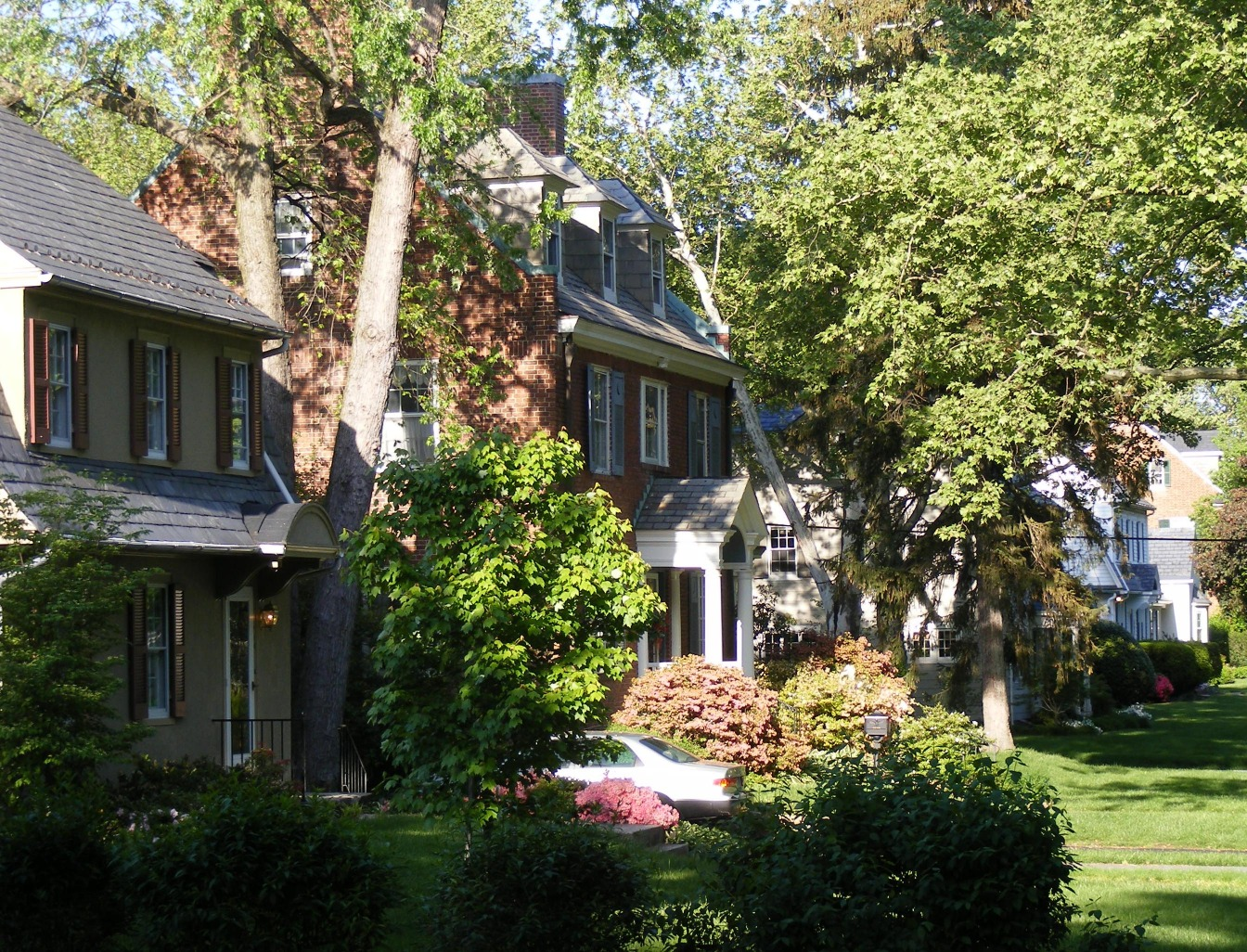
- Homes in Cedarcroft

- Location within Baltimore Location within Maryland Location within the United States
- Location: Bounded by Gittings Ave., York Rd., E. Lake Ave. and Bellona Ave., Baltimore, Maryland
- Coordinates: 39°22′17″N 76°36′52″W
- Area: 40 acres (16 ha)
- Architect: Palmer, Edward L. Jr., et al.
- Architectural style: Late Victorian, Late 19th And 20th Century Revivals
- NRHP reference No.: 03001332
- Added to NRHP: December 24, 2003

Cedarcroft is a distinctive residential neighborhood in the North district of Baltimore, bordered by Gittings, East Lake and Bellona Avenue avenues and York Road. According to Baltimore City's Commission for Historical and Architectural Preservation (CHAP), the houses in Cedarcroft are in the Dutch Colonial Revival, Federal Revival, Tudor Revival, Georgian Revival, Cape Cod Revival, Bungalow, and Italianate styles of architecture.

== History ==
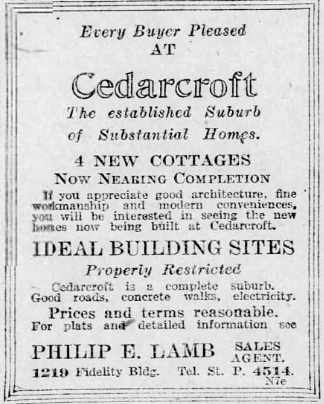
An October 23, 1919 advertisement in the Baltimore Sun for "Properly Restricted" houses.

Most of the homes in Cedarcroft were built between 1910 and 1939 by the Cedarcroft Land Company.

In 1885, Philip E. Lamb purchased 25 acres (100,000 m^{2}) fronting York Road north of the rural village of Govanstown. On the property was a house that had been built in 1846. A few years later, he bought an additional 20 acres (81,000 m^{2}). He called his estate Cedarcroft, and in 1886 built a substantial addition to the 1846 house which still stands at 6204 Sycamore Road.

The Cedarcroft Land Company was formed about 1910 by Philip and George Lamb, along with George Van Hollen, William McGeen and C.L. Applegarth. Later they were joined by Frank A. Warner, Jr., and Edward L. Palmer, the architect credited with the design of the development, which was between York and Bellona, Lake and Gittings.

Episcopalians living nearby met in makeshift quarters and were anxious to build a church. In 1911, the diocese bought land on the southwest corner of Cedarcroft and York roads for $5,000. The church was dedicated in 1913. Ten years later, it was moved a few hundred feet, from the center of the lot, on soaped beams so that a parish house could be added.

After the lots had been sold, the Cedarcroft Land Company was liquidated in the early 1920s, and its successor, the Cedarcroft Maintenance Corporation was chartered and the Cedarcroft Improvement Association formed. All of the covenants, restrictions and regulations made by the Land Company were incorporated in the Maintenance Corporation, the latter remaining the governing body of Cedarcroft. All restrictions and requirements set by the Land Company were preserved.

The records of the corporation and improvement association are maintained in a loose leaf binder entitled, "Beginning 1926", although, the records date from 1929. The 1929 treasurer's report shows payments of $13 for cutting grass on vacant lots and $112.50 for top soil, hauling leaves and operating the snow plow. These traditional codes governed the construction of single-family houses cost not less than $6000; most of the homes sold between 2012 and 2018 between $300,000 and $850,000 price range. They are all built according to the neighborhood plan and color scheme regulations. In 2016 the final unbuilt lot was built upon.

By 1921 thirty houses had been constructed on the association lots. Corner lots sold for $2000 and interior block lots sold for $1800. The rapid surge of immigrants and Baltimore residents moving north initiated the creation of Cedarcroft's Maintenance Corporation and Improvement Association.

Cedarcroft Maintenance Corporation's covenants remain in place; however, they are subject to homeowner's approval and vote periodically to renew and approve changes. Plans, color schemes and renovations are submitted to the group for approval. Due to the larger size and higher values of Cedarcroft houses, the neighborhood saw a sizable number of young family groups moving in. Prior to the passage of the Fair Housing Act of 1968, racially restrictive covenants were used in Cedarcroft. A 1919 advertisement in the Baltimore Sun described houses sold by Philip E. Lamb as "Properly Restricted" and located at "ideal building sites".

In 2015, 10 units within Cedarcroft were sold; the average price of these sales was $427,830, the median being $439,750. Aside from renovations to the houses of the neighborhood and the growth of trees and landscaping, Cedarcroft looks much as it did in the mid-1900s. The distinguishing features of the area are its traditional Revival style houses, and narrow streets lined with arched trees, "reminiscent of medieval arches." In 2012, Cedarcroft is a diverse community, attracting traditional and non-traditional families from a variety of backgrounds. While the historical character remains intact through neighborhood efforts, Cedarcroft exists and thrives without constrictive and intrusive rules. Owners wishing to renovate are encouraged to have neighbor buy-in of plans before they are presented to the Cedarcroft Improvement Corporation. This process allows for individuality, yet builds cooperation between neighbors. In 2016, the first new house in the neighborhood since 1953 was added on the final unbuilt lot.

Located in City Council District Four, Cedarcroft has been listed as a historic district on the National Register of Historic Places.

According to the 2000 Demographic profile, 97.8% of the houses in Cedarcroft are occupied, more than 91% by owners. 75.6% of the houses are family households.

In the 1990s, Cedarcroft retained qualities of the calm and beautiful neighborhood envisioned by the Lamb's despite its increasingly urban surrounding, with a reporter noting that the community comes together, celebrating October block parties, Halloween parades, and Christmas decoration contests.

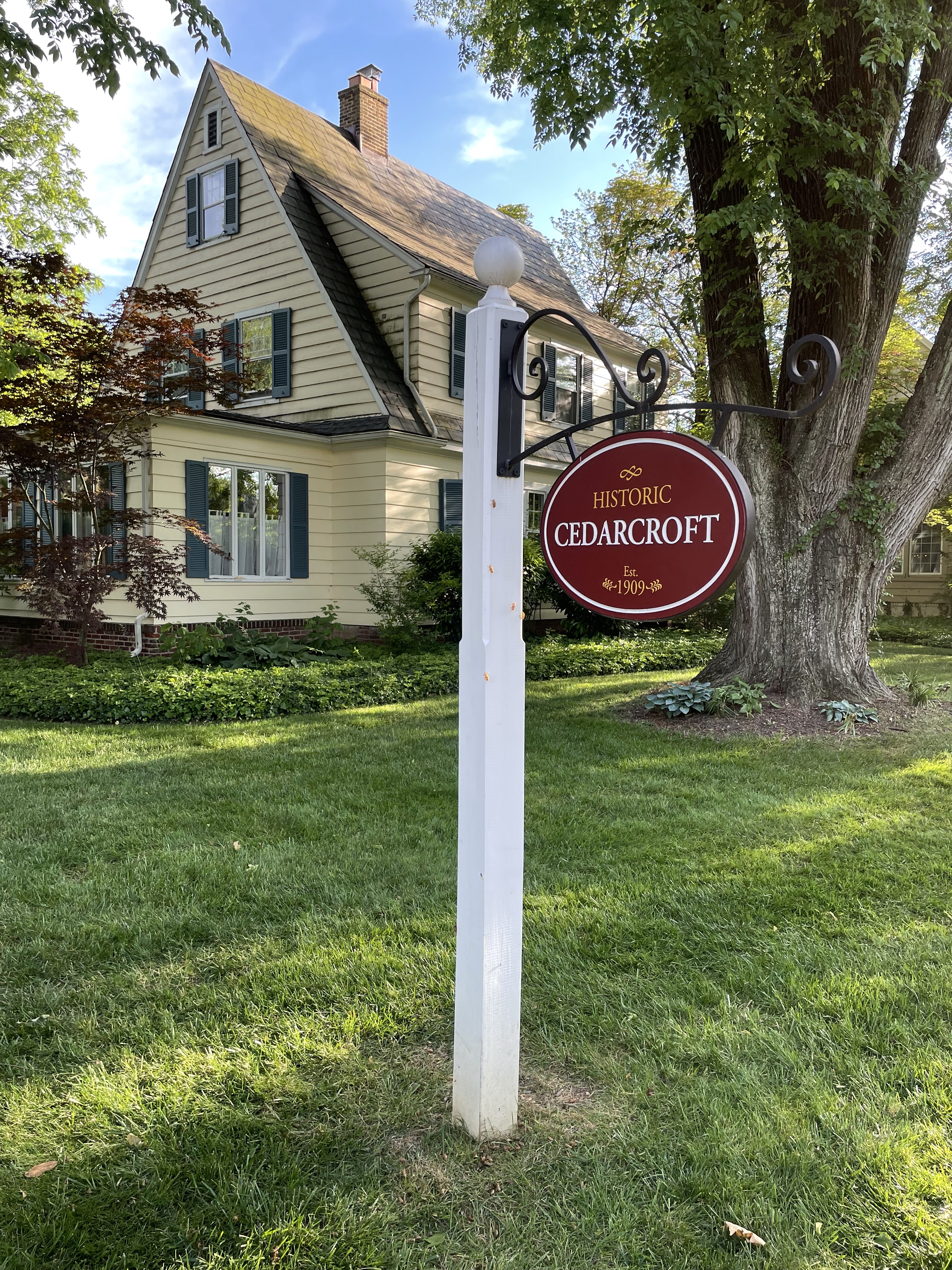
Cedarcroft Baltimore Neighborhood Sign 01

== Demographics ==
According to the last census, 91.5% of the residents are white, 5.1% are black, 1.7% Asian and 2.5% are Hispanic. 21.9% of the white residents are reported as of Irish ancestry, another 16.7% English, 34.2% German and 14.9% Italian. The median family income is $99,389 with 0% of those in the workforce unemployed. 100% of the residents are high school graduates and 34.1% report having a graduate or professional degree.

== Government representation ==
Community	State District	Congressional District	City Council District
Cedarcroft	43rd	2nd	4th
Representatives	Washington, Embry, Boyce	Johnny Olszewski	Mark Conway

== Buildings of interest ==
Nativity Episcopalian Church

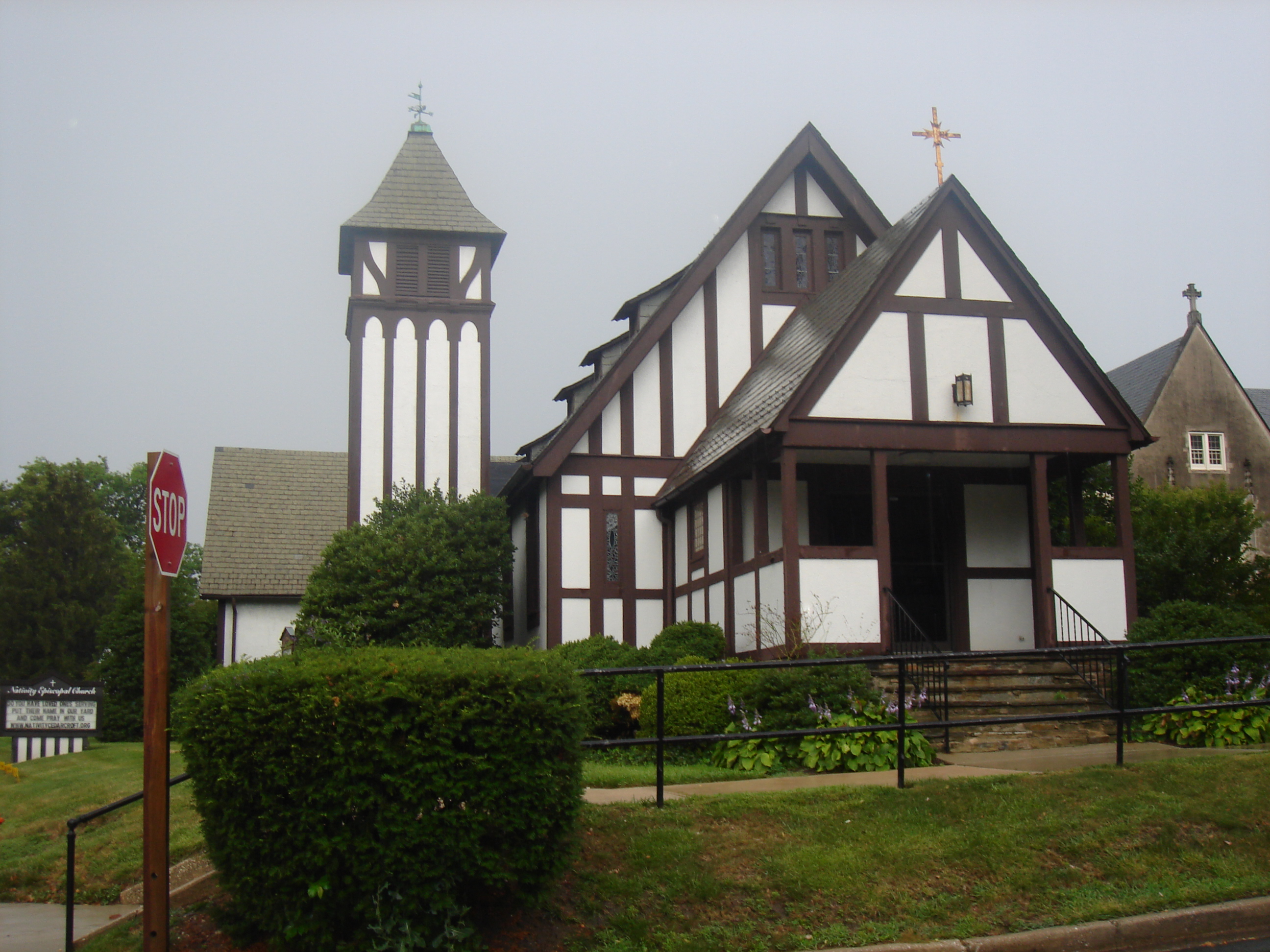
Church of Nativity

During the early years of the Cedarcroft development, the new community did not have a church. In 1910, Reverend Charles Hensel began a new mission by holding services in the newly constructed houses in the community. The structure of what is now known as the Church of the Nativity was originally built in Garrett County, Maryland. In 1913, the Tudor Revival style edifice was dismantled and transported to what is now 419 Cedarcroft Road. The first official church service was held on Christmas of the same year. The construction of the Parish House in 1923 required the entire church structure to be moved 100 ft (30 m) toward the York Road extremity of the property.

In 1947, the Cedarcroft School was established within the church as a preschool and kindergarten. As the population in the community of Cedarcroft grew in the 1950s, structural additions were made to the church including a passageway to the Parish House, now used by the Cedarcroft School.

Cedarcroft School

Cedarcroft School ca. 1923

Edith Gentry, a graduate of the nearby College of Notre Dame, established the Cedarcroft School in 1947. Using the west wing of the Church of Nativity in Cedarcroft as their venue, teachers place exceptional emphasis on proper manners and the "philosophy that every child learns differently". The establishment is coed, nonsectarian, and is the school to many young children of the Cedarcroft community and surrounding neighborhoods.

The Lamb Estate

6204 Sycamore Road is the site of the original house built by Philip Lamb in 1886. The mansion was the first constructed on Lamb's 45-acre (180,000 m^{2}) estate, which is now the Cedarcroft neighborhood. The house is symmetrical, featuring a cross-gable roof, sash windows with shutters, a porch elevated by Doric columns, and a simple bracketed cornice. This Eastlake style, closely associated with the Victorian Revival, was very prominent in the 1880s.

== Architectural styles ==
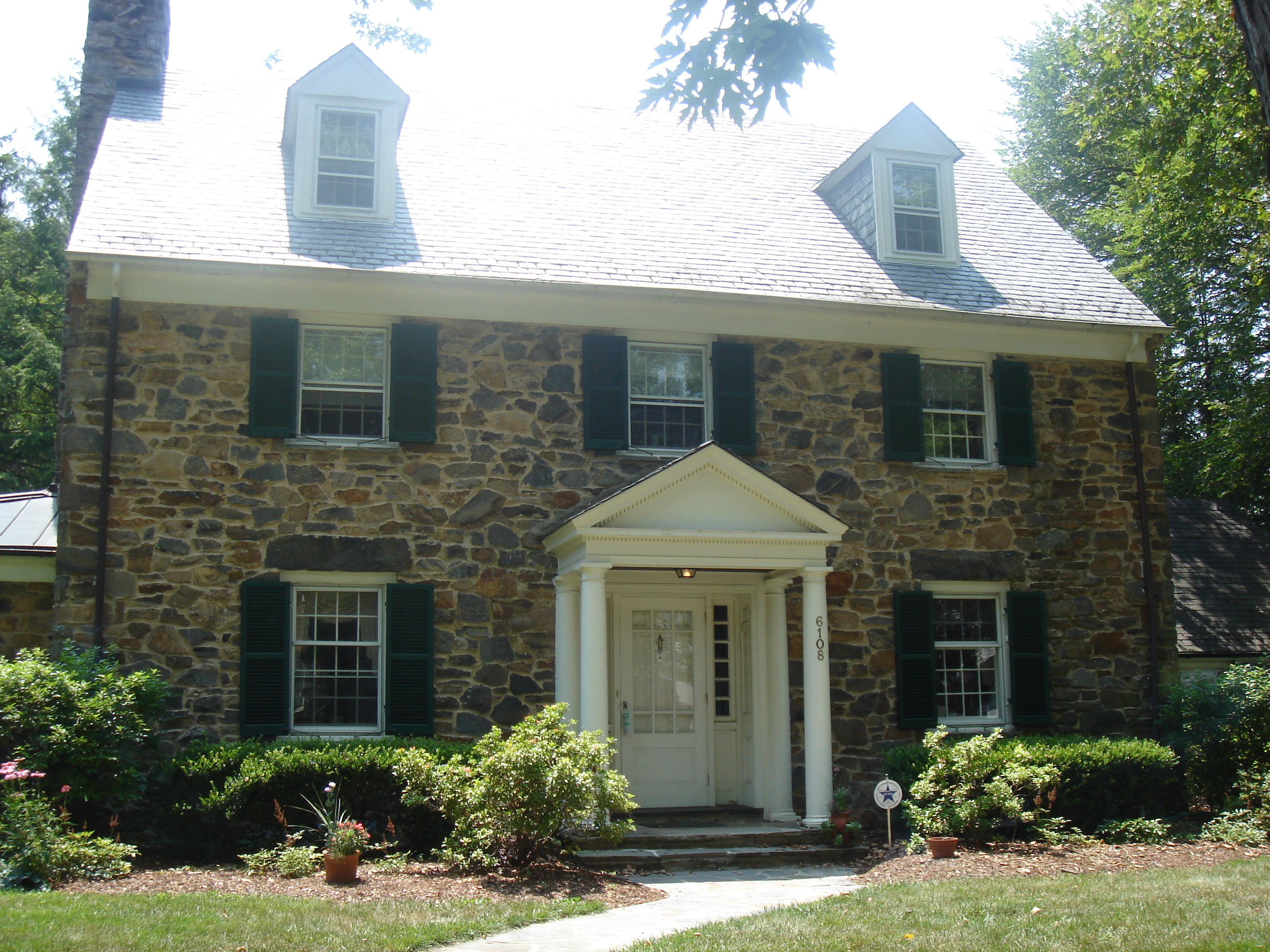
Georgian Revival

Dutch Colonial Revival

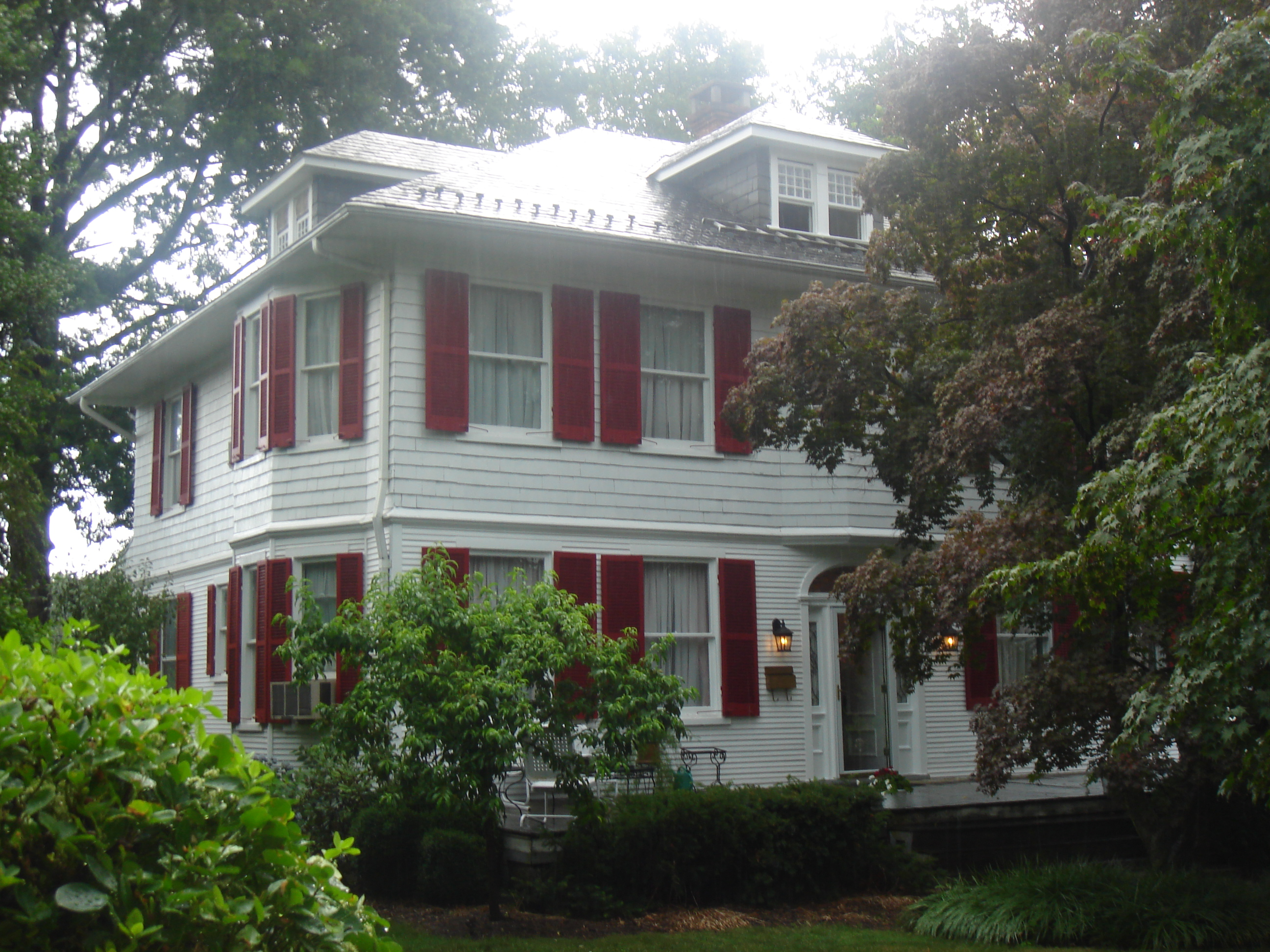
American Four-Square

Bungaloid

Tudor Revival

Cedarcroft's architectural styles are varied, and include Federal Revival, Dutch Colonial Revival, Tudor Revival, Gothic Revival, Cape Cod Revival, Colonial Revival, English Cottage, Split-Level, and Ranch variants. Federal Revival is the style most prevalent; however, the degree in which any particular house is an homage to any "high style" elements was a matter for the architect and client to decide. Many houses incorporate attributes that can "bleed" between more highly defined styles. The houses pictured in this gallery are a sampling of the type of homes in the area.

Georgian Revival houses of the early 1900s-The symmetrical sash windows, the tall chimneys, and triangular pediments, held above the front entrances by Doric columns, distinguish the Georgian style. Also, the simple cornices and dormer windows built into the gable roofs distinguish these houses as Georgian Revival.

Dutch Colonial Revival style of the early 1900s is also prominent. The pictured house features a shingled gambrel roof with 6 by 6 paneled sash windows. On the first floor is a pediment entryway and 8 by 8 paneled sash windows, surrounded with shutters.

American Four-Square style is also present in Cedarcroft. The house is essentially a cube with a pyramidal roof set on top. On each side of the pyramid is a centered dormer window for the attic of the house. Bay windows that extend through both stories of the house are another common feature of the American Four-Square style, which was most common between 1910 and 1930.

Bungaloid-The term Bungalow applies strictly to one-story cottage style houses with front porches dominating the street facade. The Bungaloid is cousin of the bungalow, and the term is applied to houses of "one and a half" to two-story dwellings popular from the early 1900s through the 1940s. In this example, a steep gable roof includes a large multi-sash window triangular dormer. The shallower gable covers an open porch that is held up by Doric columns. Also, the entire structure is supported by a large stone foundation that is exposed as part of the architecture. These houses often are noted for their fumed interior oak woodwork, built-in cabinets and other factors popularized by Gustave Stickley who championed the American Arts and Crafts movement.

Lastly, houses of the Tudor Revival style, such as the building above on the right, are found across Cedarcroft. Houses such as these contained elements from a variety of styles popular throughout the 1920s and 30s. In this stucco-exterior finished sample the slate roof, and half-round hood over the front door, are an homage to cottages found in Great Britain.

== Notable residents ==
Chris Van Hollen - U.S. Senator

== See also ==
- List of Baltimore neighborhoods
