= Wilson Park, Baltimore =

Neighborhood in Baltimore, United States

Coordinates: 39.347°N 76.602°W

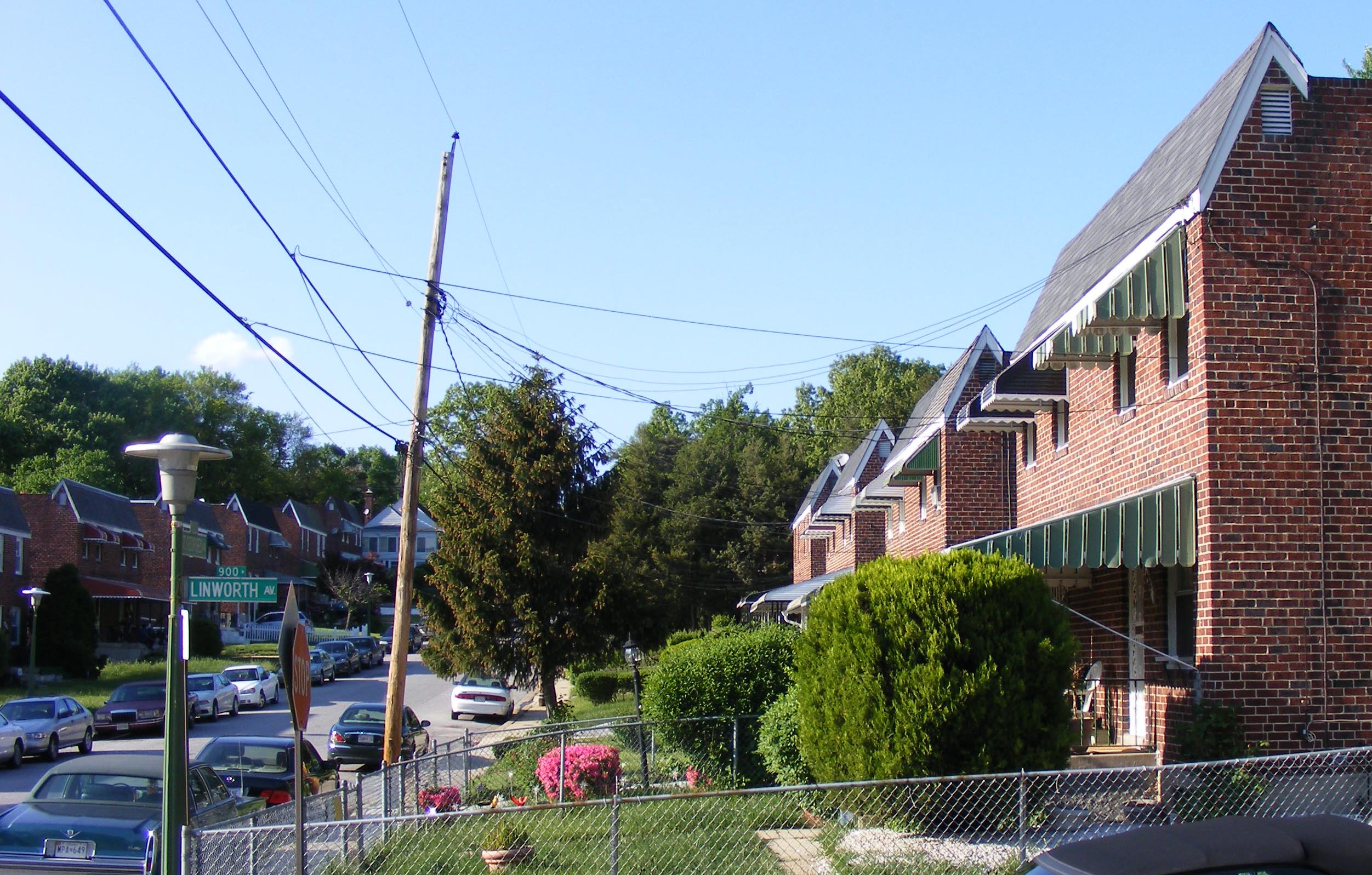
Row homes in Wilson Park

Wilson Park is a small community in northeast Baltimore, Maryland and one of the first African-American communities in the city. It is bounded on the south by 43rd Street and on the east by The Alameda. Two community associations serve the area: the Kimberleigh Road Community Association and the Wilson Park Improvement Association. The homes range from large single-family homes to semi-detached and townhouses. A majority of homes are owner-occupied.

== Demographics ==
According to the 2000 US Census, 1,355 people live in Wilson Park with 97.8% African-American and .7% White. The median family income is $45,208. 86% of the houses are occupied and 78.5% of those are occupied by the home's owner.

== Schools ==
Wilson Park has one public K-8 school: Guilford Elementary/Middle. There is one public elementary school: Walter P. Carter Elementary. The area is also served by Chinquapin Middle School. High school students generally attend nearby Mergenthaler Vocational Technical Senior High School, Baltimore City College or Lewis high schools.

== History ==
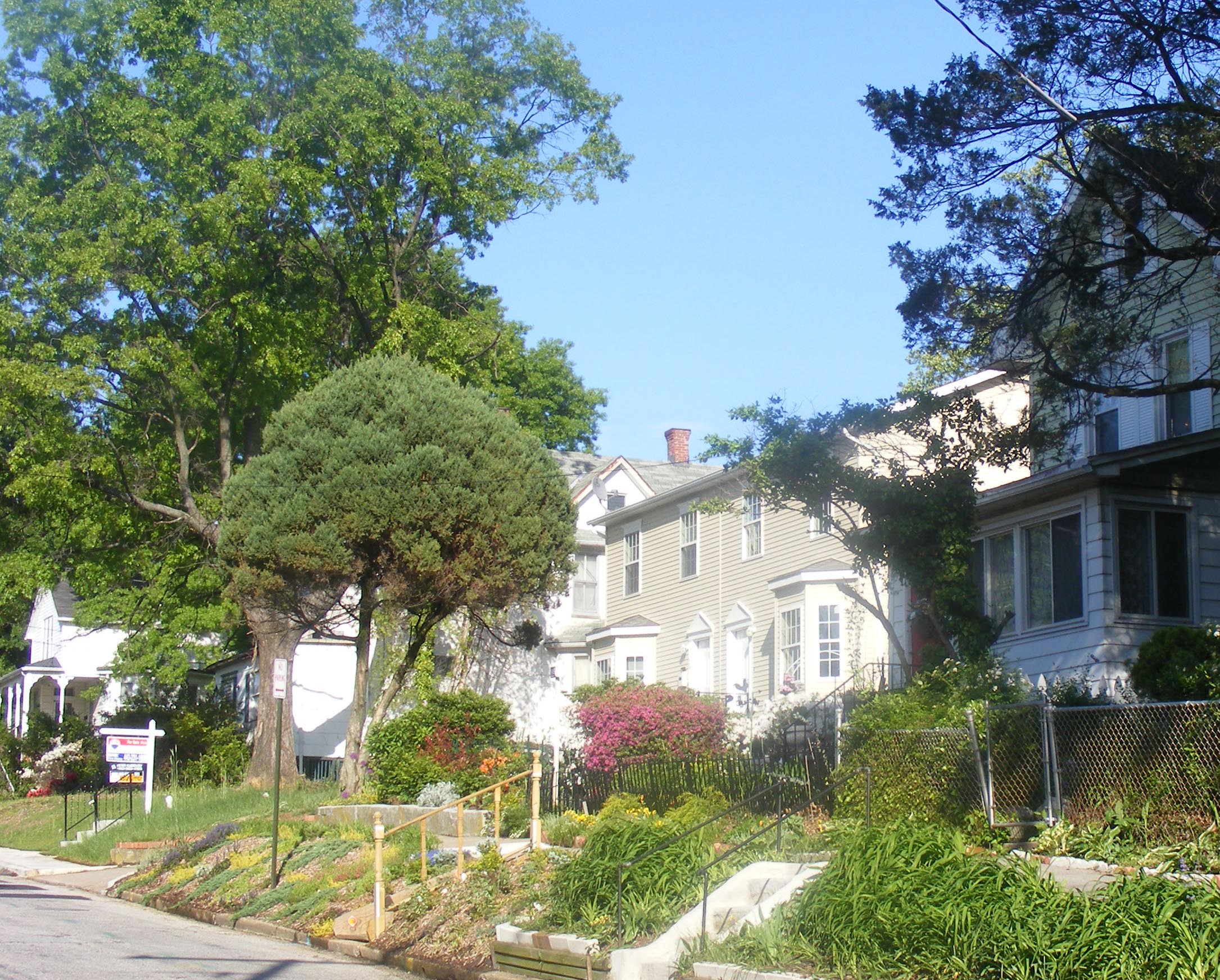
Single-family homes in Wilson Park

Wilson Park was built north of Baltimore which expanded in the 1950s to include Wilson Park and beyond. Still it is the first community, now in Baltimore, built solely for black people. It was developed by Harry Wilson, an African American who began building houses as early as 1917. In addition to some of the neighborhoods being culturally historic, several are architecturally significant.

Wilson's family began to sell large tracts of land in the early 1950s to developers who built dozens of new homes and apartment buildings on Arlington Ave (now 43rd street), St. Georges Ave. and Coldspring Lane. Kimberleigh Road was created in 1953 as part of the development. These homes were bought by a variety of upwardly mobile African-American families including those of steelworkers from the Sparrows Point Shipyard, postal workers, teachers and Morgan State College administrators.

== Government Representation ==
Community	State District	Congressional District	City Council District
Wilson Park	43rd	7th	4th
Representatives	Regina Boyce	Mfume	
