= Mid-Govans, Baltimore =

Coordinates: 39.358°N 76.61°W

Mid-Govans Govanstown
- Neighborhood of Baltimore
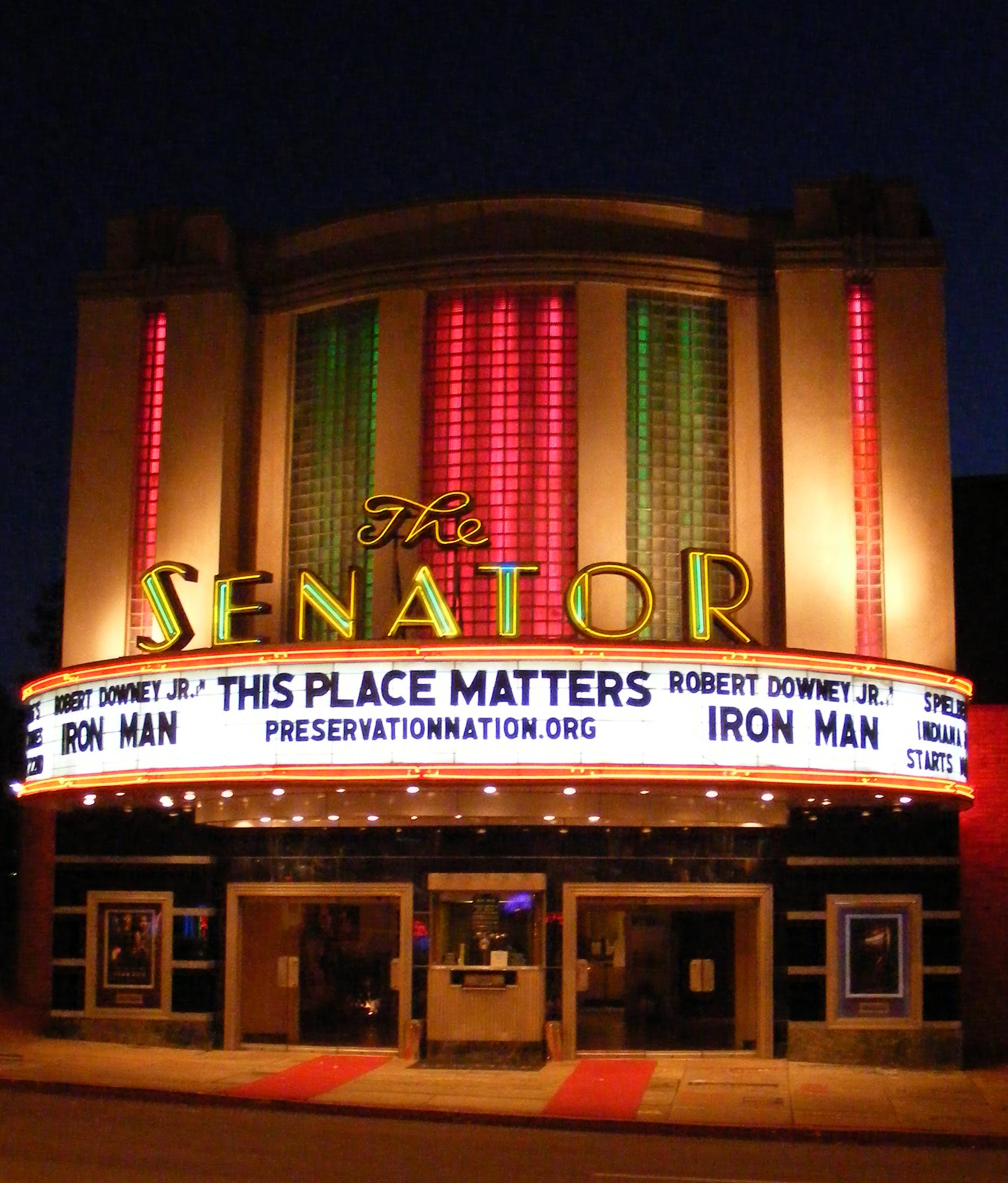
- Senator Theater on York Road

- Location within Baltimore
- Country: United States
- State: Maryland
- City: Baltimore
- Time zone: UTC-5 (Eastern)
  - Summer (DST): EDT
- ZIP code: 21212
- Area code: 410, 443, and 667

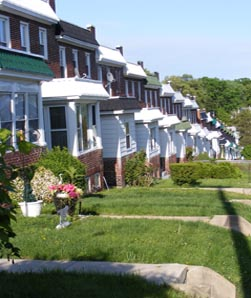
Homes in Govans, just off York Road

Mid-Govans is a community in northeast Baltimore, Maryland and part of the development of York Road, a historic Baltimore route to Pennsylvania. As the name suggests, Mid-Govans is located in the center of the larger neighborhood, Govans, with the rough boundaries of York Road to the west, Belvedere Avenue to the north, Midwood Avenue to the east, and Woodbourne Avenue to the south.

== Points of interest ==
Govans includes several historically and culturally significant places of interest including: DeWees Park, Chinquapin Park, the Senator Theater, Epiphany House, Gallagher Mansion, McCabe Mansion, Homeland and Belvedere Square Shopping Centers, City Garden plots on Woodbourne Avenue, Loyola University Maryland, College of Notre Dame of Maryland and the DeWees PAL Center.

== Demographics ==
According to the 2000 US Census, 2,375 people live in Mid-Govans with 80.4% African-American and 16.4% White. The median family income is $40,948. 93% of the houses are occupied and 75.7% of those are occupied by the home's owner.

== Schools ==
Mid-Govans has four public elementary schools: Govans, Yorkwood, Leith Walk, and Guilford elementary schools. The area is served by the Chinquapin Middle School. High school students generally attend in Mervo, City, DuBois, Poly, Western or Lewis highschools.

== See also ==
- List of Baltimore neighborhoods
