= Northwood, Baltimore =

- Northwood Historic District
- U.S. National Register of Historic Places
- U.S. Historic district
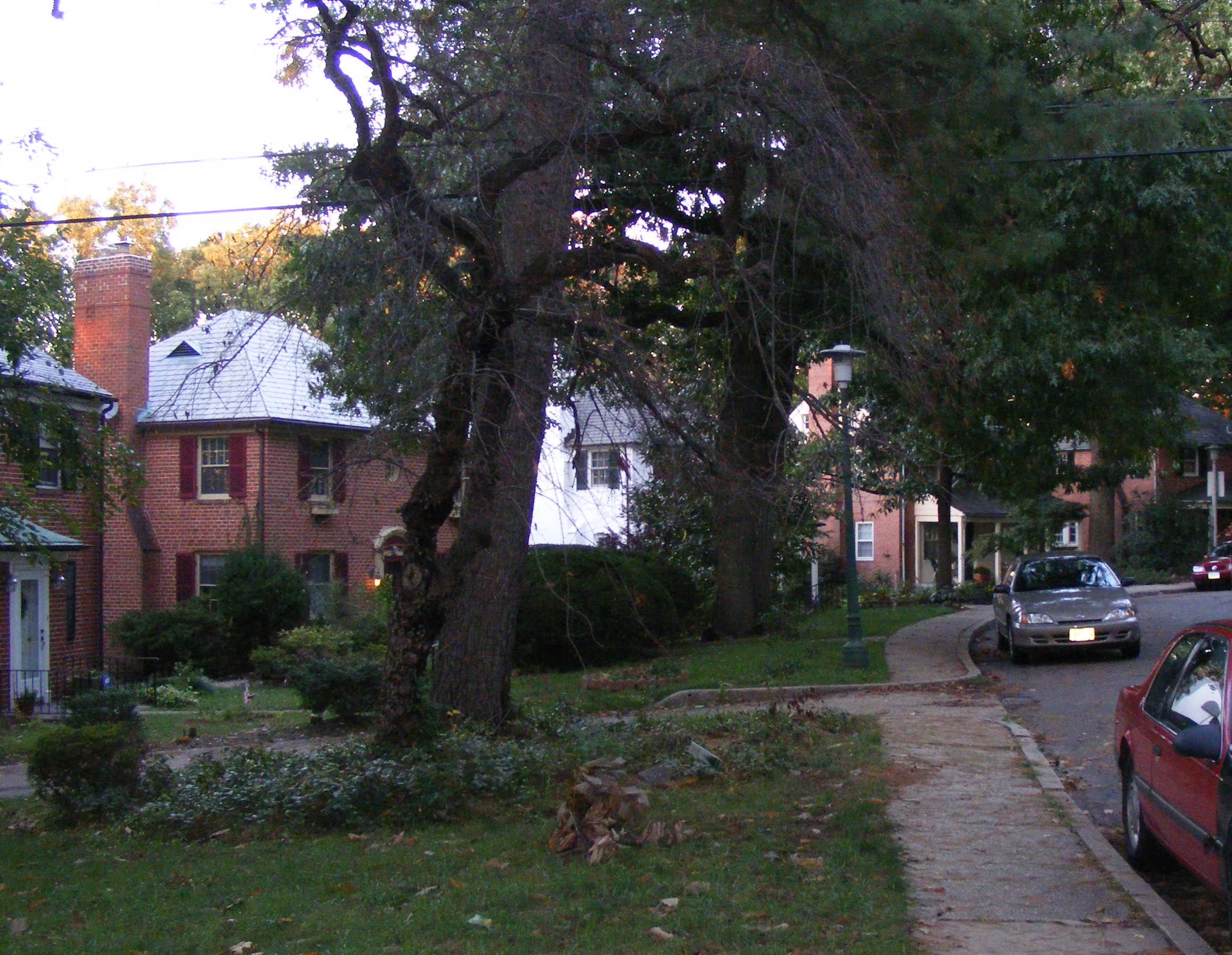
- Homes in Original Northwood

- Location within Baltimore Location within Maryland Location within the United States
- Location: Bounded on the East by Loch Raven Boulevard, U.S. Veterans Administration Rehabilitation & Extended Care Center on the South, The Alameda on the West & Cold Spring Lane on the North, Baltimore, Maryland
- Coordinates: 39°20′26″N 76°35′48″W
- Area: 125 acres (51 ha)
- Built: 1930
- Architect: Ahlers, John A.,; et al.
- Architectural style: Late 19th And 20th Century Revivals
- NRHP reference No.: 98000596
- Added to NRHP: June 15, 1998

Northwood is a neighborhood in the northeastern section of Baltimore, Maryland, in the United States. Northwood is served by the New Northwood and the Original Northwood community associations. The area is also home to the Northwood Shopping Center and the Northwood Baseball League. Morgan State University is located in this area.

The proposed Green Line Subway extension would include a station in this neighborhood, as well as a station at Morgan State University.

== New Northwood ==
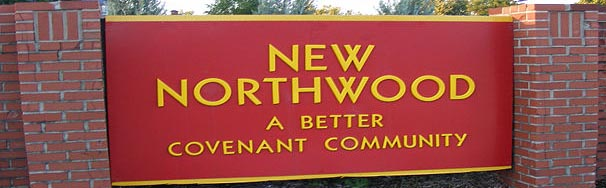

As the name implies, New Northwood is composed of newer homes, built in the mid-1950s. The houses are generally brick row house with trees and shrubs lining most blocks. New Northwood is served by the New Northwood Covenant Association.

=== Demographics ===
According to the 2000 US Census, 7,000 people live in New Northwood with 96.2% African-American and 2.4% White. The median household income is $31,105 and 94.1% of the houses are occupied.

== Original Northwood ==
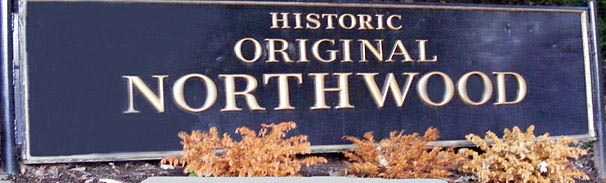

Original Northwood is composed of single family and townhouses ranging in price from $175,000 to $500,000. Development began in September 1930 with themes such as half-timbering and stucco, irregular massing, and the New England house form with jetty. Development began when The Roland Park Company purchased the estates of John W. Garrett, Enoch Pratt and Arunah Shepherdson Abell. By January 1, 1932, about 25 families had bought homes in Original Northwood. Today, Original Northwood comprises 369 homes and is one of the top 15 city neighborhoods in wealth. Original Northwood was designated an Historic District in 1998 and represents the largest unified collection of the architect, John A. Ahlers. Ahlers planning for the inclusion of the natural terrain in his design, with a canopy of oaks and elms, made Original Northwood among the first totally planned communities in the nation.

During the 1930s and 1940s, when the neighborhood was being built, racial covenants were used to exclude African-Americans from owning homes in the community. A typical covenant from Northwood reads: "At no time shall the land or any building erected be occupied by any negro or person of negro extraction."

Northwood Historic District was listed on the National Register of Historic Places in 1998.

=== Demographics ===
According to the 2000 US Census, 1,240 people live in Original Northwood with 56.5% African-American and 37.9% White. The median household income is $64,688 and 93.5% of the houses are occupied.

=== Notable residents ===
- Patricia Jessamy- State's Attorney, Baltimore City
- Robert W. Curran- member, Baltimore City Council
- Tom Marr - Baltimore radio broadcaster for WCBM and WFBR, and former play-by-play announcer for the Baltimore Orioles
- Tom Clancy- author

== Legislative districts ==
Community	State District	Congressional District	City Council District
Original Northwood	43rd	7th	3rd
New Northwood	43rd	7th	3rd
