= Woodbourne Heights, Baltimore =

Coordinates: 39.359°N 76.608°W

Woodbourne Heights Woodbourne-McCabe, Beauregard
- Neighborhood of Baltimore
- Location within Baltimore
- Country: United States
- State: Maryland
- City: Baltimore
- Time zone: UTC-5 (Eastern)
  - Summer (DST): EDT
- ZIP code: 21239
- Area code: 410, 443, and 667

Woodbourne Heights, Baltimore is a community in northern Baltimore, Maryland. It is served by the Woodbourne Heights Community, the Woodbourne-McCabe Neighborhood and the Beauregard Neighborhood Associations.

== Points of interest ==
Woodbourne Heights, Baltimore includes several historically and culturally significant places of interest including: Chinquapin Park, the McCabe Mansion, the Belvedere Square Shopping Centers and City Garden plots on Woodbourne Avenue.

== Demographics ==
According to the 2000 US Census, 2,880 people live in Woodbourne Heights/Woodbourne McCabe, Baltimore with 92% African-American and 5% White. The median family income is $40,948. 85% of the houses are occupied and about 50% of those are occupied by the home's owner.

== Schools ==
Woodbourne Heights, Baltimore has three public elementary schools: Yorkwood and Leithwalk elementary schools. The area is served by the Chinquapin Middle School. High school students generally attend Mervo, City, DuBois or Lewis high schools.
