= Elizabeth Embry =

American politician (born 1977)

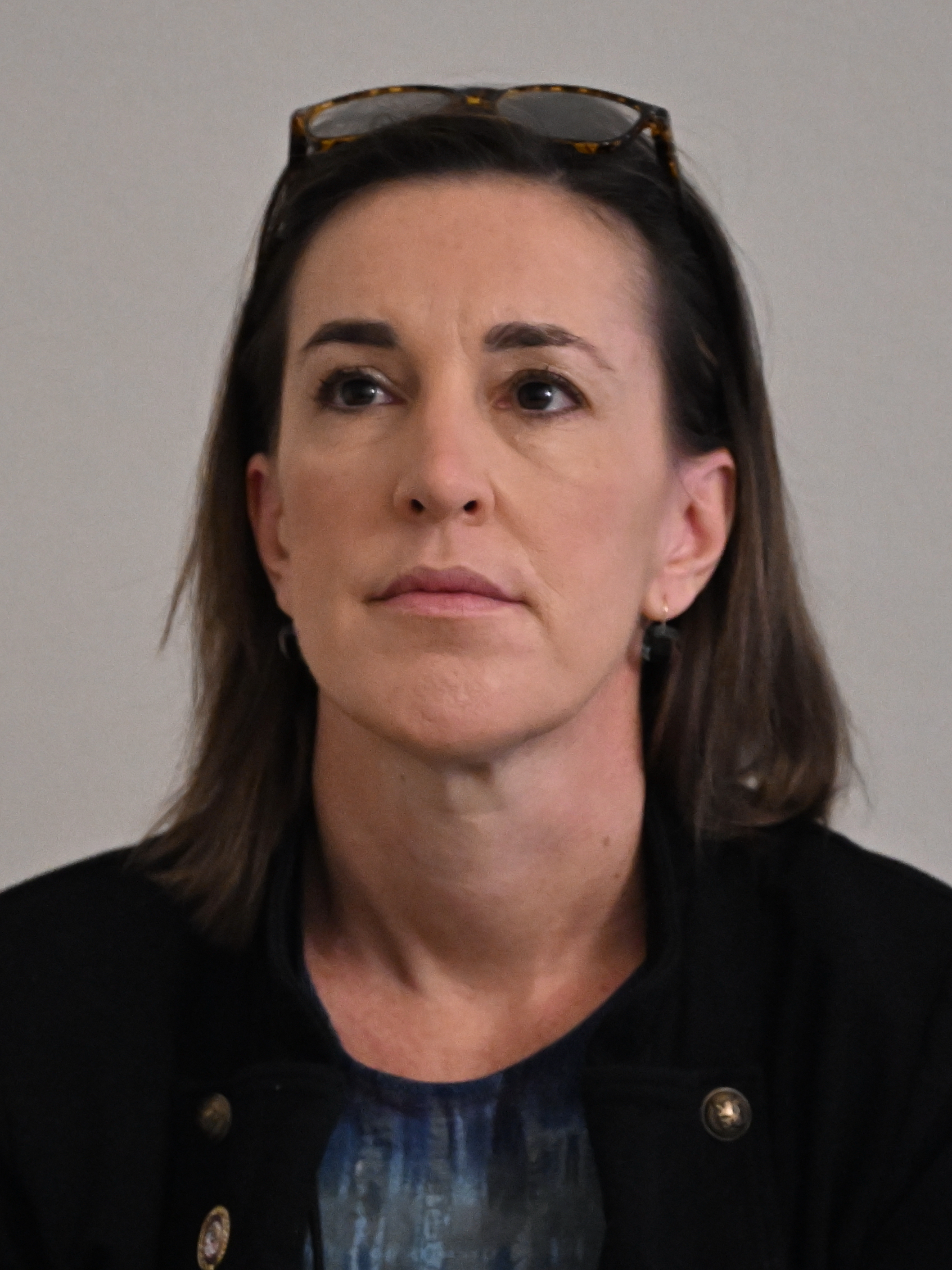
- Embry in 2025

Member of the Maryland House of Delegates from the 43A district
- Incumbent
- Assumed office January 11, 2023
- Preceded by: Maggie McIntosh

Personal details
- Born: March 2, 1977 (age 49) Baltimore, Maryland, U.S.
- Party: Democratic
- Education: Baltimore City College; Yale University; Columbia Law School
- Occupation: Attorney
- Website: Campaign website

Elizabeth M. Embry (born March 2, 1977) is an American politician who is a member of the Maryland House of Delegates for District 43A in Baltimore. In 2018, she was a candidate for Lieutenant Governor of Maryland, running on the ticket of Prince George's County executive Rushern Baker. In 2016, she was a candidate for mayor of Baltimore.

== Background ==
Embry was born to father Robert C. Embry Jr., the president of the Abell Foundation, and mother Mary Ann E. Mears, a sculptor and arts advocate. She attended Baltimore City College, Yale University, and Columbia Law School.

In 2011, Baltimore State's Attorney Gregg L. Bernstein named Embry as the new deputy prosecutor.

In January 2015, Embry became the chief of the Maryland Attorney General's criminal division. She was on leave from this job during her 2016 mayoral campaign, and resigned from it in February 2018 to focus on her gubernatorial campaign. In February 2019, Maryland Attorney General Brian Frosh rehired Embry to lead a probe of sex abuse in the Roman Catholic Archdiocese of Baltimore. In September 2018, Baltimore Archbishop William E. Lori confirmed the archdiocese was under investigation by the state and that it had given the attorney general more than 50,000 pages of internal documents dating back to 1965. On November 17, 2022, the Office of the Attorney General concluded its investigation, releasing a 456-page report identifying 600 victims of sexual abuse and accusing 158 Catholic priests, including 43 that were previously never publicly identified by the Archdiocese, of sexual abuse.

== 2016 Baltimore mayoral candidacy ==
Embry announced her candidacy for mayor of Baltimore on November 6, 2015, becoming the 11th candidate to join the race in the Democratic primary. Her platform included increasing funding for schools and extracurricular activities, criminal justice reform, and improving city transportation. During the primary, she was endorsed by former Maryland Attorney General Stephen H. Sachs.

Embry was defeated by state senator Catherine Pugh in the Democratic primary, placing third behind Pugh and former Baltimore mayor Sheila Dixon with 11.7 percent of the vote.

== 2018 Maryland lieutenant governor candidacy ==
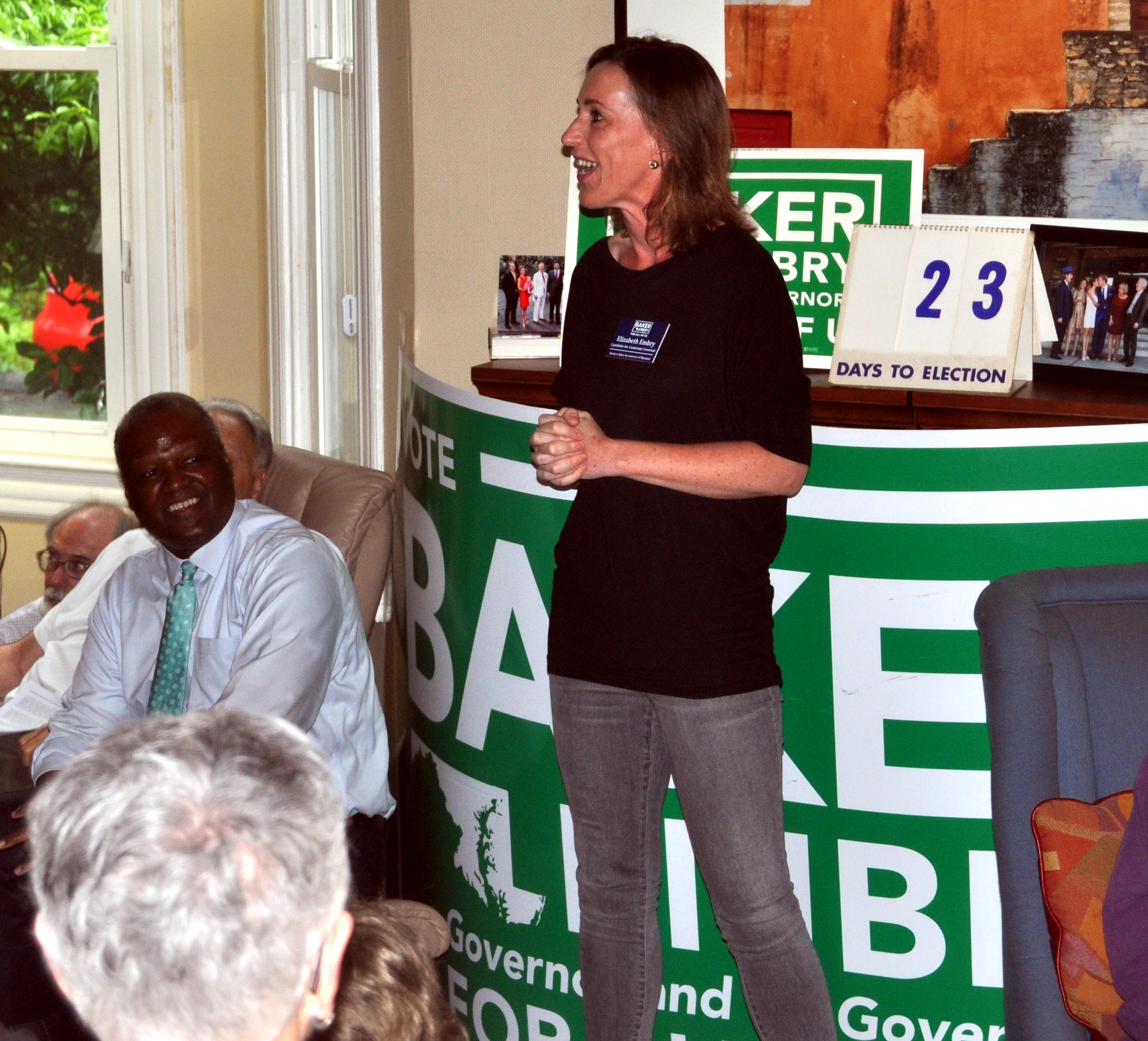
Embry (center) campaigning with Rushern Baker (left) in 2018

In January 2018, rumors arose that Embry was on Prince George's County executive Rushern Baker's shortlist for potential running mates. On February 20, 2018, Baker announced that Embry would be his running mate in the 2018 Maryland gubernatorial election. Embry said she was "a bit shocked" to be asked by Baker to join his ticket, as the two had only spoken briefly a few times before. However, Baker had said that he decided on Embry "[f]ive minutes into the conversation". Baker and Embry were defeated by former NAACP president Ben Jealous in the Democratic primary election, placing second with 29.3 percent of the vote.

== In the legislature ==
On January 21, 2022, Embry announced that she would run for the Maryland House of Delegates in District 43, seeking to succeed retiring state delegate Maggie McIntosh. During the primary, she was endorsed by state delegates Regina T. Boyce and Maggie McIntosh. Embry won the Democratic primary election on July 19, 2022, placing second behind Boyce with 29.1 percent of the vote, and later won the general election in November with 44.59 percent of the vote.

Embry was sworn into the Maryland House of Delegates on January 11, 2023. She is a member of the House Judiciary Committee.

== Political positions ==
=== Criminal justice reform ===
During her mayoral campaign, Embry released a plan to reform the Law Enforcement Officers' Bill of Rights, abolish cash bail, improve education services in the juvenile justice system, and providing automatic criminal record expungement where possible. She also supported providing incentives to encourage police officers to live in the city, and proposed implementing an early warning system to identify troubled officers.

=== Education ===
On April 2, 2016, Embry unveiled a plan to double the amount of funding the city provided to schools, extracurricular activities, and community schools. She also pledged to continue an executive order issued by Mayor Stephanie Rawlings-Blake that gave city employees paid time off to tutor struggling readers in Baltimore city schools. Embry did not support Pugh's plan to take back legal control of the city's schools, but pledged to "take an ownership role in the city's schools."

=== Housing ===
During her mayoral campaign, Embry said she would support reviving former Baltimore mayor William Donald Schaefer's "dollar house" program, in which the city sold homes for a dollar. She also said that her administration would use CitiStat to track maintenance and repairs at public housing complexes as well as the effectiveness of various housing incentives. On April 2, 2016, Embry appeared at a mayoral forum to discuss proposals for incentivizing affordable housing construction in Baltimore, where she said she would help neighborhoods come up with a revitalization plan and better use funds from the 21st Century School Building Plan to rebuild communities.

=== Immigration ===
In February 2026, Embry supported a bill that would allow the attorney general of Maryland to use data collected through police surveillance methods to identify and gather evidence against a judicial officer if someone brought a complaint of wrongful conduct against them and allow civil claims against anyone who violated another's constitutional rights under color of law.

=== Social issues ===
In March 2016, Embry proposed a social media campaign to promote local art by establishing a cabinet-level position to focus on the arts and artist residency programs at city schools. She added that her support for arts education was a matter of social justice, and that promoting youth arts programs would be her highest priority in arts policy. Embry called for a continuation of the city's 1 Percent for Public Art initiative, which saw a portion of development fees go toward city art projects.

=== Taxes ===
In March 2016, Embry said she supported continuing with tax cuts pursued by Mayor Stephanie Rawlings-Blake, but said that those tax cuts, which reduced property tax rates by 14 cents, were not enough. She also expressed the need to find new sources of revenue to cut the city's dependence on property and income taxes.

=== Transportation ===
On March 18, 2016, Embry released a plan for building a "comprehensive public transit system" in Baltimore, which included an east-west public transit line, expanded bus services, and connections between water taxis and other forms of transportation.

== Personal life ==
Embry lives in the Waverly neighborhood of Baltimore.

== Electoral history ==
2016 Baltimore mayoral Democratic primary results
Party	Candidate	Votes	%
Democratic	Catherine Pugh	48,665	36.6
Democratic	Sheila Dixon	46,219	34.7
Democratic	Elizabeth Embry	15,562	11.7
Democratic	David Warnock	10,835	8.1
Democratic	Carl Stokes	4,620	3.5
Democratic	DeRay Mckesson	3,445	2.6

Maryland gubernatorial Democratic primary, 2018
Party	Candidate	Votes	%
Democratic	Ben Jealous; Susan Turnbull	231,895	39.6
Democratic	Rushern Baker; Elizabeth Embry	171,697	29.3
Democratic	Jim Shea; Brandon Scott	48,647	8.3
Democratic	Krish O'Mara Vignarajah; Sharon Y. Blake	48,042	8.2
Democratic	Rich Madaleno; Luwanda Jenkins	34,184	5.8
Democratic	Valerie Ervin (withdrawn); Marisol Johnson (withdrawn)	18,851	3.2
Democratic	Alec Ross; Julie C. Verratti	13,780	2.4
Democratic	Ralph Jaffe; Freda Jaffe	9,405	1.6
Democratic	James Hugh Jones; Charles S. Waters	9,188	1.6

Maryland House of Delegates District 43A Democratic primary election, 2022
Party	Candidate	Votes	%
Democratic	Regina T. Boyce	8,090	30.9
Democratic	Elizabeth Embry	7,618	29.1
Democratic	Logan Endow	6,472	24.7
Democratic	Reginald Benbow	2,176	8.3
Democratic	Sherricka Alayshia McGrier-Douglas	1,005	3.8
Democratic	Rikki Vaughn	846	3.2

Maryland House of Delegates District 43A election, 2022
Party	Candidate	Votes	%
Democratic	Regina T. Boyce	19,788	47.52
Democratic	Elizabeth Embry	18,569	44.59
Green	Renaud Deaundre Brown	1,691	4.06
Republican	Gwendolyn O. Butler	1,509	3.62
Write-in		86	0.21
