= Tuscany-Canterbury, Baltimore =

- Tuscany-Canterbury Historic District
- U.S. National Register of Historic Places
- U.S. Historic district
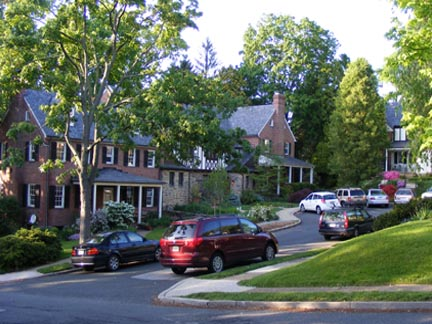
- Tuscany-Canterbury

- Location within Baltimore Location within Maryland Location within the United States
- Location: Roughly bounded by Charles St., University Pkwy., Stony Run, and Warrenton Rd., Baltimore, Maryland
- Coordinates: 39°20′16″N 76°37′18″W
- Area: 85 acres (34 ha)
- Architect: Morris, George R.; Ahlers, John A., et al.
- Architectural style: Late 19th And 20th Century Revivals, Tudor Revival, et al.
- NRHP reference No.: 01001182
- Added to NRHP: October 28, 2001

Tuscany-Canterbury is a historic neighborhood in northern Baltimore, Maryland, United States. Its history, development, and flavor are outlined in Eileen Higham's book Tuscany-Canterbury: A Baltimore Neighborhood History.

It was listed on the National Register of Historic Places in 2001.
