= W. E. B. Du Bois High School =

W. E. B. Du Bois High School of Environmental Science
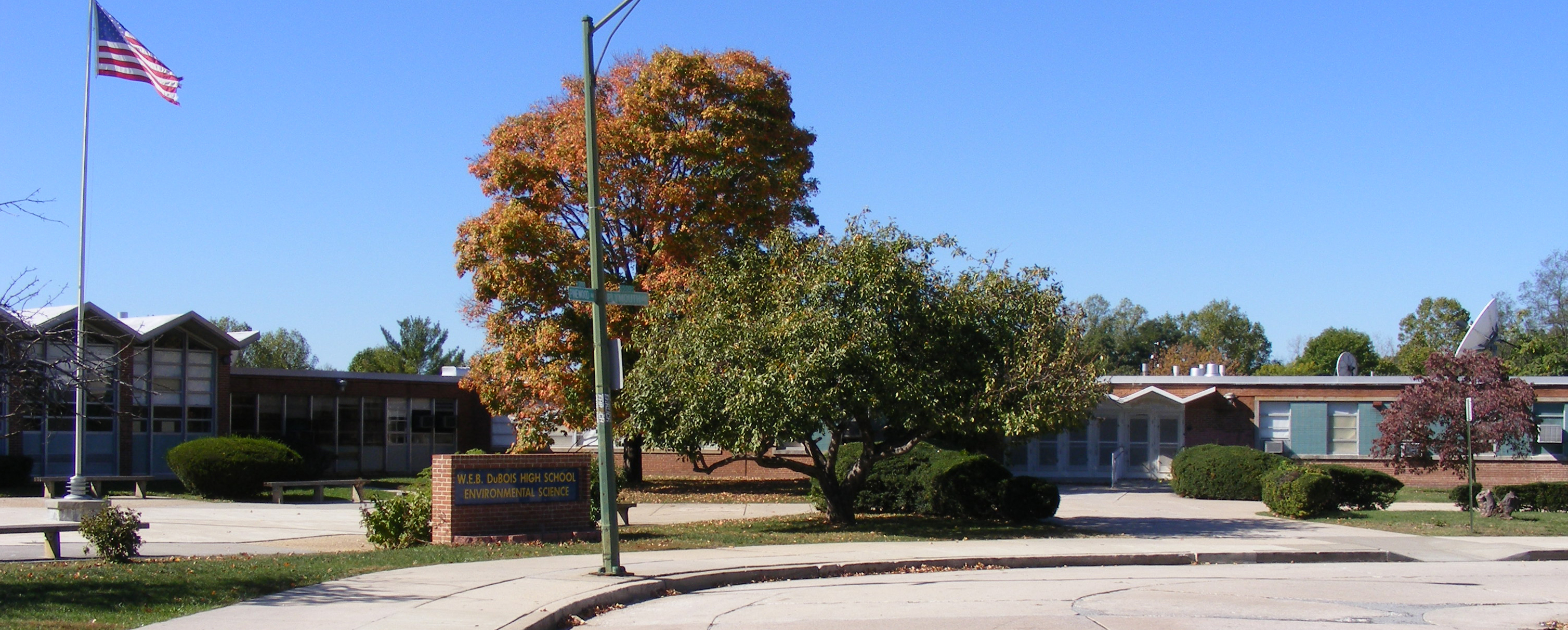

Location
- 2201 Pinewood Avenue; Baltimore, Maryland 21214; 39°21′56.4″N 76°34′11.3″W

Information
- School type: Public, Comprehensive
- Motto: "Every Student College Ready"
- Founded: 2002
- Closed: 2015
- School district: Baltimore City Public Schools
- Superintendent: Dr. Gregory Thornton [CEO]
- School number: 418
- Principal: Rudean Harris
- Grades: 9–12
- Enrollment: 330 (2014)
- Area: Urban
- Colors: Royal blue and Gold
- Mascot: Panther
- Team name: Panthers
- Website: www.baltimorecityschools.org/418

W. E. B. Du Bois High School of Environmental Science (officially referred to as W. E. B. Du Bois High School) was a public high school located in northeast Baltimore, Maryland. The school was named after sociologist and civil-rights activist Dr. W. E. B. Du Bois. The school was situated in the former Northern High School and shared the structure with the Reginald F. Lewis High School. The school was closed in the summer of 2015 by Baltimore City Public Schools as part of its 21st Century Building project.

== Curriculum ==
W. E. B. Du Bois High School served students in Baltimore City, grades 9 through 12. The school specialized and emphasized in the focus of Environmental science. It had two Career and Technology Education Pathways of Agricultural & environmental science and Project Lead the Way (PLTW).

=== Extra curricular ===
In 2007, 5 students from Du Bois were selected to participate in the Baltimore Conservation Works program, a program employing local students in summer jobs related to conservation.
Students at Du Bois have also excelled in regional robotics competitions on the east coast. The Du Bois squad won the Rookie Inspiration Award at a competition in Annapolis, Maryland, in March 2006 and was invited to demonstrate in Chicago, Illinois, summer 2006, in front of the National Technical Association. 2 squad members were offered paid internships at NASA.

== History ==
Du Bois was formed along with Reginald Lewis and Samuel Banks high schools, following the breakup of Northern high school by the Baltimore City Board of school commissioners. The strategy was to make high schools smaller to help increase the student teacher ratio, increase parental involvement and improve student safety.

== Athletics and sports ==
The 2008 Panthers Football team for Du Bois won its first playoff game in school history against rival Reginald F. Lewis, 9–7. The team then lost to Paul Laurence Dunbar High School, 46–0, in the second round of the state playoffs, ending their season.

== Notable alumni ==
- Jahmar Young (born 1986), basketball player in the Israeli National League
