= Stonewood-Pentwood-Winston, Baltimore =

Neighborhood in Baltimore, Maryland, US

Stonewood-Pentwood-Winston
- Neighborhood of Baltimore
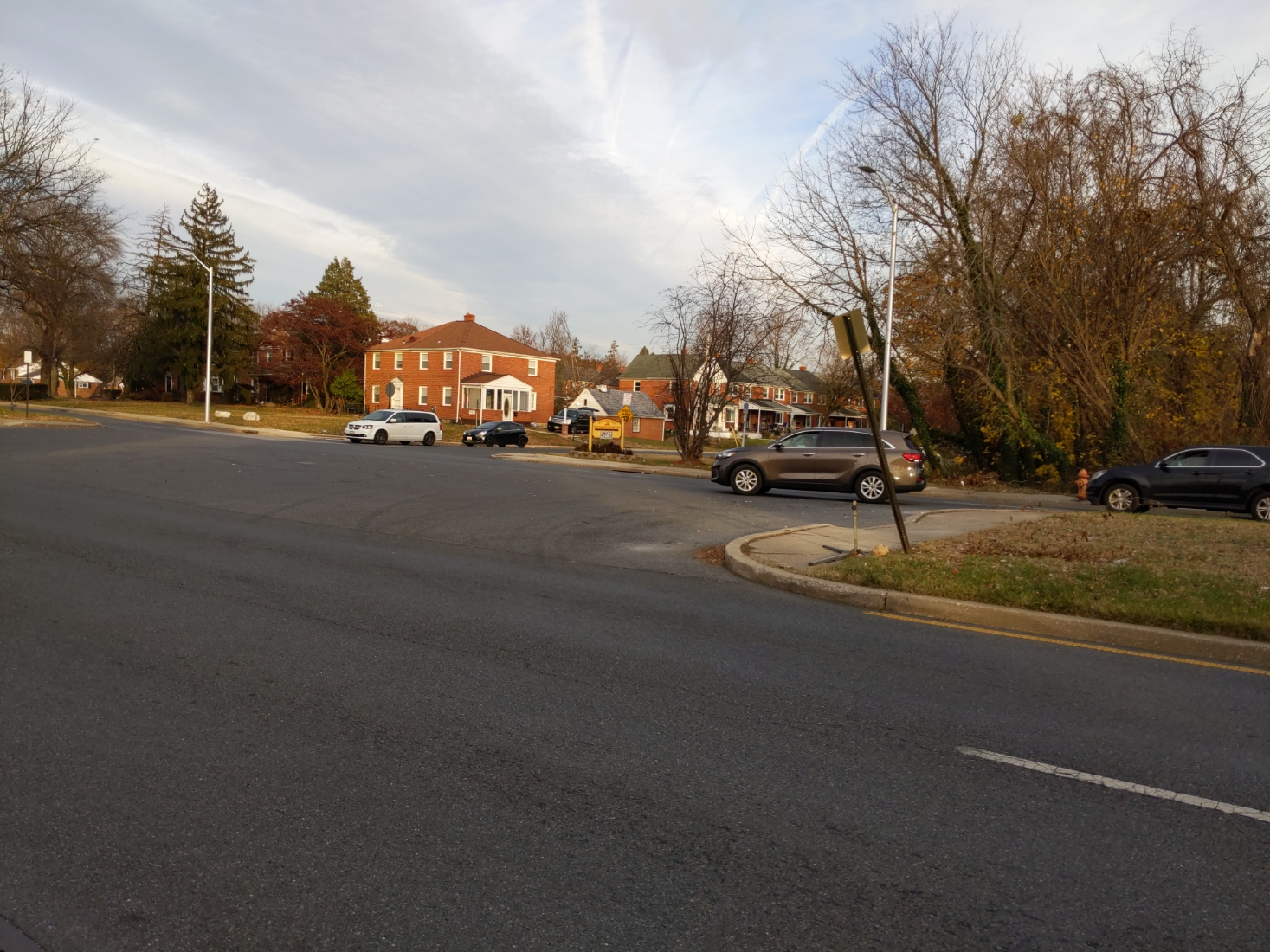
- View at the intersection of Loch Raven Boulevard and Pentwood Road in Stonewood-Pentwood-Winston, Baltimore

- Location within Baltimore Location within Maryland Location within the United States
- Coordinates: 39°20′44″N 76°35′19″W
- Country: United States
- State: Maryland
- City: Baltimore
- Time zone: UTC−5 (Eastern)
  - Summer (DST): UTC−4 (EDT)
- ZIP Codes: 21239, 21218
- Area Codes: 410, 443, 667

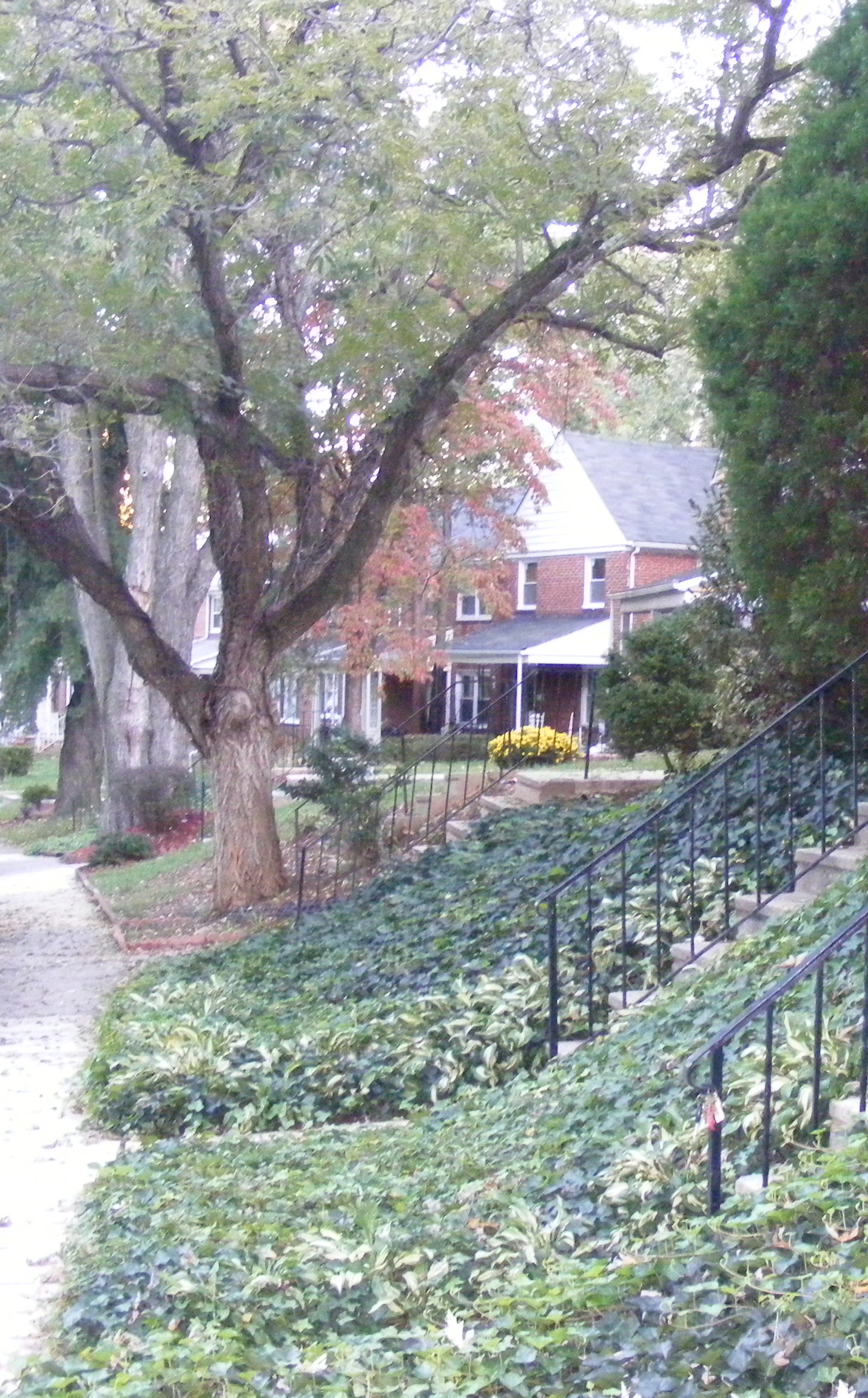
Homes on Stonewood Road in Baltimore.

Stonewood-Pentwood-Winston is a small community just west of Hillen Road and Morgan State University in Baltimore, Maryland, United States. The community association is aptly named the Stonewood-Pentwood-Winston Community Association and it has applied and received permission to have residential parking permits issued to its members as the result of the proliferation of students from Morgan parking in the neighborhood.

== Demographics ==
According to the 2000 US Census, 850 people live in Stonewood-Pentwood-Winston with 95.3% African-American and 4.1% White. The median household income is $40,321 and 60% of the houses are occupied.
