= Reginald F. Lewis High School =

Public high school in Maryland, USA

Reginald F. Lewis High School of Business and Law
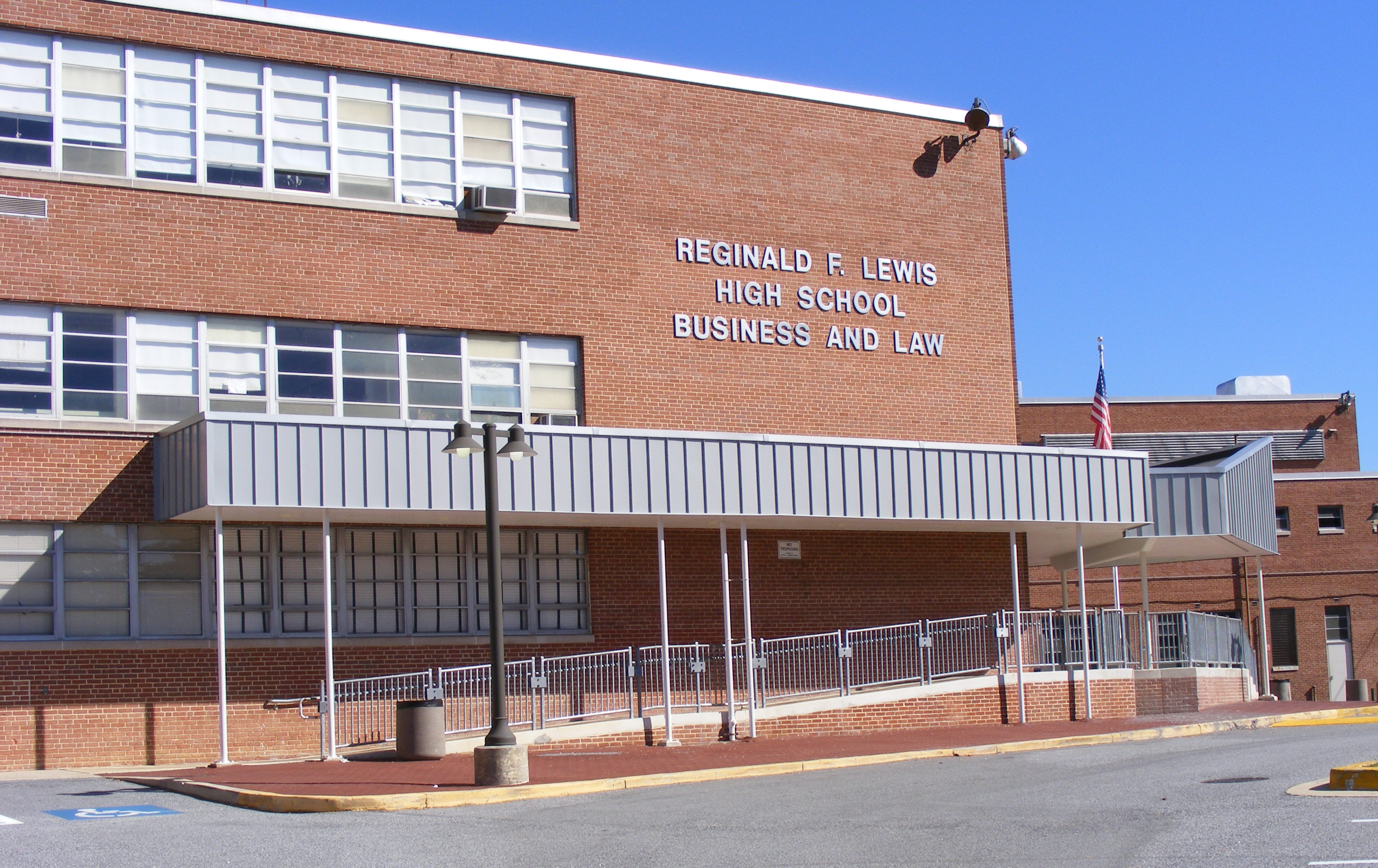

Location
- 6401 Pioneer Drive; Baltimore, Maryland 21214
- Coordinates: 39.36579°N 76.57099°W

Information
- School type: Public, Comprehensive
- Motto: Keep Going No Matter What
- Founded: 2002
- School district: Baltimore City Public Schools
- Superintendent: Gregory Thornton [CEO]
- School number: 419
- Principal: Janine L. Patterson
- Grades: 9–12
- Enrollment: 337 (2014)
- Area: Urban
- Colors: Black, Silver, White, Gold
- Slogan: Home of the Falcons
- Mascot: The Falcon
- Team name: Falcons
- Website: www.baltimorecityschools.org/o/rflewis

Reginald F. Lewis High School of Business and Law (officially referred to as the Reginald F. Lewis High School) is a public high school located in northeast Baltimore, Maryland. It is named after prominent businessman and Baltimore native Reginald F. Lewis. The school is situated in the former Northern High School and shares the structure with the W. E. B. Du Bois High School.

== Attack incidents ==
On April 4, 2008, an art teacher at the Reginald F. Lewis High School, was attacked by one of her students during a regular class. Footage of the incident was recorded on a phone and was uploaded to the internet.

On April 2, 2015, former Principal Daric Jackson caused a student to lose consciousness in a classroom after placing the student in a chokehold. The case was investigated as possible child abuse by the Baltimore police department and referred to the State's Attorney's office. The student filed a lawsuit in April 2016 alleging assault.

In early 2025, TikTok star “lkgainss”, known for being the “biggest 18 year old” at the school, was attacked by twenty former students, which is assumed to be over his reputation. Lkgainss soon used this to kickstart his TikTok career, starting a meme video with a repetitive format.
