= Edward Hughes Glidden =

American architect

Edward Hughes Glidden (1873 – May 2, 1924) was a Baltimore-based architect of many residential apartment buildings and commercial structures including the Sydenham Hospital and the Furness-Withy Building.

== History ==
Glidden was born in 1873. His father was William Pierce Glidden, the founder of the Glidden Varnish Company. Going against his father, he studied in Paris, France from 1908 to 1912, in order to become an architect. He returned to Baltimore, Maryland and established an office in the city. In the process, he began a partnership with Clyde Nelson Friz, creating the firm Glidden & Friz. During their partnership, he designed apartment houses such as Tudor Hall Apartments, Calvert Court Apartments, Canterbury Hall Apartments, Homewood Apartments, and Essex Hall.

He also designed Furness-Withy Building (also called the "Furness House"), Sydenham Hospital for Communicable Diseases, Latrobe Building, and The Esplanade with Friz, before their partnership ended in 1922. After their partnership ended, and before his death, he partnered with Hubert Upjohn and entered a competition to design new buildings for Baltimore City College.

Before his partnership with Friz, he designed buildings in Baltimore such as Mount Royal Apartments, Earl Court Apartments, the Washington Apartments, Rochambeau Apartments, and Marlborough Apartments. He used the names "E. H. Glidden" or "Edward M. Glidden" during his professional work.

He died on May 2, 1924 and was buried in Druid Ridge Cemetery in Pikesville, Maryland.

== Personal life ==
He had two children, Edward Hughes Glidden Jr. (1901–1975) and Pauline Glidden (1903–1968), with Pauline Boucher Hughes, both of whom were born in Baltimore. His son, Edward, would also become an architect.
