= Hebrew Orphan Asylum =

Hebrew Orphan Asylum may refer to:

- Hebrew Orphan Asylum (Baltimore, Maryland)
- Hebrew Orphan Asylum of New York
