= Clyde Nelson Friz =

American architect

Clyde Nelson Friz (1867–1942) was an architect in Baltimore, Maryland, who was active in his field from 1900 until his death in 1942. He is noted for designing the main Enoch Pratt Free Library Branch, the Scottish Rite Temple with John Russell Pope, the Standard Oil Building, and numerous residential commissions in Tuscany-Canterbury and elsewhere.

== History ==
Clyde Nelson Friz was born in 1867. From 1887 to 1890, he attended Washington University, in St. Louis, Missouri, and was in the School of Fine Arts.

In 1900, he began working in the architecture field, in which he would work until 1942, when he died in November of that year. In 1911, he began a partnership with fellow Baltimore architect Edward Hughes Glidden, forming the firm Glidden & Friz. During their partnership, which ended in 1922, they designed buildings including Tudor Hall Apartments, Essex Hall, Canterbury Hall Apartments, The Esplanade, Calvert Court Apartments, Furness-Withy Building (also called the "Furness House"), and Sydenham Hospital for Communicable Diseases.

He also did the architecture for the main Enoch Pratt Free Library Branch, which opened in 1933, the Scottish Rite Temple with John Russell Pope, and the Standard Oil Building, all in Baltimore.

Later, he worked with his son, Nelson Friz, on the architecture of the Clarksville High School in Clarksville, Maryland and the Loyola Federal Savings and Loan Association building in Baltimore, which later became the Liberal Arts and Policy Building of University of Baltimore. He also entered into a competition to design a new building at Baltimore City College, as did Edward Hughes Glidden, Joseph Evans Sperry, Edward L. Palmer Jr., and many others, but the design contract was awarded to the Buckler and Fenhagen firm in June 1924.

== Personal life ==
He married Ethel E. Murphy. He had three children with her: Clyde M. Friz and Nelson Friz, both of whom were born in 1906, and a daughter, Maynard.
