= Baltimore Heritage =

Nonprofit historic-preservation organization

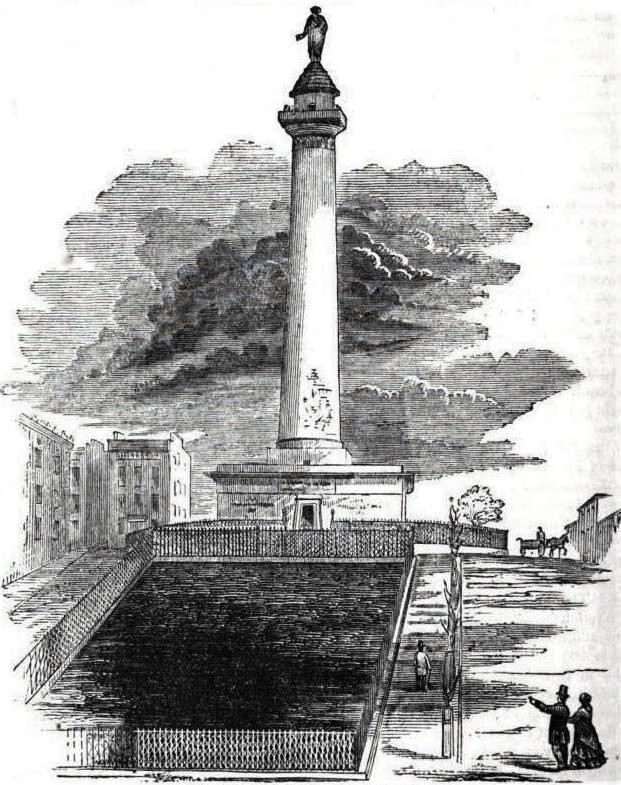
- Formation: • 1960 (founded) • 1961 (incorporated)
- Legal status: Nonprofit organization
- Purpose: Historic preservation
- Headquarters: 11/2 West Chase Street; Baltimore, Maryland, 21201; United States
- Coordinates: 39°18′8″N 76°37′1″W
- Region served: Baltimore City, Maryland
- Executive Director: Johns Hopkins
- Website: Official website

Baltimore Heritage is an American nonprofit historic-preservation organization headquartered in Baltimore, Maryland.

== Foundation ==
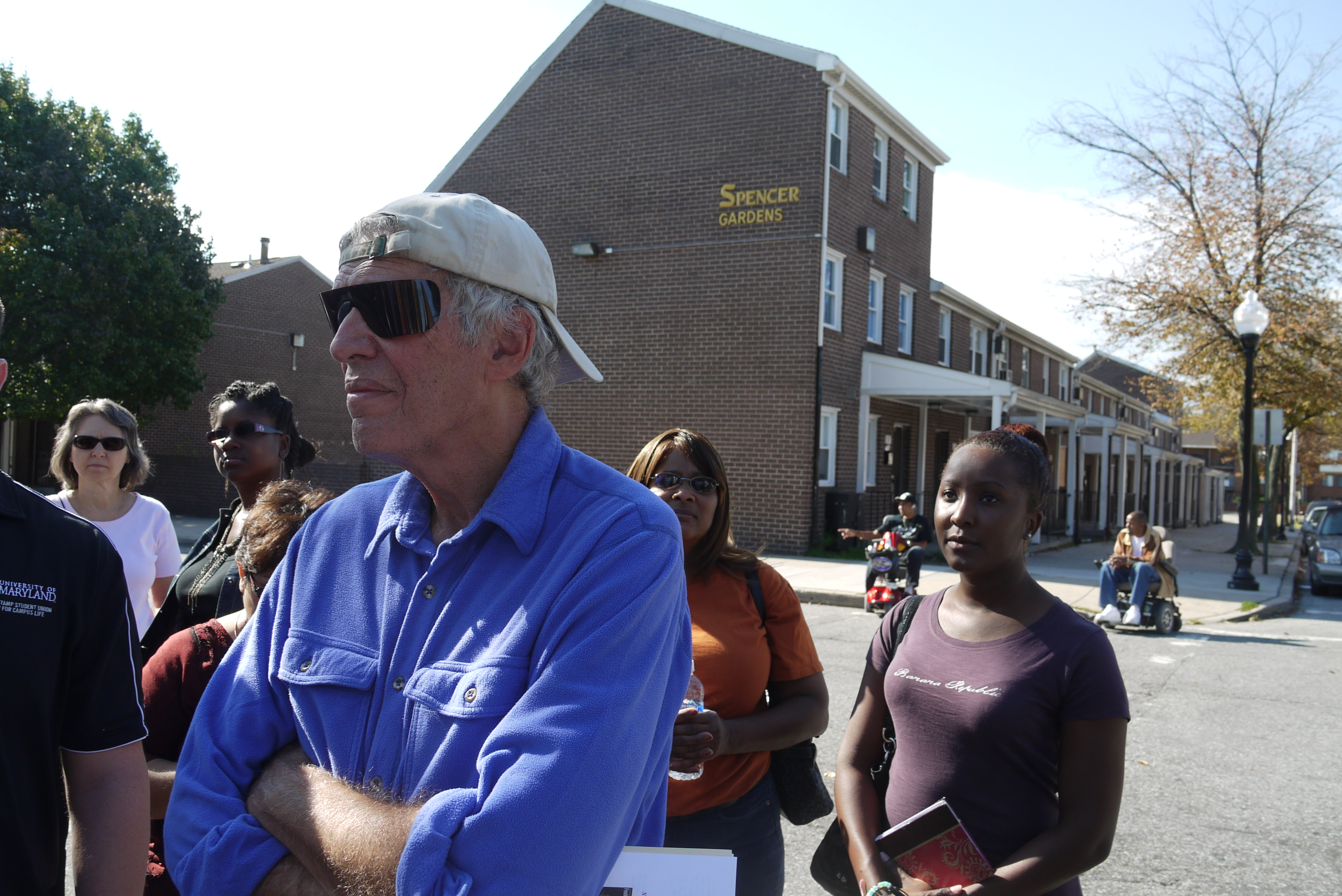
A Baltimore Heritage walking tour in Upton

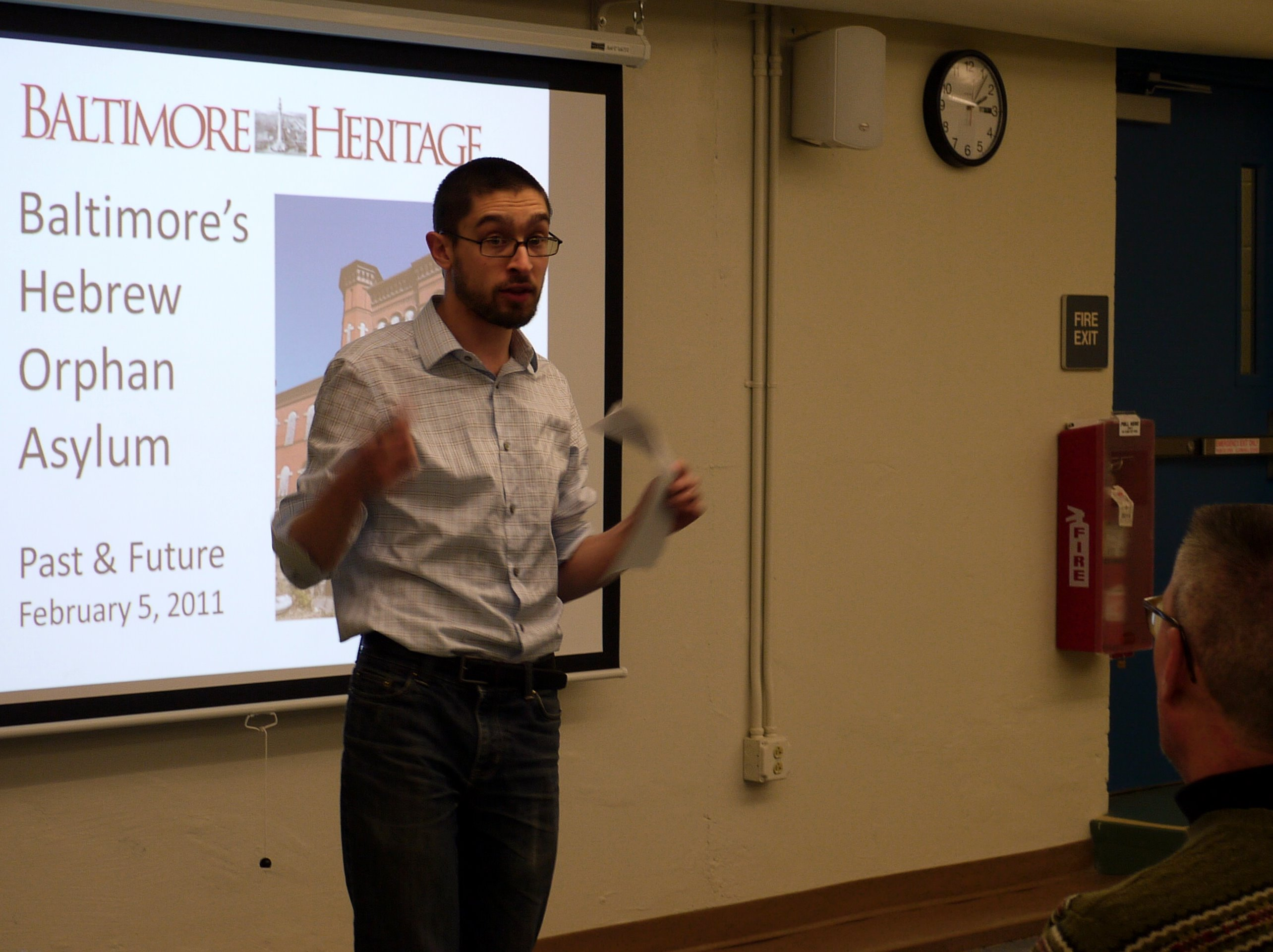
A Baltimore Heritage lecture on Baltimore's Hebrew Orphan Asylum at the Pratt Library Edmondson Avenue branch

Baltimore Heritage was founded in 1960 as an independent non-profit historic preservation advocacy organization. The organization has three staff members, thirty three volunteer board members, and a host of volunteers who work to preserve and promote Baltimore's historic buildings and neighborhoods.

Since 1960, the foundation has been helping neighborhood associations, residents and volunteers advocate for the preservation and reuse of historic buildings. From icons such as City Hall, the warehouses at Camden Yards, historic alley houses on Stirling Street and in the Otterbein neighborhood, Baltimore Heritage has helped lead efforts to protect Baltimore's historic places.

== Past Projects ==
Baltimore Heritage has successfully advocated for many historic places that were once threatened by demolition, including:

- Winans Mansion, Mount Vernon. This mansion is one of a few and possibly the only fully intact late nineteenth century urban mansions designed almost exclusively by Stanford White of McKim, Mead & White. The mansion is the epitome of cosmopolitan living in Baltimore, and was commissioned by Baltimore millionaire Ross R. Winans, heir to a fortune made by his father in St. Petersburg, Russia. The 46-room, brick and brownstone French Renaissance revival style mansion was built in 1882- featuring fine oak paneling, parquet, leaded glass, Tiffany designed tile and other fine materials throughout. The mansion remained a dominant architectural symbol of the neighborhood and has been used as a prep school for girls, a funeral parlor, and a doctors' offices. Baltimore Heritage listed the building on the Preservation Watch List in 2000, after it remained unoccupied for many years. A multimillion-dollar historic renovation of the estate took place in 2005, that gained distinction by winning a preservation honor later that year. The building is currently owned by Agora Inc.
- Scottish Rite Temple of the Freemasons. Construction began on this historic structure in 1930, and the building was officially opened in 1932. The building was designed by architect Clyde Friz (Enoch Pratt Free Library, Standard Oil Building) and John Russell Pope (Jefferson Memorial, National Archives, National Gallery of Art, Masonic Temple of the Scottish Rite in Washington D.C.). The temple on Charles Street is both Italian Renaissance and Beaux Arts Classical in style, with a columned portico based on the Pantheon in Rome. The Scottish Rite Masonic Order continues to occupy the building. After considering selling the building for demolition in 2009 (the same year it was added to the city's list of historic landmarks), the Mason's are reconsidering.
- Castalia. Virgil Hillyer, the first headmaster of the Calvert School, built Castalia between 1928 and 1929. It was named after the spring at the foot of Mount Parnassas in Italy that is said to have been inspiration for the muses. The prominent Baltimore architect Francis Hall Fowler was the principal architect of the Italian-inspired house. It was proposed for demolition in 2006 by the Calvert School, who hoped to construct an outdoor amphitheater in its place. The Baltimore Heritage filed a successful nomination for the building to be added to the city's historic landmark list, and the building was saved.
- 400 block of West Baltimore Street. This was the location of the first toll booth on the National Road. The block, across from the iconic Hippodrome Theater, is a mostly intact street wall of historic properties and includes two of the last nine full cast iron fronted buildings still standing in Baltimore. After plans called for the demolition of much of the south side of the block that were abandoned in 2009, the block has seen significant rehabilitation of its historic structures. Baltimore Heritage removed the block from the Historic Preservation Watch list in July 2010 in recognition of the substantial rehabilitation and renovation that has signaled a commitment to retain the historic buildings in this important part of the west side of downtown.

== Current preservation priorities ==
- Clifton Park Valve House. Built in 1887–1888, it was used to build machinery used in the operation of Lake Clifton, once a major part of the city's water supply and was connected to Lake Montebello to the north by a 108-inch underground pipe. Lake Clifton began to be filled and developed in 1962, and the Valve House was no longer needed and eventually abandoned. By 1971, the building was in a serious state of disrepair. Baltimore City owns the building, and recent plans for private restoration have failed.
- Eastern Female High School. This former school has been a landmark since 1976, and was declared one of Baltimore's "architectural gems" in a March 8, 2002 Baltimore Sun editorial. This structure is the city's oldest surviving purpose-built public school building. It was renovated and converted to apartments in the 1970s, but is currently owned by Sojourner–Douglass College, and has been vacant since 2004.
- Old Town Mall, Old Town. The 500 block of Gay Street in Jonestown is a full block of intact historic commercial properties that contain more than two hundred years of architectural heritage. The street is lined with solid brick buildings that date to the 1820s. In 1968, the street was closed to vehicular traffic to create a pedestrian walkway that the city hoped would help business. Today, the Baltimore Development Corporation is overseeing a large redevelopment for the area. There is no plan to demolish any of the buildings, but many are in desperate need of renovation.
- Pennsylvania Railroad Building. The structure was originally built to house the Baltimore branch offices of the Pennsylvania Railroad Company. The building reflects the architectural trends in Baltimore's business and financial center following the Great Fire of Baltimore on February 7–8, 1904. Adjacent buildings were recently demolished for a surface parking lot, and the building has been considered for demolition as well. The building lies within the boundaries of the Business & Government National Register Historic District, and it was featured in the Built to Last exhibit at the Maryland Historical Society in 2002.
- Fell's Point Wooden Houses. Once a staple of the Baltimore landscape, wooden houses from the late eighteenth century are now endangered. Fell's Point has the highest collection of remaining wooden structures with eight. In 1799, the fear of fire prompted city officials to prohibit building new structures of wood within the city center. Although the ordinance didn't apply to Fell's Point, new construction was primarily down with brick, as in downtown Baltimore. The houses were identified from the late 1700s by Stacy Patterson from Baltimore Heritage in 2006.
- McKim's Free School. The 1833 building is one of Baltimore's most important landmarks, with deep roots in the city's history an unsurpassed 175 year record of education and social service. Since 1833, the building has served as a free school. The McKim center has continued to strengthen the importance of the building to many Baltimore residents as it remains a vital institution serving children and adults in need in the Jonestown community in numerous ways. Director Dwight Warren arrived at the school fifty years ago, and continues the essential mission of serving the community in many ways. The building was recently listed on the 2011 list of Maryland's Most Endangered historic places and the center is working with the National Trust for Historic Preservation, Preservation Maryland, and Baltimore Heritage to find new ways to organize support for this essential building and institution.

== Lost projects ==
Baltimore City loses historic buildings to active demolition and neglect. The following places are those for which Baltimore Heritage unsuccessfully advocated for preservation.

- The Rochambeau Apartments: a contributing building in the Cathedral Hill National Register Historic District. It was an iconic building along Baltimore's historic Charles Street. The Archdiocese of Baltimore demolished the building in 2006 and plans to erect a prayer garden on the site.
- Monumental Motorcar Company: built in 1915, the showroom known as the Odorite was one of the last surviving buildings relating to the early automobile era alone Mount Royal Avenue. The University of Baltimore razed the building in 2004 over the objections of Baltimore Heritage, the Mount Vernon Belvedere Association, and the Maryland Advisory Council on Historic Preservation. The site now houses the University of Baltimore Student Center.
- 300 St. Paul Place: built during the 1820s, the row of houses on this block were erected in the aftermath of the War of 1812. By 1890, the houses played a central role in Baltimore's African American community as the location of the school for the St. Francis Xavier Church, the first Catholic Church for African Americans in the country. Mercy Hospital demolished the buildings in 2007, with the intentions of constructing a new building on the site.

== See also ==
- History of Baltimore
- Maryland Historical Society
