= Ulysses (hotel) =

Hotel in Baltimore, Maryland

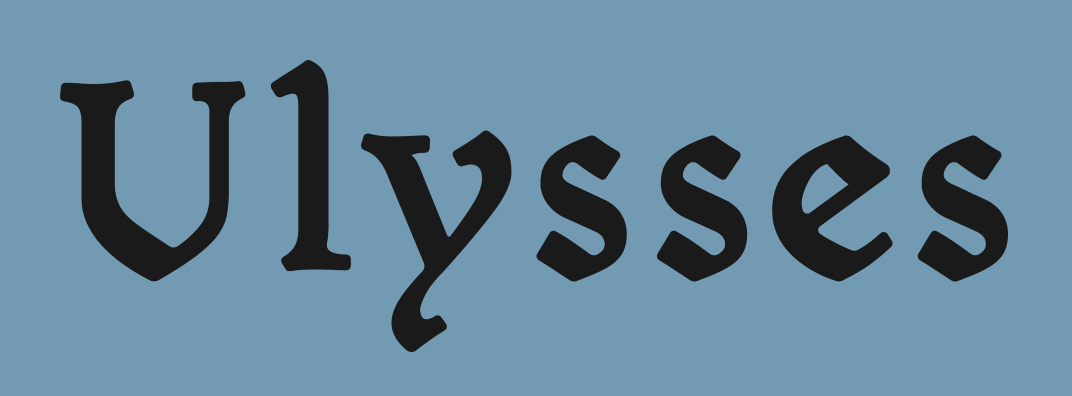

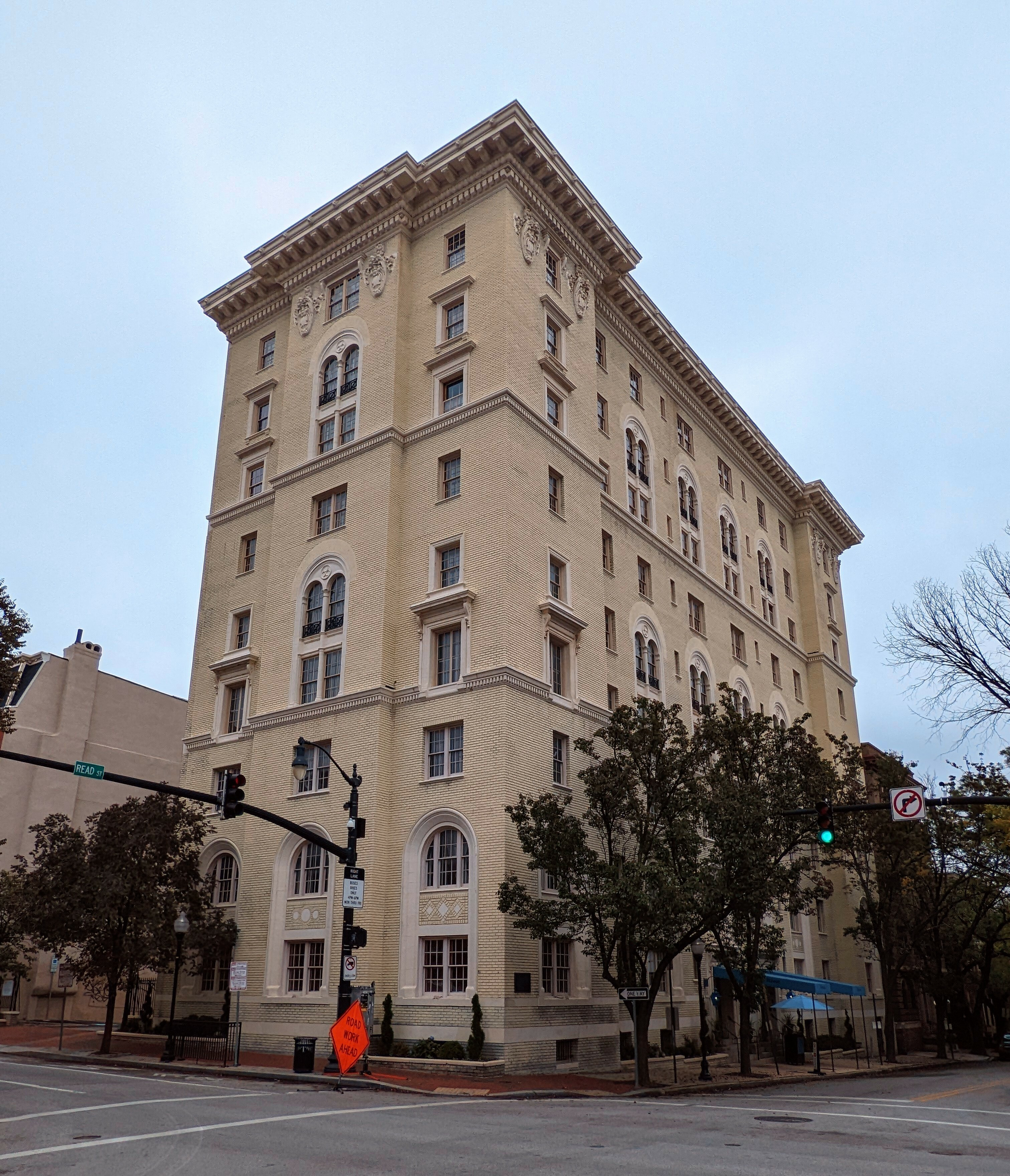
- Alternative names: Latrobe Building

General information
- Architectural style: Early Italian Renaissance Revival
- Location: 2 E. Read Street, Baltimore, Maryland
- Coordinates: 39.299817°N 76.615502°W
- Completed: 1912
- Opened: 2022 (Ulysses hotel)
- Owner: Ash (also developer)

Technical details
- Floor count: 9

Design and construction
- Architects: Edward Hughes Glidden, Clyde Nelson Friz

Other information
- Number of rooms: 116
- Number of restaurants: 1
- Number of bars: 2

Website
- ash.world/hotels/ulysses/

Ulysses is a boutique hotel in the Mount Vernon neighborhood of Baltimore. The hotel has 116 guest rooms, an all-day restaurant, and a late-night lounge. Its design is maximalist with inspirations from the time the structure was built as well as the films of director John Waters, along with elements of Indian design.

The hotel opened in 2022 in the nine-story Latrobe Building, designed by Edward Hughes Glidden and Clyde Nelson Friz in the Italian Renaissance Revival style. It was constructed in 1912 as The Latrobe, to house 44 apartments, though office space gradually increased in the building. The interior was significantly renovated for office use in the 1980s, although this use declined by the 1990s, and it was sold at foreclosure in 2016. Ash, a design and development firm, purchased and renovated the building, opening the hotel in September 2022.

The building is within the City of Baltimore's Mount Vernon Historic District.

== History ==
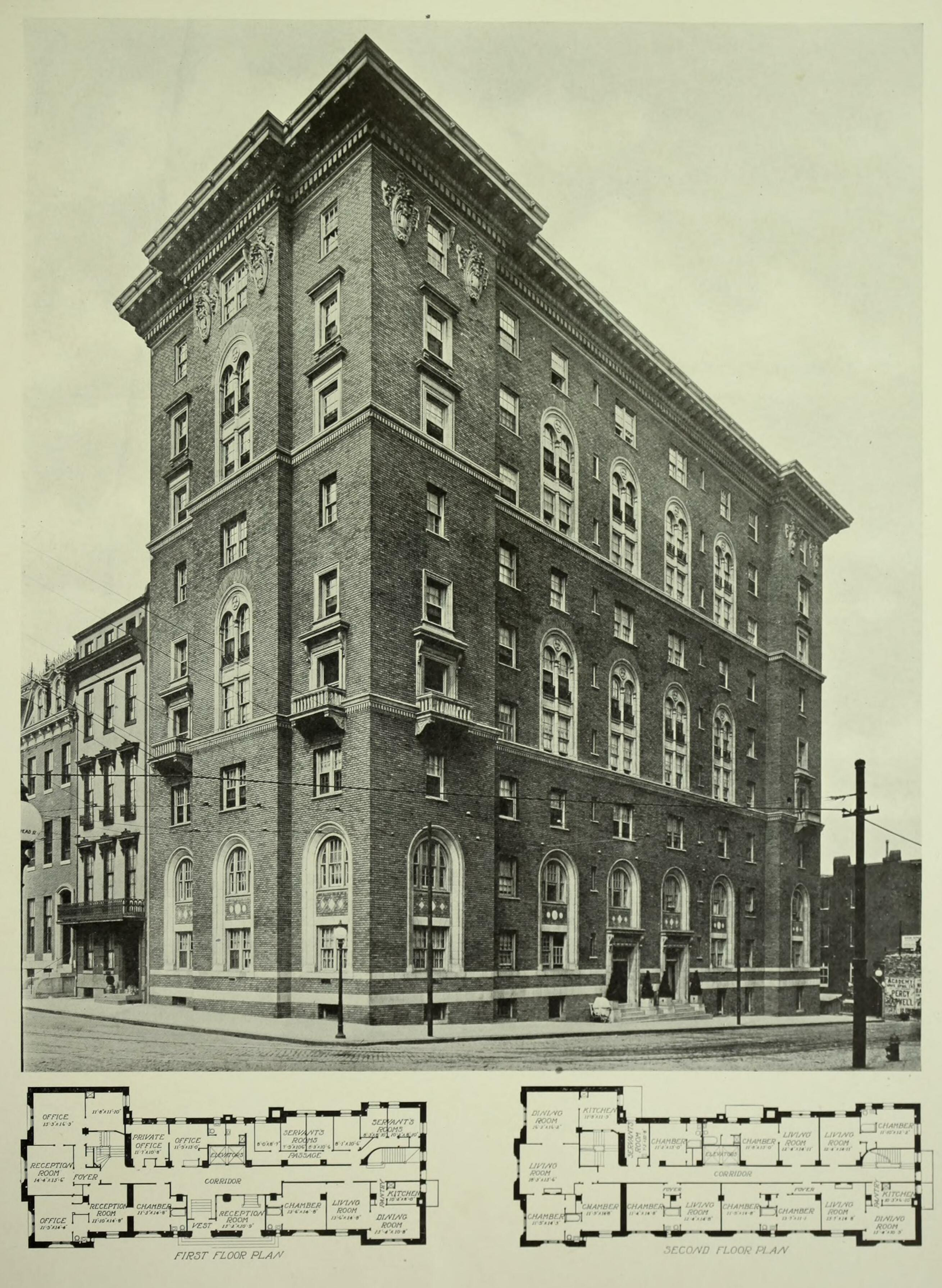
The building and its floorplans c. 1913

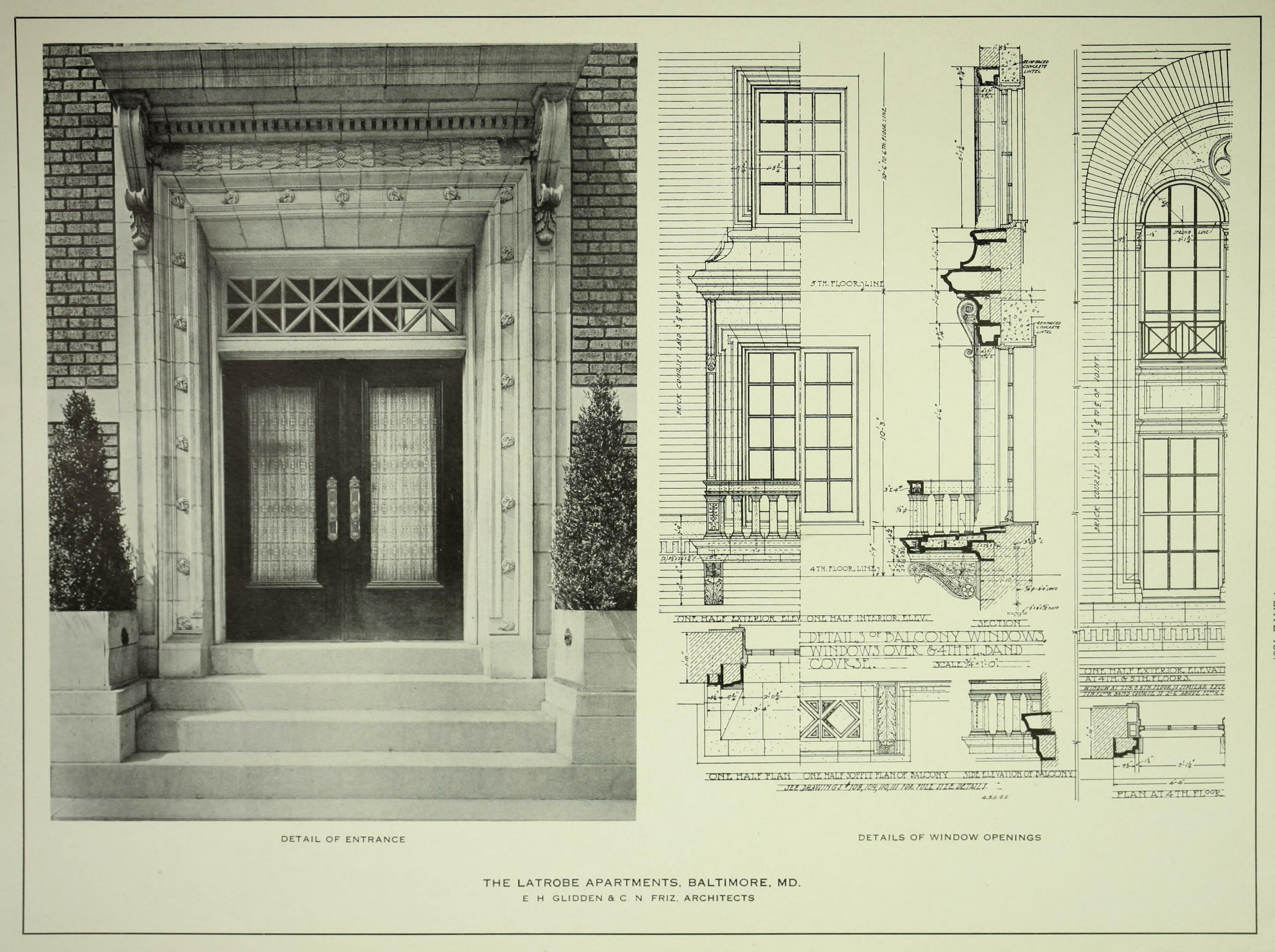
Architectural details c. 1913

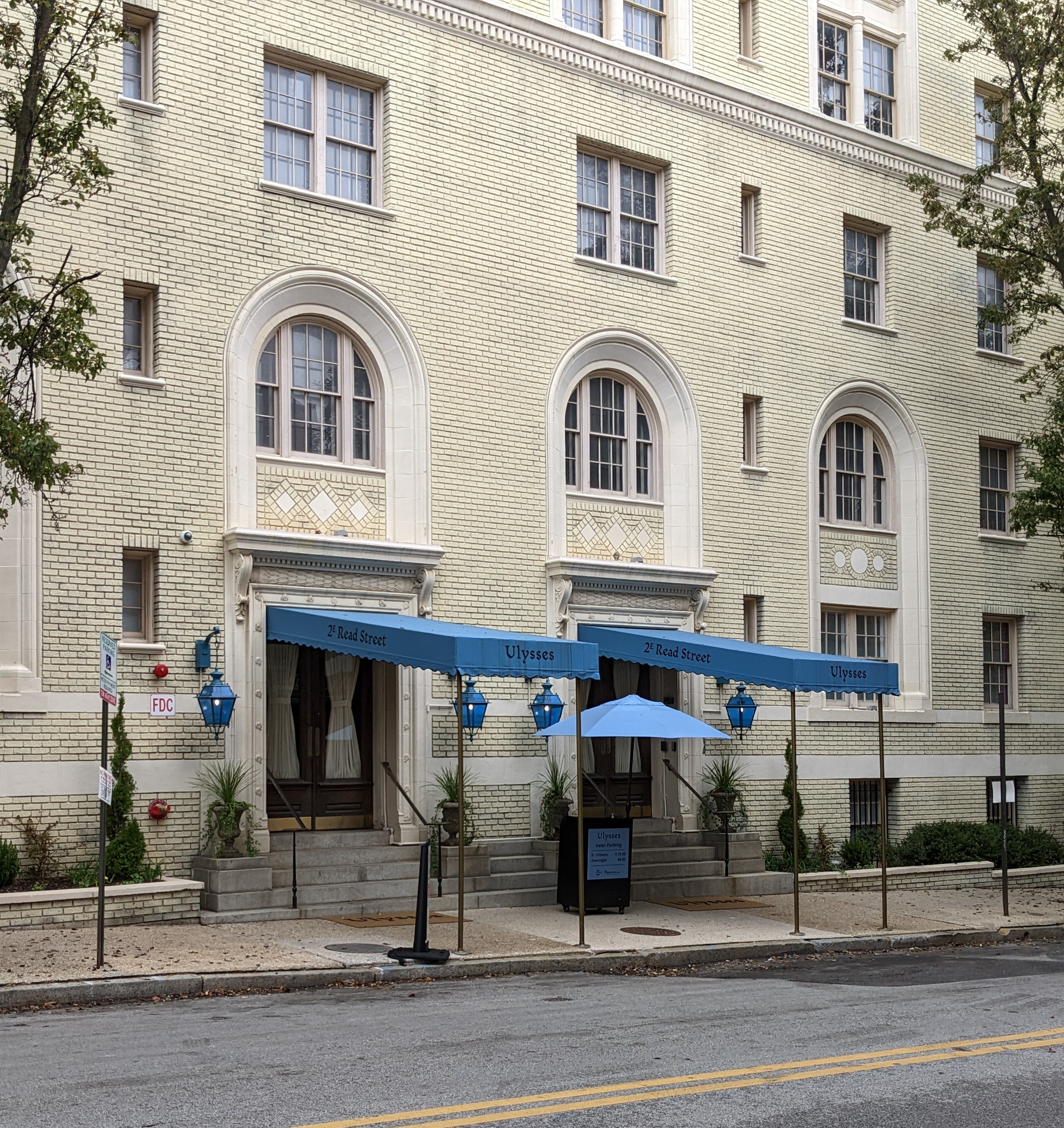
Main entrances on Read Street

The building stands on the site of the Latrobe House, a mansion built for lawyer and inventor John H. B. Latrobe. At the time, the area had numerous large mansions owned by prominent Baltimore residents. Latrobe died in 1891, outlived by his wife, who died in 1903. The property was sold and its redevelopment was announced in 1911. Clinton L. Riggs redeveloped the property, demolishing the house along with his own house to the east, to create a nine-story apartment building. He named the building The Latrobe, after the building it replaced or after its owner or his son, Ferdinand C. Latrobe, a seven-term mayor of Baltimore.

The Latrobe Building was designed by Edward Hughes Glidden and Clyde Nelson Friz in an early Italian Renaissance Revival style. It was constructed in 1912 as an apartment building for wealthy single men, The building originally had 44 units, many of which were large, although there were also numerous small "bachelor flats". The design also included communal dining and living spaces on the first floor.

By the 1960s, the Latrobe was renovated for office use, and housed physicians, architects, and engineers. The building was fully renovated for office use in the 1980s, beginning in 1983, by Cochran Stephenson & Donkervoet at a cost of $3.5 million. The firm, which was based in the building, moved out in 1996, leaving the building practically empty. The renovation had included constructing an addition with CMUs against the north façade of the building, infilling a setback area at the back of the building. A 1984 plaque on the south façade of the structure commemorates prominent members of the Latrobe family and the building's renovation.

The building was sold in a foreclosure auction in 2016 and resold in June 2017 for $3 million to Ash, a design and development firm. In 2018, the firm announced plans to convert the building into a 105-unit hotel in an urban, "edgy" style. The opening of the hotel was part of a 21st-century revitalization of the Mount Vernon neighborhood, after a severe city-wide downturn in the 1990s. Ulysses was designed and opened by Ash, a New York-based design firm and developer. It is the company's fourth hotel it opened, after completing hotels in Providence, Detroit, and New Orleans. The firm bought the hotel reportedly "sight unseen" at auction and began redeveloping the hotel soon afterward. Much of the construction took place amid the COVID-19 pandemic shutdowns, leading the work to go relatively unnoticed. The hotel opened on September 21, 2022.

== Attributes ==
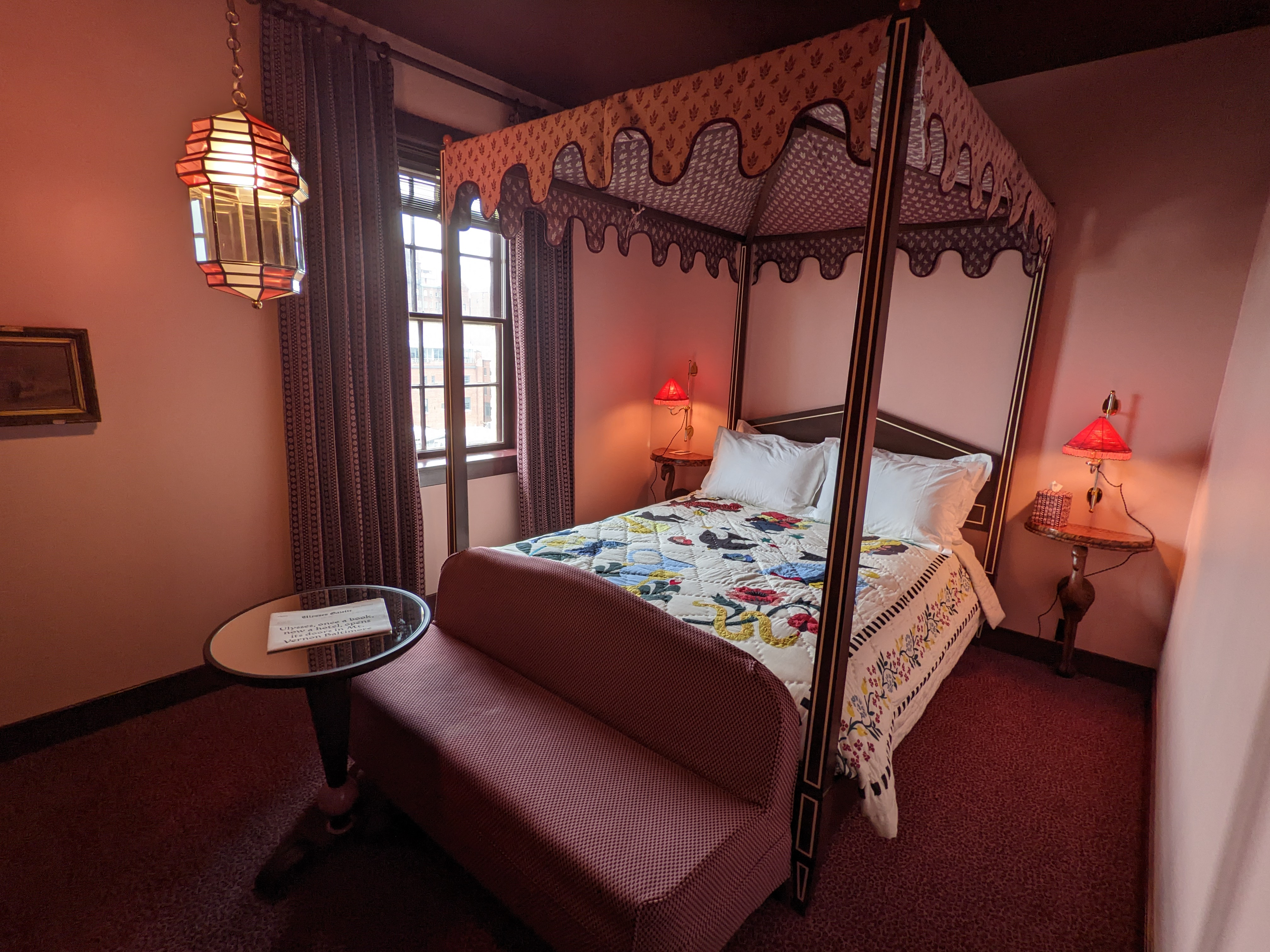
Queen bedroom in the hotel

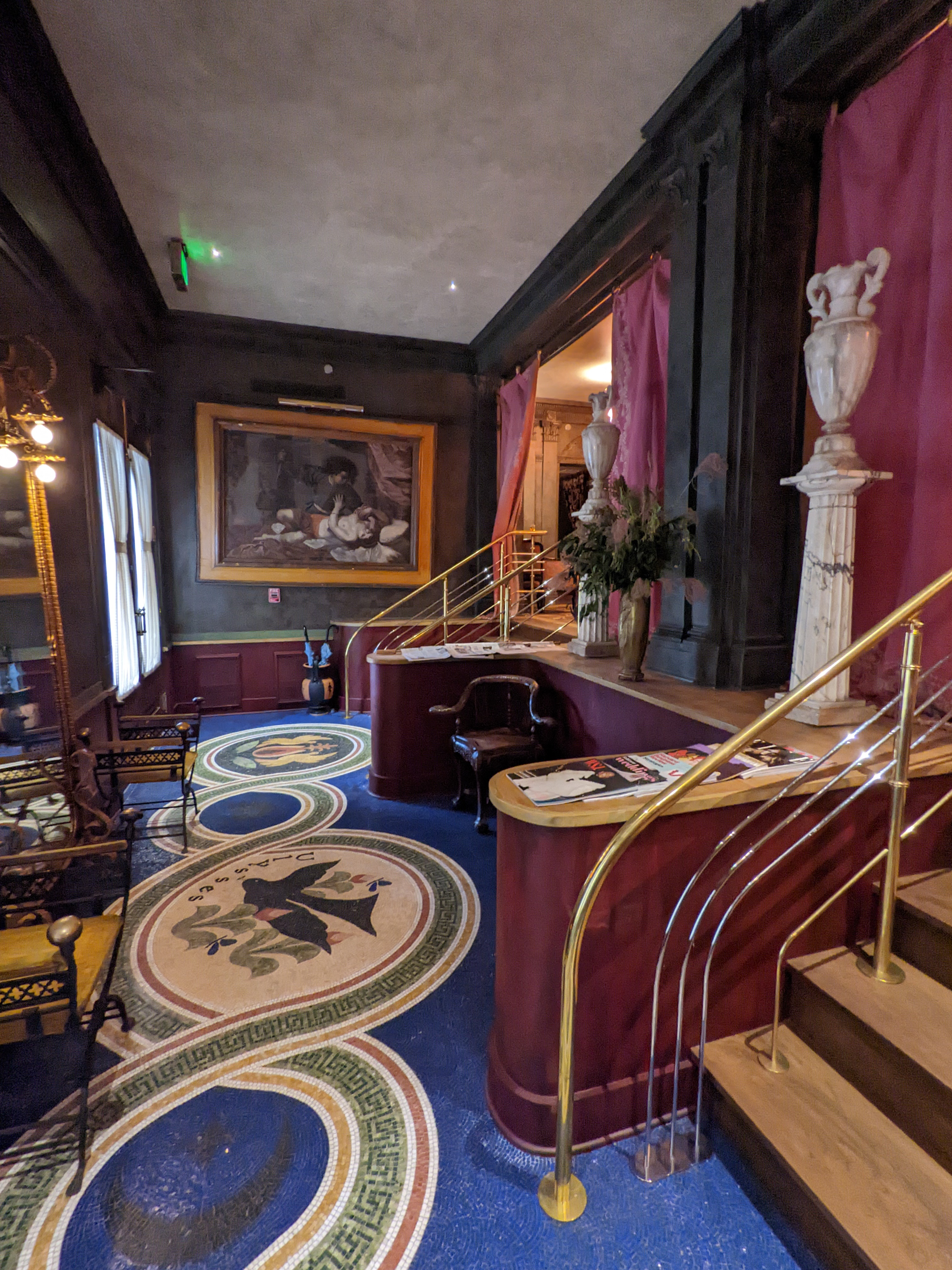
Lobby vestibule

The building is located on the northeast corner of Charles and Read Streets in Baltimore, in the Mount Vernon neighborhood. The building has nine stories, with a decorative brick exterior. The exterior originally featured unpainted dark gray wire-cut brick with architraves, the cornice, and other decorative features made with a light shade of terra cotta. The exterior is today fully painted. Architectural features of the exterior include recessed mortar joints, terra cotta belt courses and window surrounds, and a highly ornate cornice. The Brickbuilder described its facades as Florentine-inspired, pleasing, fitting in well in its surroundings, and with a restrained hand on fanciful ornament. The building has a combined floor area of about 45,000 square feet (4,200 m^{2}).

The hotel has maximalist interiors inspired by film director and Baltimore native John Waters and inspired by the time the hotel was built, 1911–1912, a time where the ornate Art Nouveau was giving way to more streamlined styles. Textures and patterns, including scalloped canopies, block-printed robes, and beaded lamp-shades are inspired by India (the chief creative officer visited the country in 2020). The Art Deco touches are a nod to train cars and ocean liners. These elements, including materials, patterns, and textures, combine in a way to give the interior spaces a cinematic and vintage feel.

According to the New York Times, the hotel was named for the Ulysses, a ship that brought Bavarian immigrants to Baltimore in 1838. Architectural Digest describes the name as referencing "the stream-of-consciousness style of James Joyce's novel as well as Ash's own fictional protagonist, who Cooper lovingly describes as "a limp-wristed bachelor home from a grand tour.""

Original elements of the building still extant include intricate molding and a brass postal box and chute in the lobby, as well as a delicate stained glass skylight on the ninth floor of the building.

The hotel's eight upper floors are dedicated to guest rooms. These floors and their rooms are styled with four different color palates: red, yellow, green, and blue. All of the hotel's bedrooms make use of hickory wood furniture as well as textiles designed by Ash. These rooms also include hand-beaded lampshades from Jaipur atop bedside tables supported by carved flamingos. Flamingos are present in other decorative elements of the building, a nod to Waters' 1972 film Pink Flamingos. Some of these rooms have wall-to-wall leopard spot carpeting. The four-poster beds have scalloped canopies and are adorned with colorful quilts, in the Baltimore album style and hand-embroidered in Rajasthan, India. The rooms' bathrooms have mirrors shaped like amphorae and make use of high-gloss burl paneling.

There are four suites in the hotel, one in each shade the hotel employs in its design. Each room features a clawfoot tub; some have the tub located in the center of the suite. One suite takes the name of Our Lady of the Flowers, a 1943 novel that is a favorite of John Waters. Another, The Dasher, is named after characters from Waters' 1974 film Female Trouble. A third is named Il Gattopardo, a 1958 novel, and a fourth is named The Tomorrow, for a character in Polyester, a 1981 John Waters film.

=== Food and drink ===
Bloom's, the hotel's late-night bar, has crimson banquettes, purple stools, and a mirrored ceiling and bar counter. The crimson channel-tufted banquettes were designed by George Smith. The room's design was likened to "John Waters's signature mix of sleaze, camp and art", and was described in Architectural Digest as "kaleidoscopic" and "decadent" with its features. The bar is located to the right of the lobby from the entrance. It serves classic cocktails including French martinis, Midori sours, and gimlets, as well as a customizable old fashioned with unique cordials.

The hotel's all-day restaurant and bar, Ash Bar, has a continental menu, inspired by steam trains' dining cars and European salons. Its menu includes bouillabaisse, club sandwiches, and Caesar salads. The restaurant's design includes the use of rattan furniture and high-gloss burl paneling inlaid with steel.
