= CMTA =

CMTA may refer to:

- California Municipal Treasurers Association, a professional organization of California county, city, and special district public treasurers.
- Canadian Marine Transportation Administration, Canadian government entity, responsible for marine transportation
- Capital Metropolitan Transportation Authority, a public transit provider owned by the city of Austin, Texas.
- Central Maryland Transportation Alliance, a coalition of Baltimore area business, civic and nonprofit leaders intent on improving travel efficiency within Central Maryland.
- Certified Metabolic Typing Advisor, a professional certification for a diet-related holistic health care sub-speciality.
- Charcot-Marie-Tooth Association, which supports the development of new drugs to treat Charcot–Marie–Tooth disease.
- Christian Music Trade Association, an organization associated with the Christian music industry that focuses on traditional Gospel music, Southern Gospel music, and Contemporary Christian music.
