= Henry Roby =

Henry Roby may refer to:

- Henry John Roby (1830–1915), English classical scholar and politician
- Henry Albert Roby (1844–1905), American architect
