= Standard Oil Building (Baltimore, Maryland) =

- U.S. National Register of Historic Places
- Baltimore City Landmark
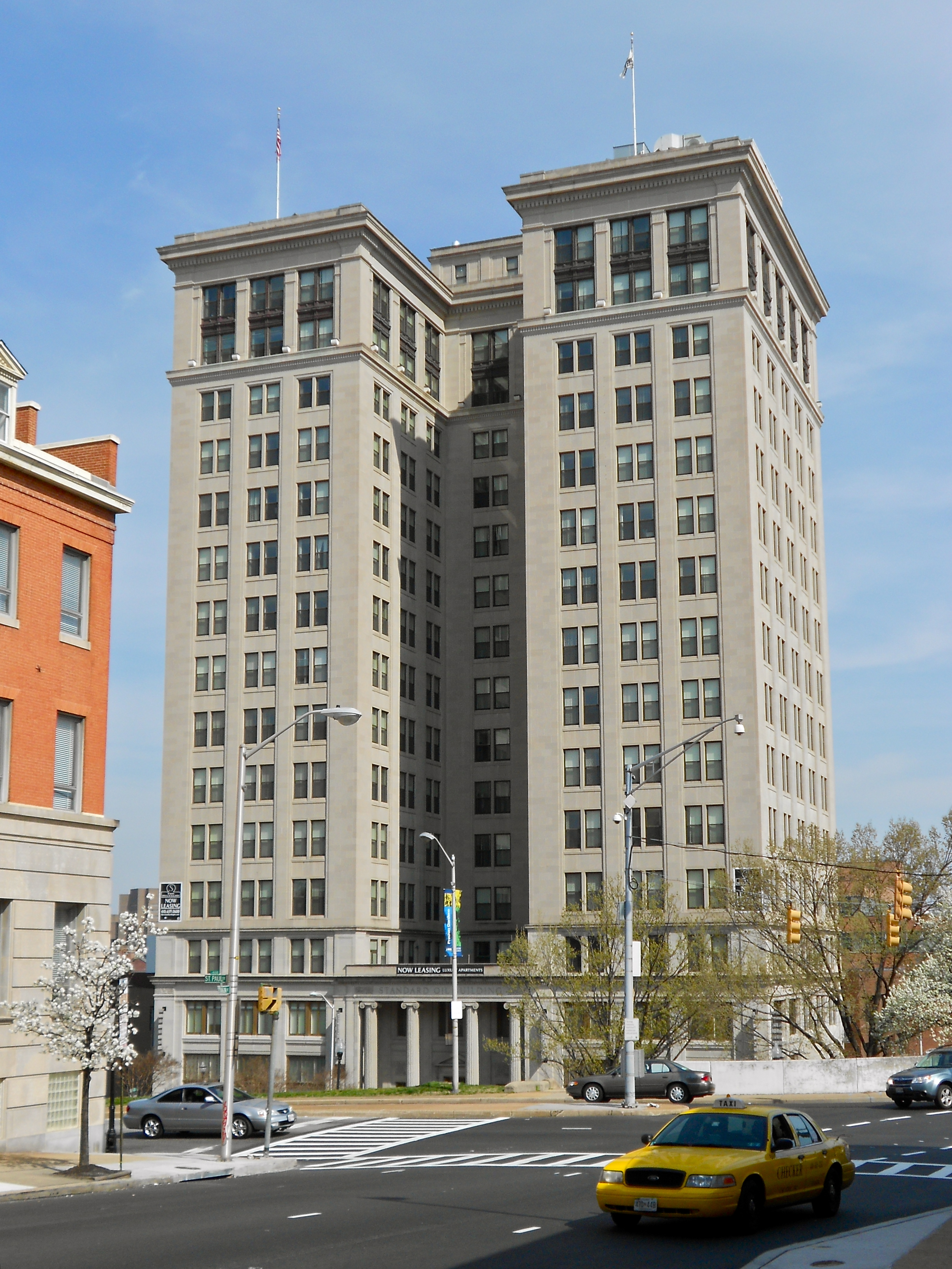
- Standard Oil Building, March 2012
- Interactive map of Standard Oil Building
- Location: 501 St. Paul St., Baltimore, Maryland
- Coordinates: 39°17′43″N 76°36′49″W
- Area: less than one acre
- Built: 1922
- Architect: Friz, Clyde N.
- Architectural style: Beaux Arts
- NRHP reference No.: 00001461

Significant dates
- Added to NRHP: December 1, 2000
- Designated BCL: 1999

Standard Oil Building, also known as the Stanbalt Building, is a historic office building located at Baltimore, Maryland, United States. It is a 15-story Beaux Arts skyscraper designed by Clyde N. Friz (1867-1942), one of Baltimore's best-known Beaux Arts designers, and built in 1922. The steel-frame U-shaped office building is clad in limestone. It was built by the Standard Oil Company at a time when that business was once one of the nation's principal corporations, the dominant supplier of gasoline and fuels.

Standard Oil Building was listed on the National Register of Historic Places in 2000. In its later years as an office building, the building primarily housed offices for the City of Baltimore. Following an extensive, $25 million renovation, the building reopened as residential apartments in 2002 by the Southern Management Corporation.
