= Central Maryland Transportation Alliance =

The Central Maryland Transportation Alliance (CMTA) is a coalition of Baltimore area business, civic and nonprofit groups intent on improving travel within Central Maryland, which consists of Baltimore City and the surrounding jurisdictions of Anne Arundel County, Baltimore County, Carroll County, Harford County and Howard County. The group's stated objectives are to reduce congestion, limit sprawl, increase job opportunities and make it easier, faster and more efficient for anyone to travel within Central Maryland.

The coalition is Maryland's most comprehensive regional alliance that focuses on transportation issues. Its board consists of advocates, business leaders and representatives of civic and non-profit institutions. The board is chaired by James L. Shea, who chairs the law firm of Venable LLP. The President and CEO of CMTA is Brian O'malley.

CMTA's role is to advocate for the development and the implementation of a comprehensive, innovative Baltimore regional transportation plan. CMTA seeks to act as a convener of the region's diverse interest groups; as an adviser to city, county, state and federal government officials, and as a coordinator of short-term and long-term efforts to improve transportation in Central Maryland.

== History ==
The Central Maryland Transportation Alliance was formed in 2007 as a diverse coalition of corporate and civic leaders uniting business, philanthropic and institutional sectors around a common agenda: improving and expanding transportation options for the citizens and businesses of Central Maryland.

Sponsors of CMTA include The Annie E. Casey Foundation, the Baltimore Community Foundation, the Goldseker Foundation, Bank of America, M&T Bank, Mercy Medical Center, Associated Black Charities, the Baltimore Ravens, Clayton Baker Trust, H & S Properties, Lockhart Vaughn Foundation, Monumental Life, Otis Warren & Company, PNC Bank, the Rauch Foundation, Southern Management Corporation, Struever Brothers, Eccles & Rouse, the Surdna Foundation, Venable LLP and the William G. Baker, Jr. Memorial Fund.

Other groups represented on the Board of Directors are the Downtown Partnership of Baltimore, the BWI Partnership, the Metropolitan Baltimore Council AFL-CIO Unions, Veolia Transportation, the Urban League of Greater Baltimore, ULI Baltimore, Citizens Planning & Housing Association, Colliers Pinkard, Economic Alliance of Greater Baltimore, 1000 Friends of Maryland, Baltimore City Public School System, LS Consulting, Inc., and the Baltimore Washington Corridor Chamber.

== Vision ==
CMTA aims to create a thriving metropolitan Baltimore that boasts an array of transportation options–including a coordinated system of highways and interconnected mass transit options that allow citizens to move smoothly, efficiently and inexpensively throughout the region. The group has established a decision matrix, abbreviated as R3=E3, to determine which projects to support. Projects must be regional, rapid, and reliable transit and transportation initiatives (the 3 Rs) that result in economic growth, equitable access, and environmental protection (the 3 Es).

CMTA has been especially active in promoting the proposed 14-mile Red Line for Baltimore, extending from the federal government office complexes in Woodlawn in western Baltimore County, through the downtown business district to Johns Hopkins Bayview Medical Campus on the city's eastern edge. The Red Line is unpopular in the neighborhoods along Edmondson Avenue and in the Canton community, where, due to cost cuts, trains would run at street level. A coalition representing those neighborhoods, called The West-East Coalition, says that it supports mass transit but not the street-level segments proposed for the Red Line. The group maintains a website called The Baltimore Red Line Underground.

CMTA co-sponsored “Transit around the Nation,” a set of tours by community and civic representatives to cities with Light Rail projects under construction.[7] In August 2008, CMTA held a meeting during the Democratic National Convention in Denver for members of the Maryland delegation to hear from leaders of Denver's Regional Transportation District about political and fiscal challenges of building a Light Rail line.

CMTA held a series of press conferences to announce support for a preferred alternative route for the Red Line. These media events featured business leaders, union leaders, education and medical officials and political leaders from Baltimore City and from the surrounding counties endorsing Alternative 4C. CMTA also participated in outreach meetings with other constituencies to explain the importance of this east-west line. In October 2008, CMTA's board of directors announced its endorsement of Alternative 4C for the Red Line. This Light Rail route includes two tunnel alignments to avoid community opposition and downtown disruptions.

CMTA also took the lead in advocating for Alternative 4C during the public hearings on the Draft Environmental Impact Statement for the Red Line in November 2008 and during the 90-day comment period, ending Jan. 5, 2009.

In January 2009, CMTA launched its “Culture of Transit” campaign. The first phase is a baseline study of residents’ attitudes and awareness of regional public transportation. A telephone survey and an intercept survey were conducted in March. Eleven focus groups were conducted in Central Maryland in April. A report will be issued during the fall of 2009 and will be used to build a marketing and awareness campaign that promotes greater support for public transportation, which CMTA sees as a key to achieving its objectives.

On Feb. 24, 2009, CMTA sponsored the second annual Regional Transit Oriented Development Summit at the University of Baltimore where Baltimore County Executive Jim Smith and others emphasized the economic and environmental benefits successful TODs could bring to the region. CMTA also has retained Reconnecting America, a national transportation and community development organization, to identify TOD opportunities and challenges in Central Maryland as a means to advance TOD initiatives in the region.

Throughout 2009 CMTA intends to work on expanding the use of car-sharing in Greater Baltimore; conduct a marketing analysis of current and potential transit riders; draft a report detailing the current and potential economic impact of mass transit on the region's economy, and work with MTA to advance a number of system enhancements.

Launched in January 2012, the "Let's Get to Work" campaign advocated for short-to-medium-term improvements to the MARC Commuter Rail system, focusing on the Baltimore-Washington corridor. The initiative aimed to expand train service and regional station access to support employment centers. Following the introduction of MARC weekend service, 2014 campaign priorities included expanding evening service options, enhancing connecting bus routes at stations, and improving last-mile transit connections to job sites.
