= The Nevermore Haunt =

Annual event in Baltimore, Maryland, US

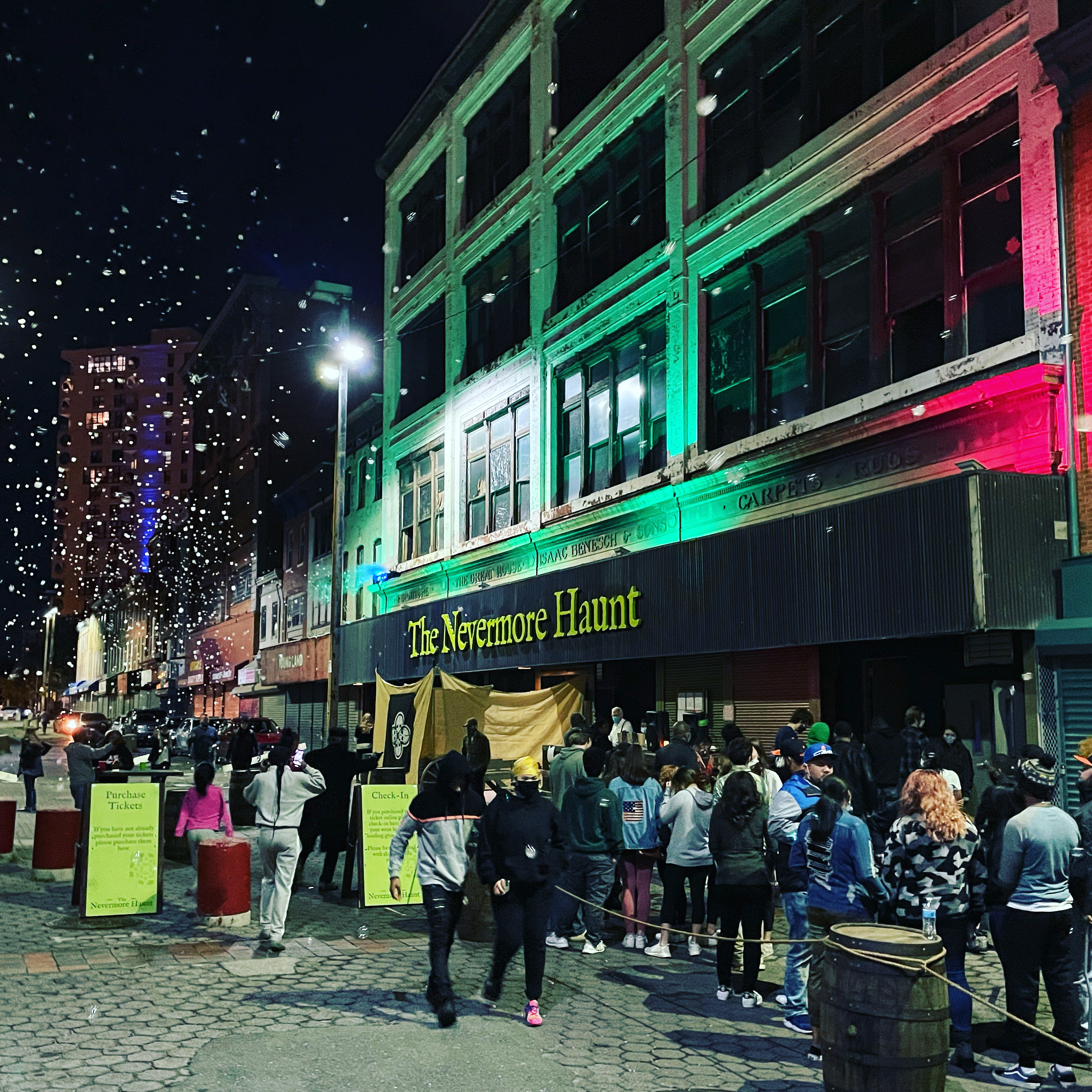
The Nevermore Haunt, October 2023

The Nevermore Haunt is a seasonal haunted attraction located in Baltimore, Maryland. The haunted attraction is located in the historic Old Town Mall in East Baltimore in the former Isaac Benesch & Sons department store, built in the late 19th century The event features sideshow entertainment like magicians and freakshow performers. The haunted house has opened annually since 2016.

The Nevermore Haunt is an historically themed event that takes inspiration from its location in downtown Baltimore. The event has received positive reviews, cited by Fright Review as the Fright of the Year in 2021

The name of the attraction is a reference to the poem The Raven by Edgar Allan Poe who died and is buried in Baltimore.
