= Hebrew Orphan Asylum (Baltimore, Maryland) =

Former orphanage in Baltimore, USA

- U.S. National Register of Historic Places
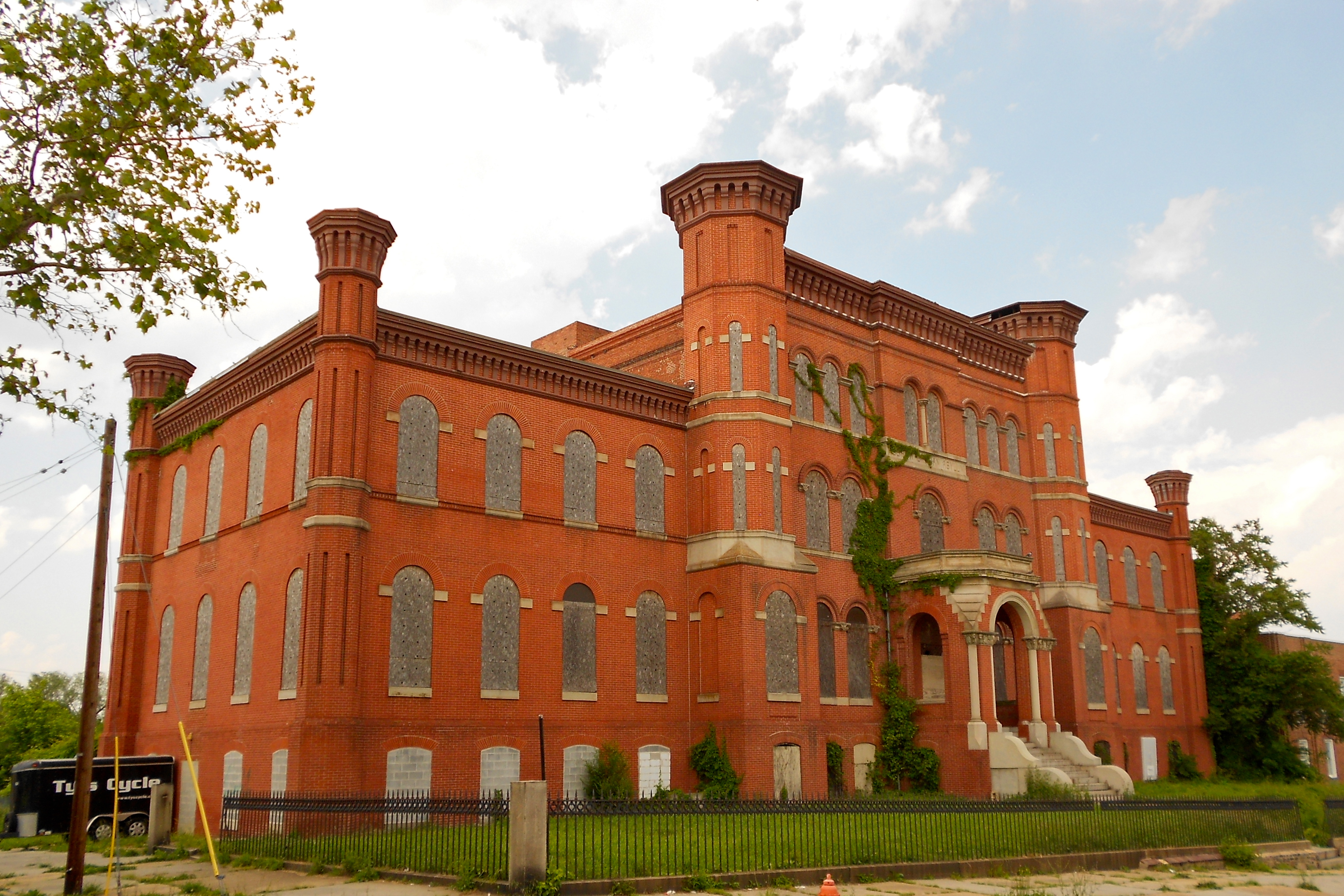

- Location within Baltimore Location within Maryland Location within the United States
- Location: 2700 Rayner Avenue, Baltimore, Maryland
- Coordinates: 39°17′48″N 76°39′44″W
- Area: 1.884 acres (0.762 ha)
- Built: 1876
- Architect: Lupus & Roby
- Architectural style: Victorian Romanesque
- NRHP reference No.: 10000868
- Added to NRHP: October 28, 2010

The Hebrew Orphan Asylum is a historic institutional orphanage and former hospital building located in the Mosher neighborhood of Baltimore, Maryland, United States. It has also been known as West Baltimore General Hospital, Lutheran Hospital of Maryland and is currently being redeveloped by Coppin Heights Community Development Corporation to be a Center for Healthcare & Healthy Living.

Built in 1875, the Hebrew Orphan Asylum in Baltimore, Maryland replaced the old Calverton Mansion (built in 1815) when a fire destroyed the mansion in 1874. The Hebrew Orphan Asylum, which started in 1872 in the Calverton Mansion depended on donations from people within the Baltimore Jewish community, including the wealthy German Jewish community that had settled within the city. The history of the asylum follows the history of the Jewish community in Baltimore, which increased rapidly with immigration from Europe in the 19th and 20th centuries. The building transitioned to serve as the West Baltimore General Hospital from 1923 through 1950 and finally the Lutheran Hospital of Maryland from 1950 to 1989. While associated structures associated with the Hebrew Orphan Asylum, the West Baltimore General Hospital, and the Lutheran Hospital of Maryland were demolished in 2009, the original four-story brick Romanesque structure still stands.

The building is a south-facing Victorian Romanesque red brick structure. Its central block is four stories high and five bays wide, with a large porch and projecting turrets at each corner. The central block is flanked by three-story wings, each four bays wide, on the west and east. The Hebrew Orphan Asylum was designed by Lupus & Roby, the partnership of Edward Lupus (1834–1877) and Henry Albert Roby (1844–1905), and constructed by Edward Brady (1830–1900).

The history of the development at the site of the current building began in 1815 with the construction of "Calverton," the country home of Baltimore banker Dennis Smith. This building was re-purposed and expanded for use as the Baltimore City and County Almshouse from 1820 through 1866. Calverton featured a central mansion for caretakers, large wings on either side for male and female dormitories and a "lunatic" hospital. The Hebrew Orphan Asylum was established in 1872 and operated in the Calverton mansion until displaced by a fire in 1874. After some deliberation, the leaders of the Hebrew Orphan Asylum decided to rebuild at the same location following a design by architects Lupus & Roby.

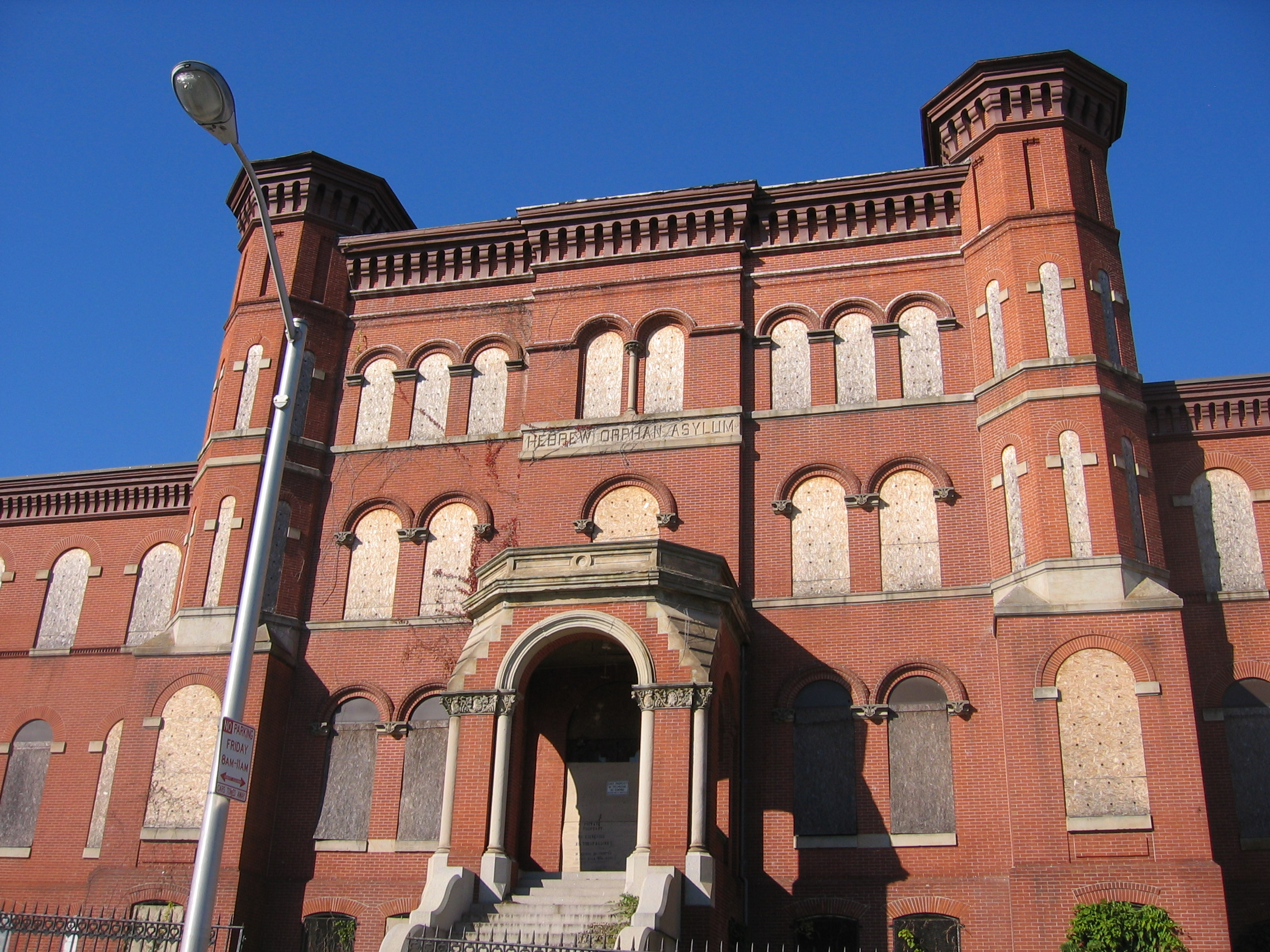
Entrance

The Hebrew Orphan Asylum moved to a new facility in 1923 and the building transitioned to serve as the West Baltimore General Hospital from 1923 through 1950. The facility then became the Lutheran Hospital of Maryland and remained in use from 1950 to 1989. The history of the building as a hospital included the addition of several related structures to the campus only one of which, a 1945 maternity ward, remaining extant. This building, designed by Henry Powell Hopkins and built by the John K. Ruff Company, now operates as the Tuerk House, a residential drug and alcohol rehab facility. The original Hebrew Orphan Asylum building has been vacant since 1989 and has been owned by Coppin State University since 2003.

Baltimore Heritage, a nonprofit historic preservation advocacy organization, nominated the Hebrew Orphan Asylum to the National Register of Historic Places in 2010 in partnership with Coppin Heights Community Development Corporation, a nonprofit CDC originally formed by Coppin State University.

The building was listed on the U.S. National Register of Historic Places on October 28, 2010. The listing was announced as the featured listing in the National Park Service's weekly list of November 5, 2010.
