= Gay Street (Baltimore street) =

Street in Baltimore, Maryland

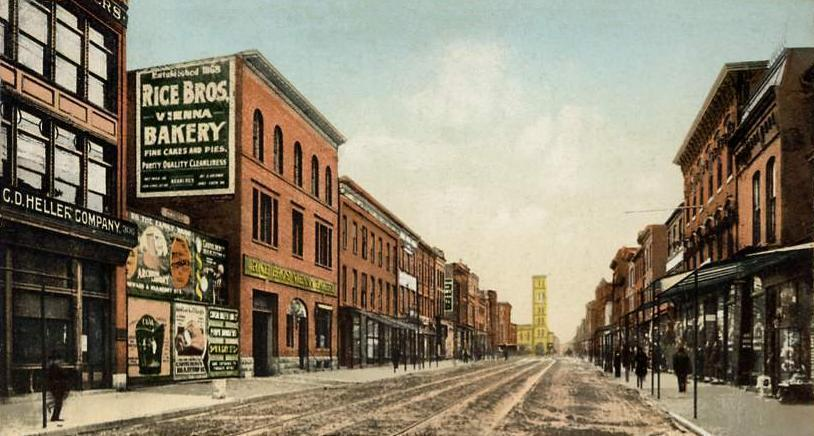
- Gay Street in 1912, looking northeast
- Owner: City of Baltimore
- Location: Baltimore
- Postal code: 21202, 21205, 21213
- North end: North Avenue
- South end: Pratt Street

Gay Street is a street in Baltimore, Maryland that gets its name from Nicholas Ruxton Gay, who surveyed the area in 1747. It begins at the intersection of East Pratt Street near the Baltimore World Trade Center (at the Inner Harbor) and proceeds north and east through Baltimore until it crosses Orleans Street (U.S. Route 40) and becomes Ensor Street. According to the Baltimore City web site, the Gay Street corridor escaped the Great Baltimore Fire in 1904.

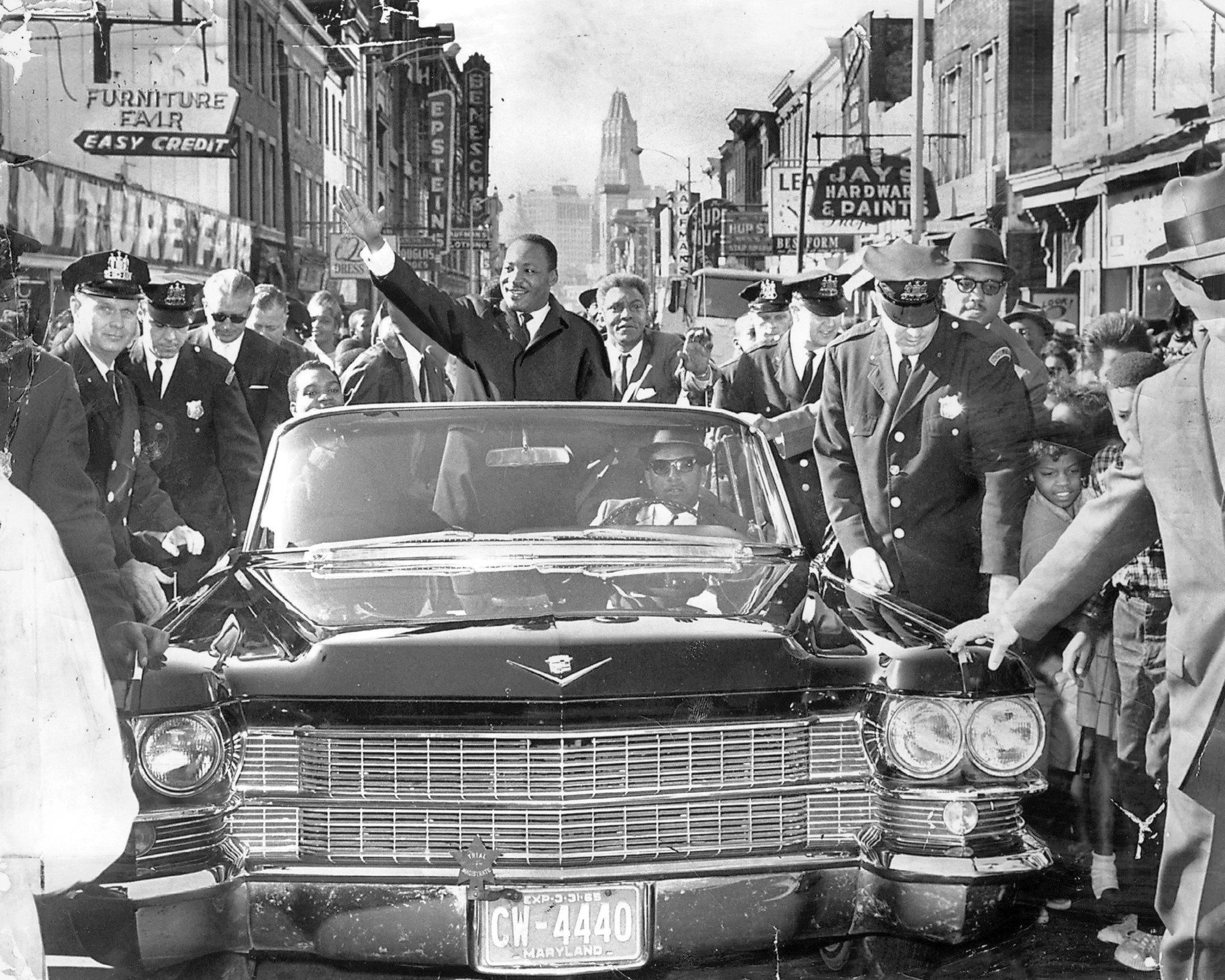
The Rev. Dr. Martin Luther King Jr. on the street after winning the 1964 Nobel Peace Prize

Urban development in the 1970s essentially cut Gay Street in half in east Baltimore. Old Town Mall, a retail strip that spans from Orleans to Aisquith and Monument Streets, was converted from a working street to a pedestrian mall. The street from that point north to Chase Street was essentially paved over, and the land was fitted into the surrounding street grid. Despite the rebuild, there are still a few housing units in the area that still follow the angular path that Gay Street cut through the neighborhood. Just north of Monument Street next to the Cain athletic field, there is a well-worn pedestrian path that follows the old route of Gay Street in defiance of the grass and meandering concrete sidewalk that borders the park.

Gay Street continues north from Chase, is briefly cut by the recently rebuilt (2000s) median of Broadway, then continues up to (and ends at) North Avenue, also known as U.S. Route 1 and U.S. Route 40 Truck through Baltimore city.
