= Mosher, Baltimore =

Neighborhood in Baltimore, Maryland, US

Coordinates: 39°17′51″N 76°39′45.5″W

Mosher is a neighborhood in the western part of Baltimore, Maryland. Its boundaries are the north side of Edmondson Avenue, the west side of Braddish Avenue, the east side of Poplar Grove, and the south side of Riggs Avenue. The neighborhood lies in the vicinity of Walbrook Junction, Coppin State University, Sandtown-Winchester, and Edmondson Village. Mosher is one of several neighborhoods that resisted the development of the "Road to Nowhere", now designated as US 40, along the Franklin Avenue corridor. The area was historically segregated, and largely occupied by European Americans, but transitioned during the early 1950s to become a predominantly African American area.

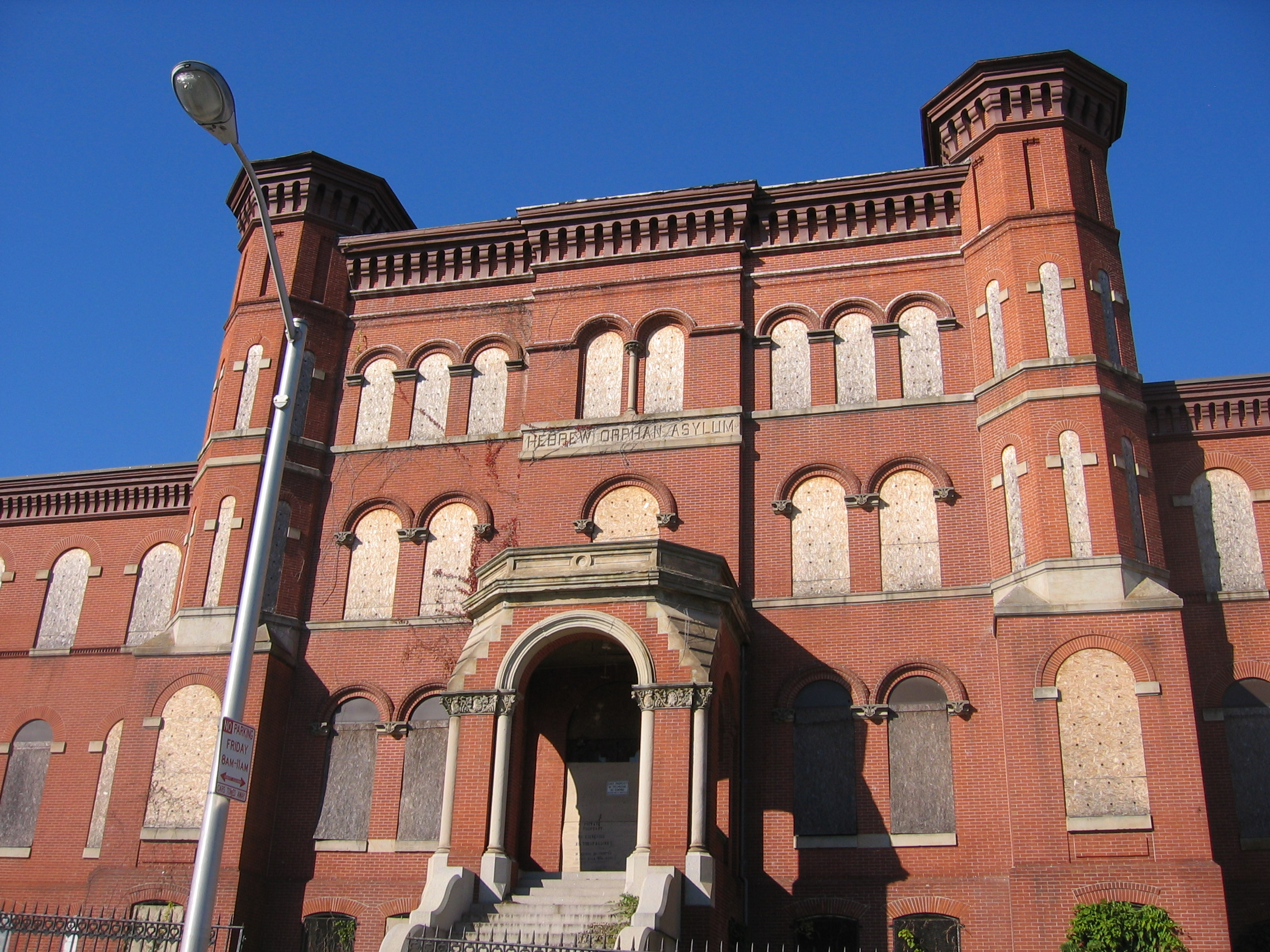
Hebrew Orphan Asylum, Baltimore

One of the most significant buildings remaining the early development of Mosher is the Hebrew Orphan Asylum. This 1876 Richardsonian Romanesque building became the West Baltimore General Hospital in 1923, then in 1945 became the Lutheran Hospital of Maryland. The hospital closed in 1989 and in 2003 the building was purchased by Coppin State University. In 2014, it was sold to the Coppin Heights Community Development Corporation and offers healthcare services to local residents.

The population neighborhood is predominantly African American and significantly low-income. According to 2000 Census data, 99% of Mosher households identify as African-American, .5% identifying as Asian, and .2% each identifying as white, American Indian and Alaska Native, or two or more races. The median household income was $24,667. Resident organizations in Mosher include the La Burt Improvement Association, Lafayette Community Association, Mosher Ridge Improvement Association, and Nehemiah House Community Association.

== See also ==
- Baltimore neighborhoods
