= Edward Lupus =

American architect (1834–1877)

Edward Lupus (1834–1877) was a German-born American architect. Born in 1834 in the Grand Duchy of Hesse, he arrived in Baltimore at age 19 on November 8, 1853, from Bremen. At the time of his immigration to the United States, he reported his profession as a joiner. By 1860, Edward Lupus had married and lived at 16 West Baltimore Street with his wife, Sophia Lupus, their children, Rudolph and Charles, as well as an older Rudolph Lupus, a watchmaker and likely relative of Edward, and Rudolph's wife, Louisa Lupus. The two continued to share both residences and offices throughout the 1860s.

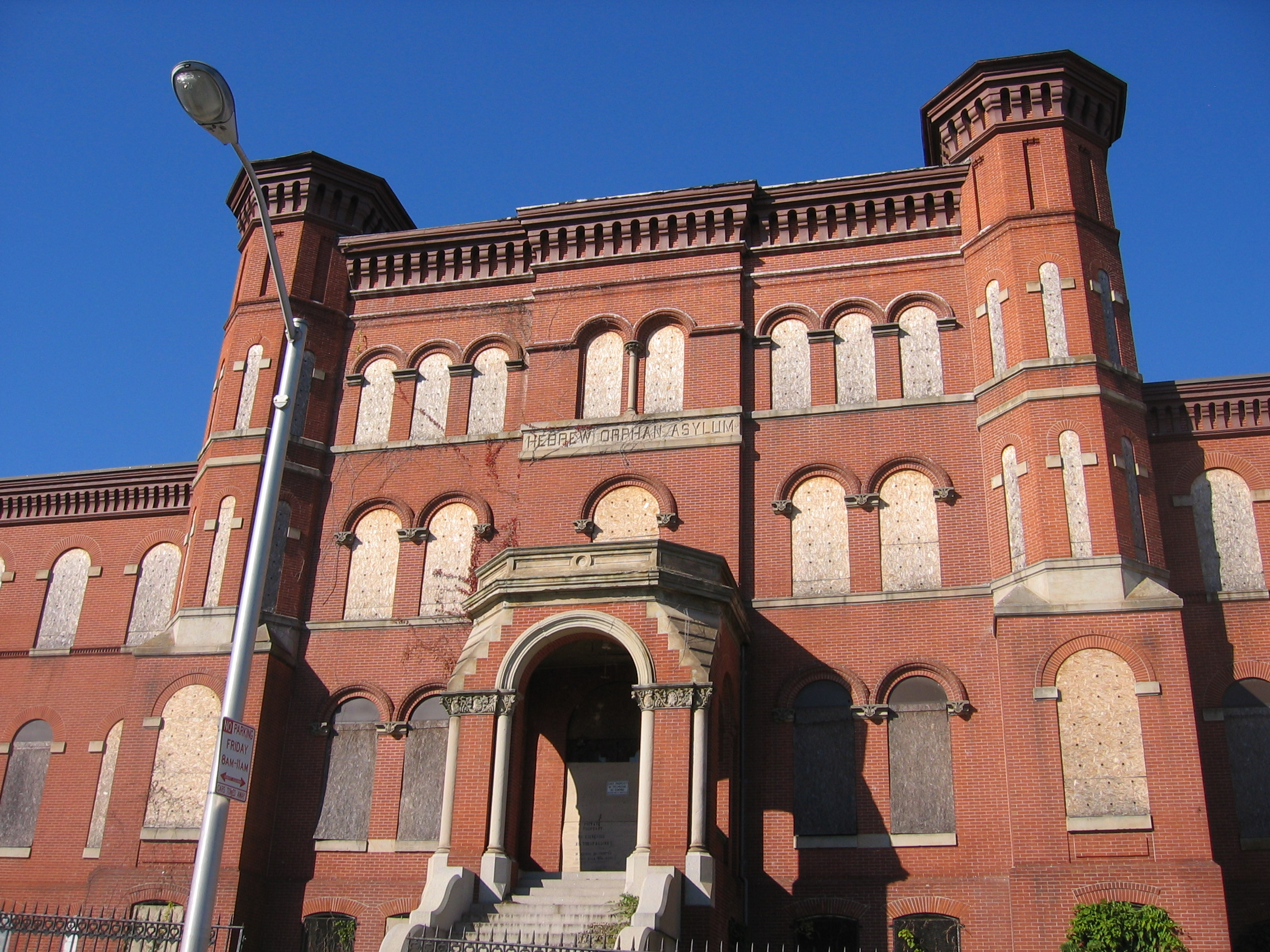
Hebrew Orphan Asylum, Baltimore

1870 is the first year Lupus is identified as an architect, both in the city directory and census. Lupus and Henry Albert Roby began their partnership in 1871. One of their earliest projects was a shooting range and bowling alley for the Schuetzen Park on Belair Road near the then Baltimore City limits, following work Lupus had done at the park in 1866. The Schuetzen Association included 800 members from first- and second-generation German families. The pair continued to work primarily within the German community, designing the Baltimore General German Orphan Asylum at Orleans and Aisquith Streets in 1873 and the Hebrew Orphan Asylum in 1874.

Edward Lupus died at his home in Sextonville, Baltimore County on February 13, 1877, at the age of 43 following a three-month illness. The projects identified in his obituary included the Germania Clubhouse (1874) on West Fayette Street near North Eutaw Street, St. Matthews’ German Lutheran Church (1873) on Fayette Street between Central and Eden Streets, the House of the Good Shepherd, the “villa of Gen Meem, Va.,” and the Virginia House at the Orkney Spring Hotel (1873) on Route 263 in Orkney Springs, Virginia.
