= Old Town Mall =

Dead mall in Baltimore, Maryland, U.S.

- Oldtown Mall
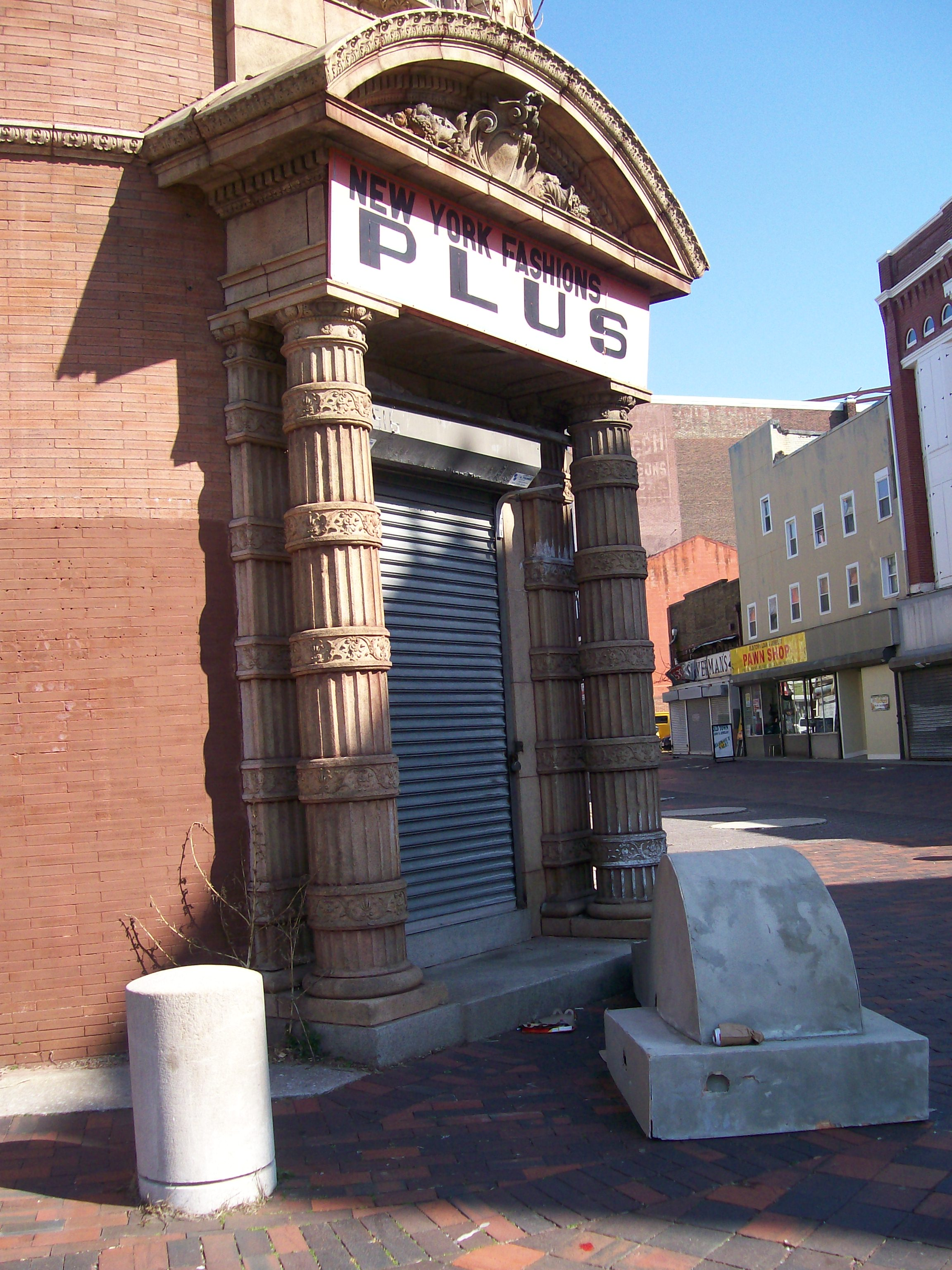
- An abandoned storefront with the mall in the background
- Location: Baltimore, Maryland
- Coordinates: 39.2963°N 76.6038°W
- Address: 500 N. Gay Street, Baltimore, MD 21202
- Opened: 1818; 208 years ago (stores open), 1968; 58 years ago (the mall itself opened)
- Num. of stores: 64
- Num. of anchor tenants: 1 (closed)
- Public transit: Johns Hopkins Hospital, Shot Tower/Market Place, Metro SubwayLink

The Old Town Mall or Oldtown Mall is a mostly abandoned outdoor pedestrian shopping mall in the Old Town neighborhood of Baltimore, Maryland. The mall contains 64 stores, the majority of which are closed. The area has seen many periods of revival and decline in the past 200 years since its opening. The area is currently under redevelopment as part of the Perkins, Somerset Oldtown (PSO) Transformation Plan. The redevelopment is being competed with funding from the Department of Housing and Urban Development in partnership with the Housing Authority of Baltimore City.

== History ==
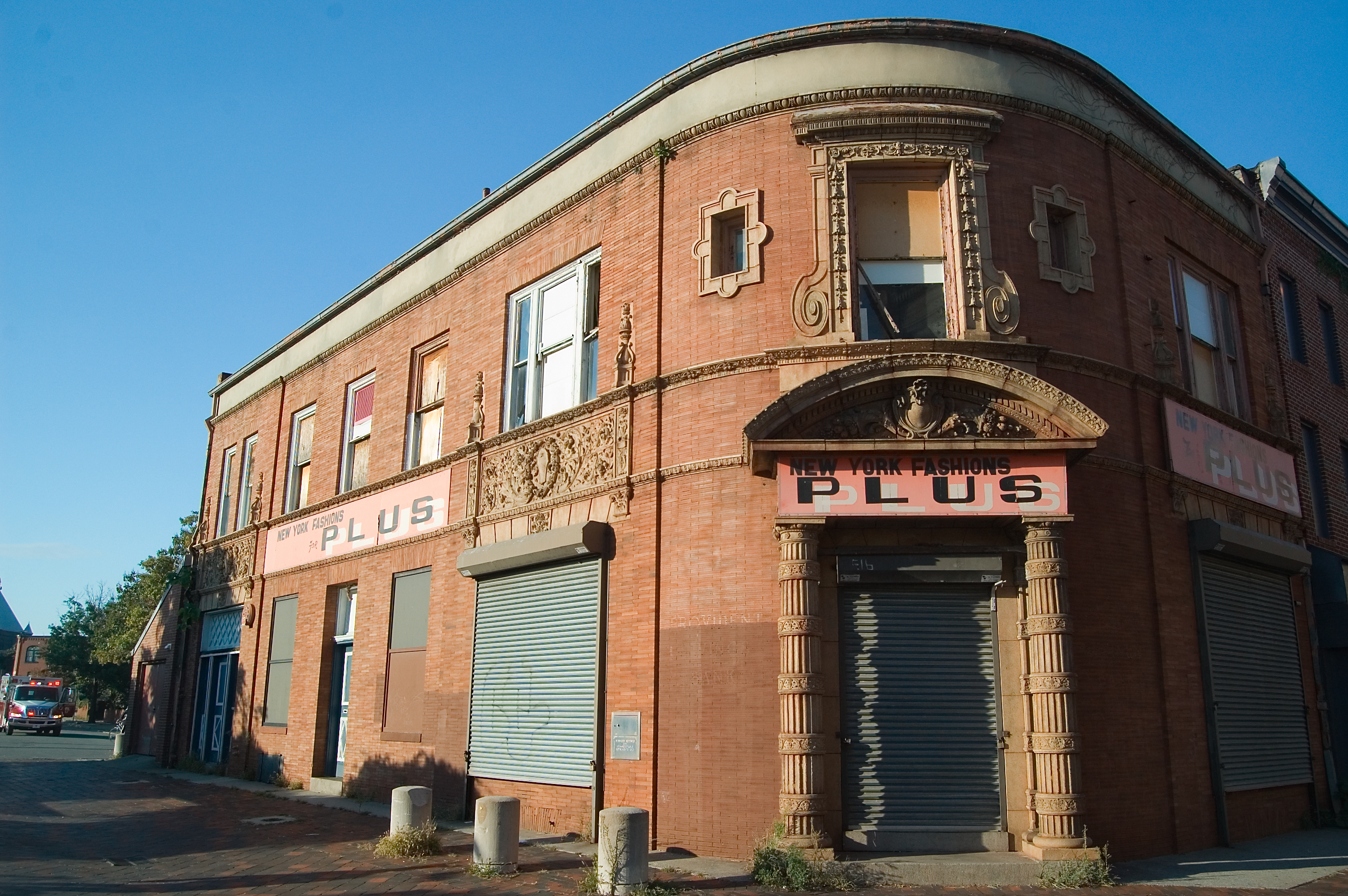
The closed "New York Fashions PLUS" store

Old Town and Gay Street started to become a retail area when the City of Baltimore built the Bel Air Market in 1818. The sixth market to be constructed, Bel Air was designed to be a relief farmers market to serve the increasing commercial operations surrounding the area. The market helped boost business in Old Town, and the area became a diverse, bustling middle-class neighborhood, and the proximity to the city center made it an ideal place for families and downtown workers to live. Isaac Benesch's Great Store was here. But, when the post-war era beckoned families to the suburbs, Gay Street suffered greatly. The population near the street fell, and Old Town became one of the poorer areas of the city. Without its customer base, the shops on the street were forced to close or adapt to the new customer demographic.

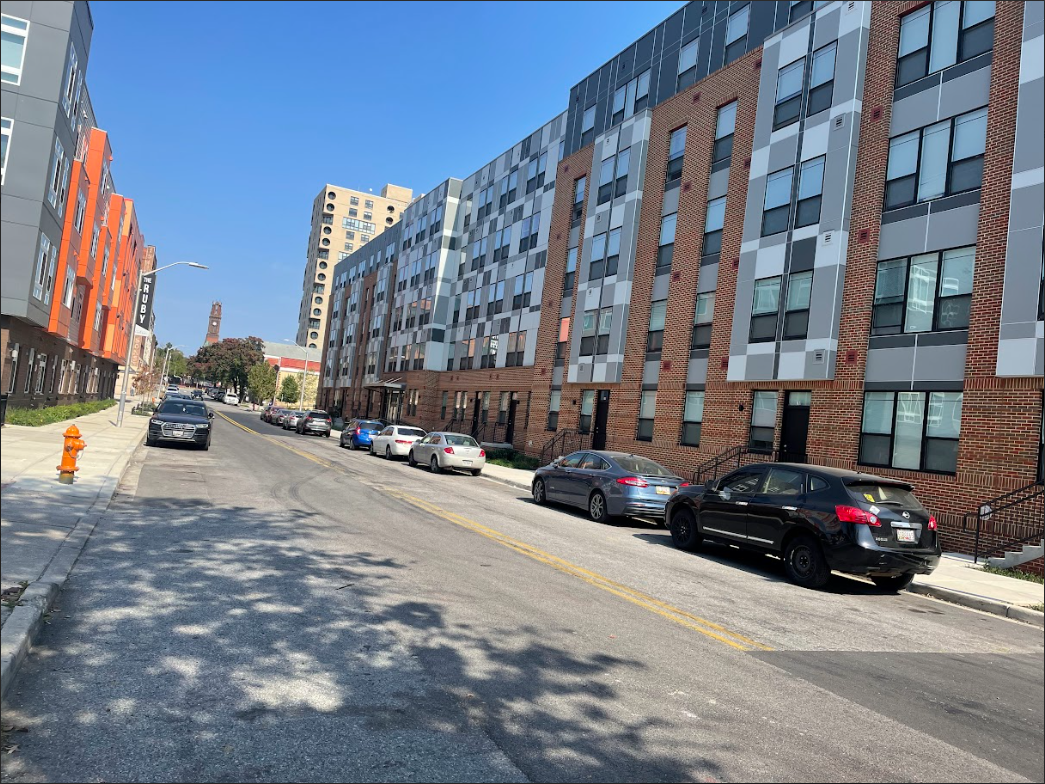
Brand New Apartments in Old Town, July 2025

=== Redevelopment ===
The Baltimore riot of 1968 was a turning point in the area. The City of Baltimore used the devastation as a way to revitalize Gay Street. Developers decided to convert the street into a pedestrian-only zone and name it the Old Town Mall. The street was repaved with bricks; planters, street lamps, and trees were added; and even a fountain was installed in the center along with a clock tower that would bear the name of the mall. More than $1.7 million had been spent on the project. In the late 1960s, the area opened with "much fanfare". Government officials from across the country were in attendance. One newspaper wrote that "Good things are happening in Old Town".

By the 1980s, the area had already started resembling what it looked like before the revitalization, due to the fact that the city didn't remedy the high unemployment and poverty in Old Town. A few unsuccessful attempts were made to bring life back to the area, one involved tearing down the Bel Air Market to build a parking lot in hopes that a major grocery store chain would build a location at the mall. Developers in 2023 announced plans to bring a Lidl grocery store to the area near the old market.

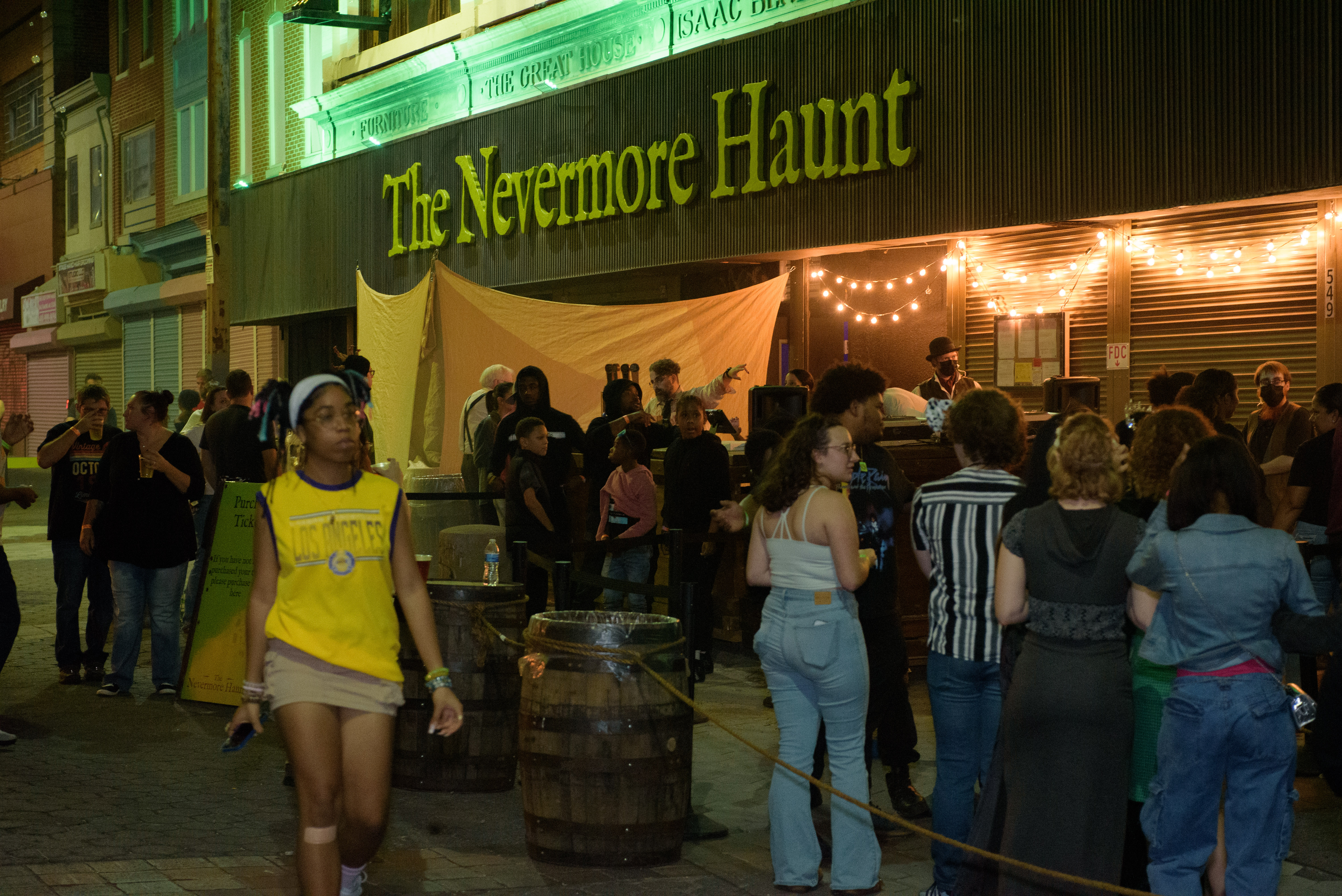
A crowd outside The Nevermore Haunt, in Old Town Mall October 2023

The mall once contained a 40,000-square-foot (3,700 m^{2}) Kaufman's department store in the former Benesch building, the only anchor. Today, The Nevermore Haunt, a seasonal Halloween attraction operates from this building each October since 2015. Starting in 2016, developers from the Baltimore area emerged with plans to restore the area, capitalizing on the proximity to Johns Hopkins Hospital. Plans include redesigns of the 500 block of Old Town Mall to include one-way through traffic and new amenities the mall to business opportunities. The redeveloped site includes new housing, office, and commercial space, a new park, hotel and an updated community center.
