= Old Town, Baltimore =

Old Town
- Neighborhood of Baltimore
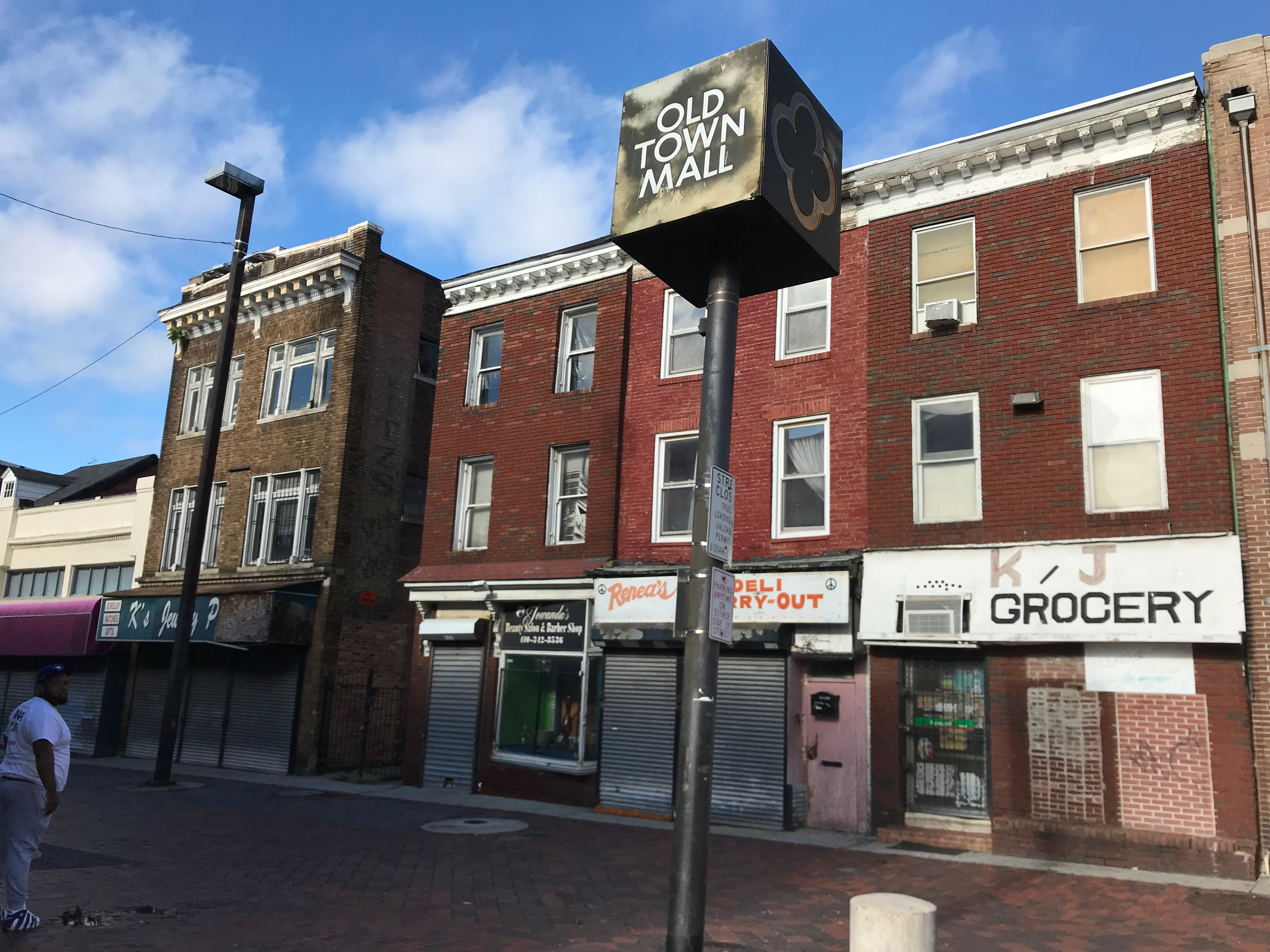
- Commercial buildings along Old Town Mall (500 block of Gay Street) in Oldtown, Baltimore

- Location within Baltimore
- Coordinates: 39°17′41″N 76°36′25″W
- Country: United States
- State: Maryland
- City: Baltimore

Area
  - Land: .0308 sq mi (0.080 km^{2})

Population (2010)
  - Total: 8,683
- ZIP code: 21202

Old Town is an area of East Baltimore, Maryland, mostly in zip code 21202, bounded roughly by the Jones Falls Expressway (JFX) on the west, Orleans Street to the south, Caroline Street to the east and Monument Street to the north. One of the area's main features is the Old Town Mall.

The Baltimore riot of 1968 occurred here. The area was completely rebuilt in the mid-1970s, but has deteriorated since.

== See also ==
- List of Baltimore neighborhoods
