= Sydenham Hospital for Communicable Diseases =

Historic Place in Maryland, United States

Geography
- Location: Baltimore, Maryland, United States

Organization
- Type: Specialist

Services
- Speciality: Communicable diseases

History
- Demolished: 2013

Links
- Lists: Hospitals in Maryland
- Sydenham Hospital for Communicable Diseases
- U.S. National Register of Historic Places
- U.S. Historic district
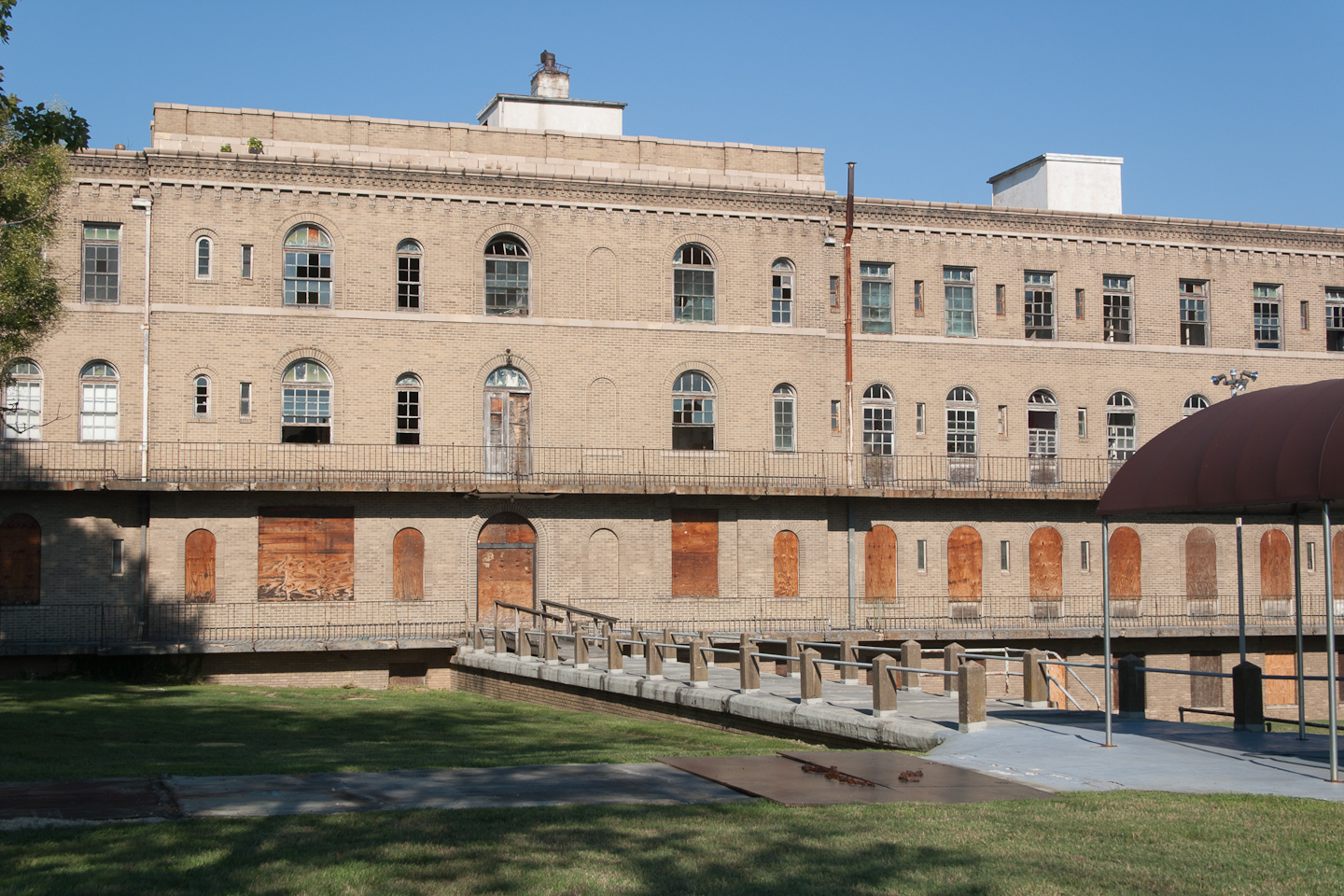
- Main hospital building, August 2011.

- Location within Baltimore Location within Maryland Location within the United States
- Location: Argonne Dr., W. of Herring Rd., Baltimore, Maryland
- Coordinates: 39°20′16″N 76°34′52″W
- Area: 10 acres (4.0 ha)
- Built: 1924
- Architects: Edward Hughes Glidden, Sr.
- Architectural style: Italian Renaissance Revival
- NRHP reference No.: 98001294
- Added to NRHP: October 30, 1998

Sydenham Hospital for Communicable Diseases, also known as Montebello State Hospital or Montebello State Chronic Disease Hospital, was a hospital Baltimore, Maryland, that is now listed on the National Register of Historic Places. It was originally constructed in 1922–1924, and the campus consists of seven Italian Renaissance Revival style buildings: the main hospital building, the administration building, the kitchen, the nurses’ home, the laundry with servants’ quarters above, the garage, and the powerhouse. A residence for the Director of Medical Research was added in 1939. The campus was designed by noted Baltimore architect Edward Hughes Glidden.

It was added to the National Register of Historic Places in 1998.

The patient records of Sydenham Hospital are held at the National Library of Medicine and showcase nature and treatment of communicable diseases in the pre-antibiotic era.

The main hospital building was demolished in 2013 and an empty lot now sits in its place.
