= Southern Management Companies =

American property management company

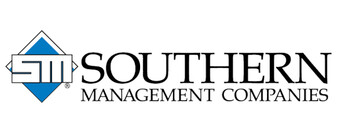
- Formerly: Central Management
- Type: Private
- Industry: Property management
- Founded: 1965; 61 years ago in Vienna, Virginia, United States
- Founders: David Hillman
- Headquarters: McLean, Virginia, United States
- Key people: Suzanne D. Hillman, CEO Gabrielle Duvall, President
- Website: www.southernmanagement.com

Southern Management Companies is a privately owned property management company in the Mid-Atlantic United States.

The company owns more than 25,000 apartment units across 76 properties, three hotels, and 1 million square feet in commercial space in the Baltimore/DC area and a ski resort, hotel, and conference center, Bear Creek, in Macungie, Pennsylvania.

== History ==
The company (originally Central Management) was founded by David Hillman in 1965, when he purchased his first multifamily community, Lakeside North, in Prince George's County, Maryland. The corporate headquarters is located in Vienna, Virginia, with a secondary corporate office located in College Park, Maryland.

While the company is primarily known for acquiring existing apartment communities, they have also been involved in development projects such as The Hotel at the University of Maryland located in College Park, Maryland and the Arundel, an apartment community located in Hanover, Maryland, both of which opened in 2017. In 2018, they built and franchised the Cambria Hotel in College park. They have also completed several rehabs of historic buildings in downtown Baltimore such as the Standard Oil Building (The Standard at Preston Gardens), The Baltimore Gas and Electric Company Building (39 West Lexington), and The Atrium.

In 2016, Southern Management received recognition from the Malcolm Baldrige National Quality Award for Performance Excellence for their best practices in the workforce category.

In December 2017, David Hillman nominated his wife, Suzanne Hillman, CEO of Southern Management. Suzanne was hired in 1975 as an accountant for Southern Management and later took on additional roles. Prior to her change in title, she had been an officer and CFO of the company for over thirty years.

== Southern Management Leadership Program ==
The Southern Management Leadership Program (formerly the Hillman Entrepreneurs Program) serves to develop local community leaders through a scholarship and intensive mentoring program at Prince George's Community College, Montgomery College and the University of Maryland, College Park.
