= Eutaw–Madison Apartment House Historic District =

Historic district in Maryland, United States

- U.S. National Register of Historic Places
- U.S. Historic district
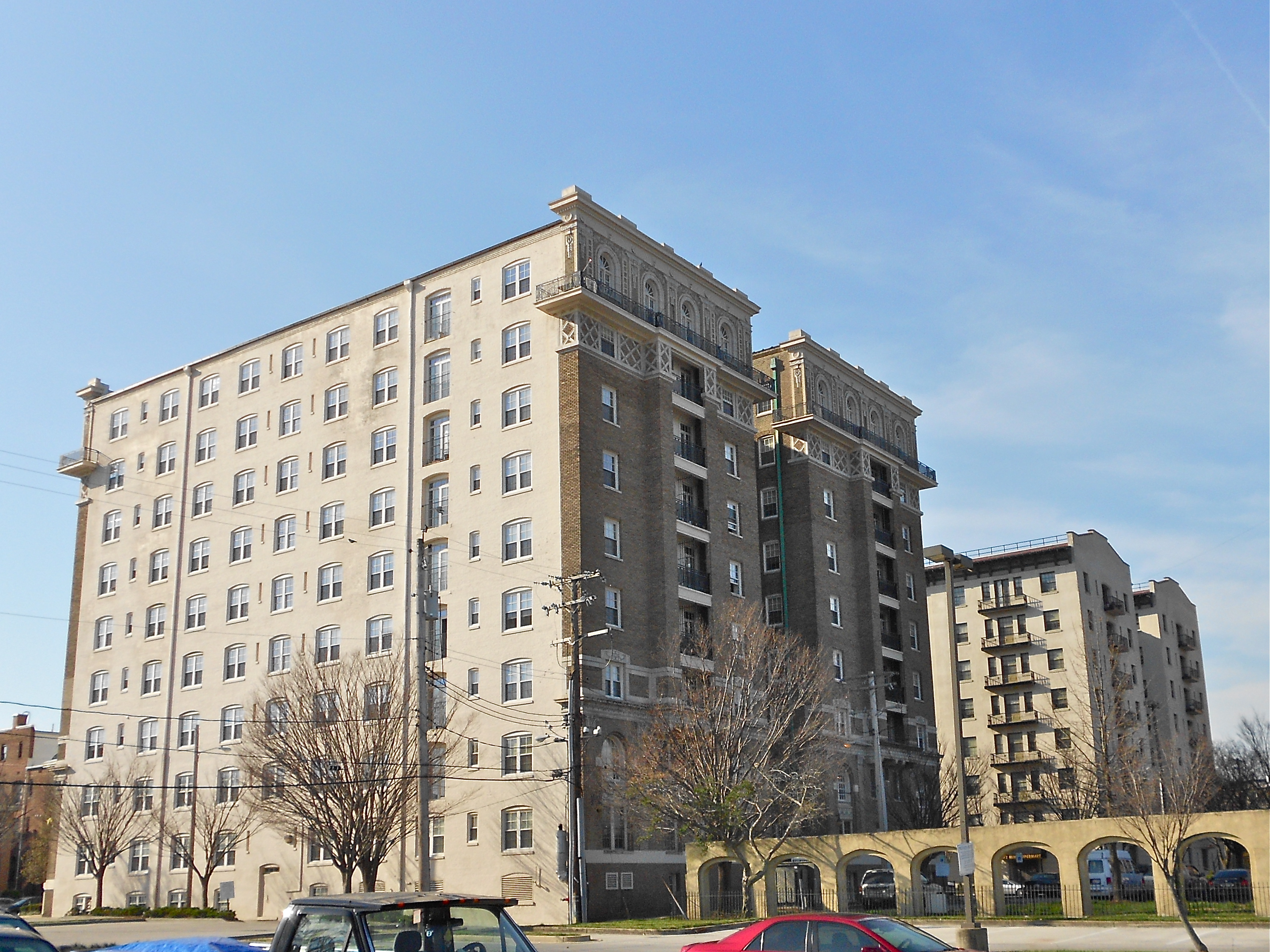
- Eutaw–Madison Apartment House Historic District, March 2012

- Location within Baltimore Location within Maryland Location within the United States
- Location: 2502 and 2525 Eutaw Pl., and 2601 Madison Ave., Baltimore, Maryland
- Coordinates: 39°18′55″N 76°38′18″W
- Area: 3 acres (1.2 ha)
- Architect: Multiple
- Architectural style: Mixed (more Than 2 Styles From Different Periods)
- NRHP reference No.: 83002931
- Added to NRHP: May 12, 1983

Eutaw–Madison Apartment House Historic District is a national historic district in Baltimore, Maryland, United States. It consists of a group of three multi-story apartment buildings built in the first quarter of the 20th century. They are: The Esplanade, a 9-story apartment building built in 1912; the Emersonian, an 8-story building constructed in 1915 of stuccoed masonry; and Temple Gardens, a 14-story building built in 1926. The district is significant in part because of its association with Baltimore's Jewish community. During the 19th century, the Eutaw–Madison neighborhood became a center for the Jewish community in Baltimore. By the 1920s the neighborhood had been established firmly as a neighborhood of middle and upper-class Jews, many of whom were professionals and merchants.

It was added to the National Register of Historic Places in 1983.
