= Henry Albert Roby =

- Born: March 1844; Massachusetts, U.S.
- Died: June 3, 1905 (aged 61); Baltimore, Maryland, U.S.
- Spouse: Lucia Maria Roby
- Military career
- Nicknames: Harry Albert Roby; H.A. Roby
- Unit: 1st Maryland Regiment
- Conflicts: American Civil War: Battle of Gettysburg

Henry Albert Roby (March 1844 – June 3, 1905), also known as Harry A. Roby, was an American architect and military officer. He was an early architect in Pennsylvania and Maryland.

== Life and career ==
Henry Albert Roby was born March 1844, in Massachusetts. He joined the 1st Maryland Regiment of the Confederate Army at age 18, fighting in the Battle of Gettysburg and serving through the end of the Civil War.

Roby began work as a draftsman in 1868 at 891 Park Avenue, Baltimore, Maryland, his mother's home since at least 1865. By 1870, Roby is identified in directories as an architect with an office at 155 Park Avenue, Baltimore and in 1871 Edward Lupus and Roby began a partnership that would continue for six years, up until Lupus’ death in 1877. Roby continued to work as an architect in Baltimore through at least 1880, moving his office from 49 Lexington Street to 49 St. Paul Street in 1879 while residing at 197 Park Avenue.

During the 1890s, Roby resided in Lebanon, Pennsylvania, where he had a second short-lived partnership, Roby & Richter, with Abner A. Richter of Reading, Pennsylvania. A rare example of Roby's later work is the 1896 St. Katharine's Church at East Lancaster Avenue & North Aberdeen Avenue in Wayne, Pennsylvania. By 1900, Roby had returned to Baltimore where he lived at 891 Park Avenue, with his mother, Mary C. Roby, wife, Lucia M. Roby, their daughter, and a servant.

Near the end of his career, Roby remained active in the Baltimore Catholic community, Confederate veteran organizations, and composed several patriotic poems before his death on June 3, 1905, at his residence on Park Avenue.
