= List of church buildings in Baltimore =

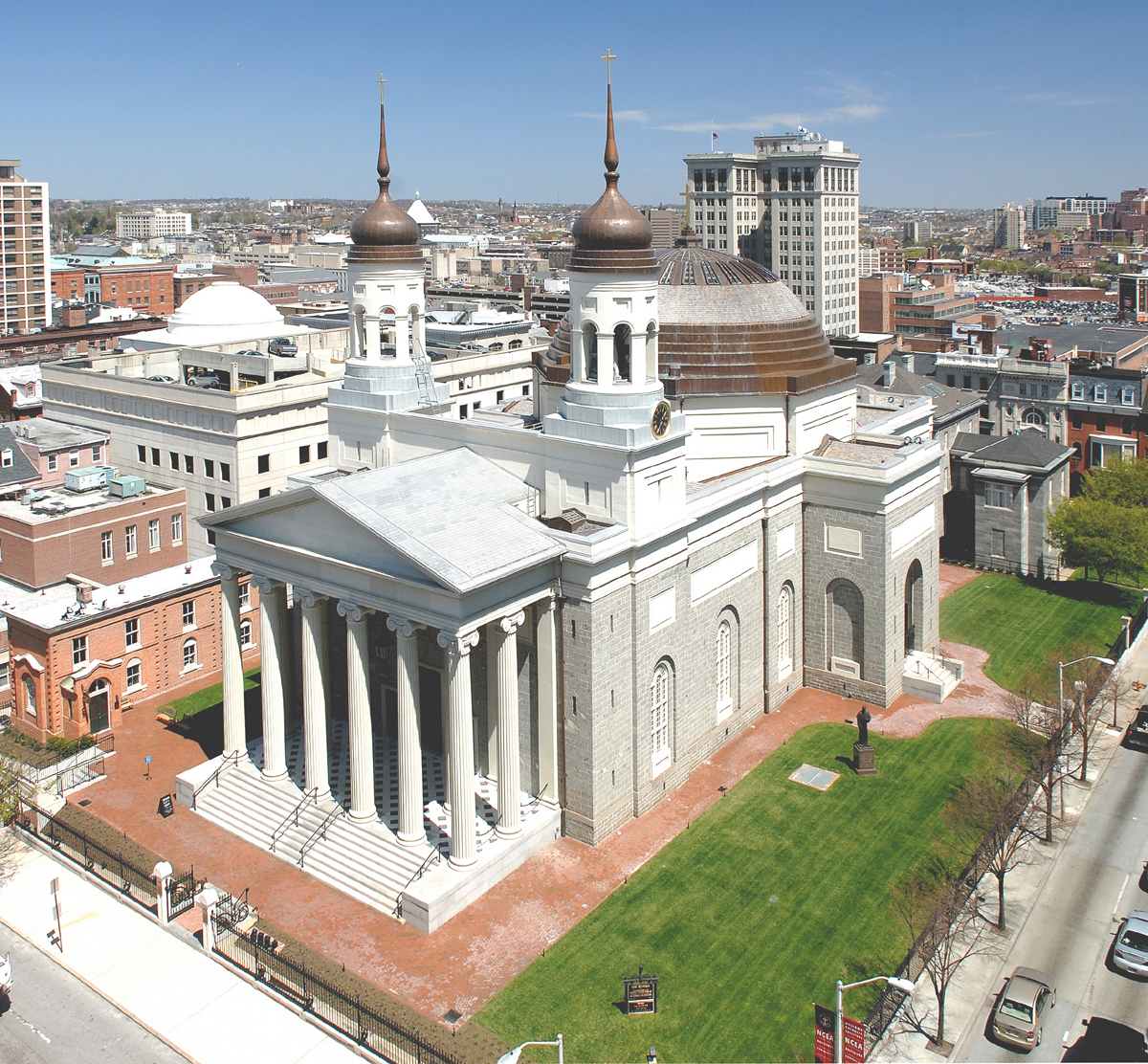
Basilica of the National Shrine of the Assumption of the Blessed Virgin Mary

The churches of Baltimore are numerous and diverse. Baltimore has many historic and significant churches, as well as many smaller and newer ones.

== African Methodist Episcopal Church ==
Church
Bethel A.M.E. Church

== Apostolic ==
Church
Bethel United Church of Jesus Christ, Apostolic
Hour of Prayer Apostolic
Mt. Airy Apostolic

== Baptist ==
Church
Leadenhall Street Baptist Church
Union Baptist Church

== Christian Science ==
Church
First Church of Christ, Scientist
Second Church of Christ, Scientist

== Episcopal ==
See the Episcopal Diocese of Maryland.

Church
Cathedral of the Incarnation
Church of St. Michael & All Angels
Church of the Advent
Church of the Redemption
Emmanuel Episcopal Church
Grace & St. Peter's Church
Memorial Episcopal Church
St. James Episcopal Church
St. John's Episcopal Church
St. Luke's Church
St. Paul's Episcopal Church

== Friends (Quaker) ==
Church
Old Town Friends' Meetinghouse
Stony Run Friends
Homewood Friends

== Black Hebrew Israelite ==
Church
Israelite Church of God in Jesus Christ, Maryland

== Evangelical Lutheran ==
Church
Christ Lutheran Church
Messiah Lutheran Church
Zion Lutheran Church, also known by its historic title of "Zion Church of the City of Baltimore"

== Mennonite ==
Church
North Baltimore Mennonite Church
Wilkens Avenue Mennonite Church

== Methodist ==
=== Methodist Episcopal ===
Church
Grace-Hampden Methodist Episcopal Church
Madison Avenue Methodist Episcopal Church

=== United Methodist ===
Church
Dorguth Memorial United Methodist Church
First United Methodist Church
Lovely Lane Methodist Church
Mount Vernon Place United Methodist Church and Asbury House
Orchard Street United Methodist Church
Sharp Street Memorial United Methodist Church and Community House

== Orthodox Church ==
=== Greek Orthodox ===
Church
Greek Orthodox Cathedral of the Annunciation
St. Nicholas Greek Orthodox Church of Baltimore

=== Orthodox Church in America (OCA) ===
Jurisdiction: Diocese of Washington

Church
Saint Andrew Orthodox Church

=== Russian Orthodox ===
Jurisdiction: Russian Orthodox Church in the USA

Church
Holy Trinity Russian Orthodox Church
Transfiguration of our Lord Russian Orthodox Church

== Pentecostal ==
Church
New Generation Pentecostal Church
The Full Gospel True Mission Church
New Solid Rock Fellowship Church

== Presbyterian ==
Church
Harris Creek Community Church
Brown Memorial Presbyterian Church
First Presbyterian Church and Manse
Franklin Street Presbyterian Church and Parsonage
Westminster Hall and Burying Ground

== Reformed Episcopal ==
Church
Cummins Memorial Church (former)

== Roman Catholic ==
Church
Basilica of the National Shrine of the Assumption of the Blessed Virgin Mary
Holy Cross Roman Catholic Church
St. Alphonsus' Church, Rectory, Convent and Halle
St. Elizabeth of Hungary
St. James the Less Roman Catholic Church
St. John the Evangelist Roman Catholic Church
St. Leo's Church
St. Mary, Star of the Sea
St. Mary's Seminary Chapel
St. Michael's Church Complex
St. Vincent de Paul Church
St. Wenceslaus in Baltimore

== Ukrainian Catholic ==
Church
St. Michael the Archangel Ukrainian Catholic Church
Sts. Peter & Paul Ukrainian Catholic Church

== Unitarian ==
Church
First Unitarian Church

== United Brethren ==
Church
Otterbein Church
