= Christ United Church of Christ =

Coordinates: 39.2723294°N 76.5935772°W

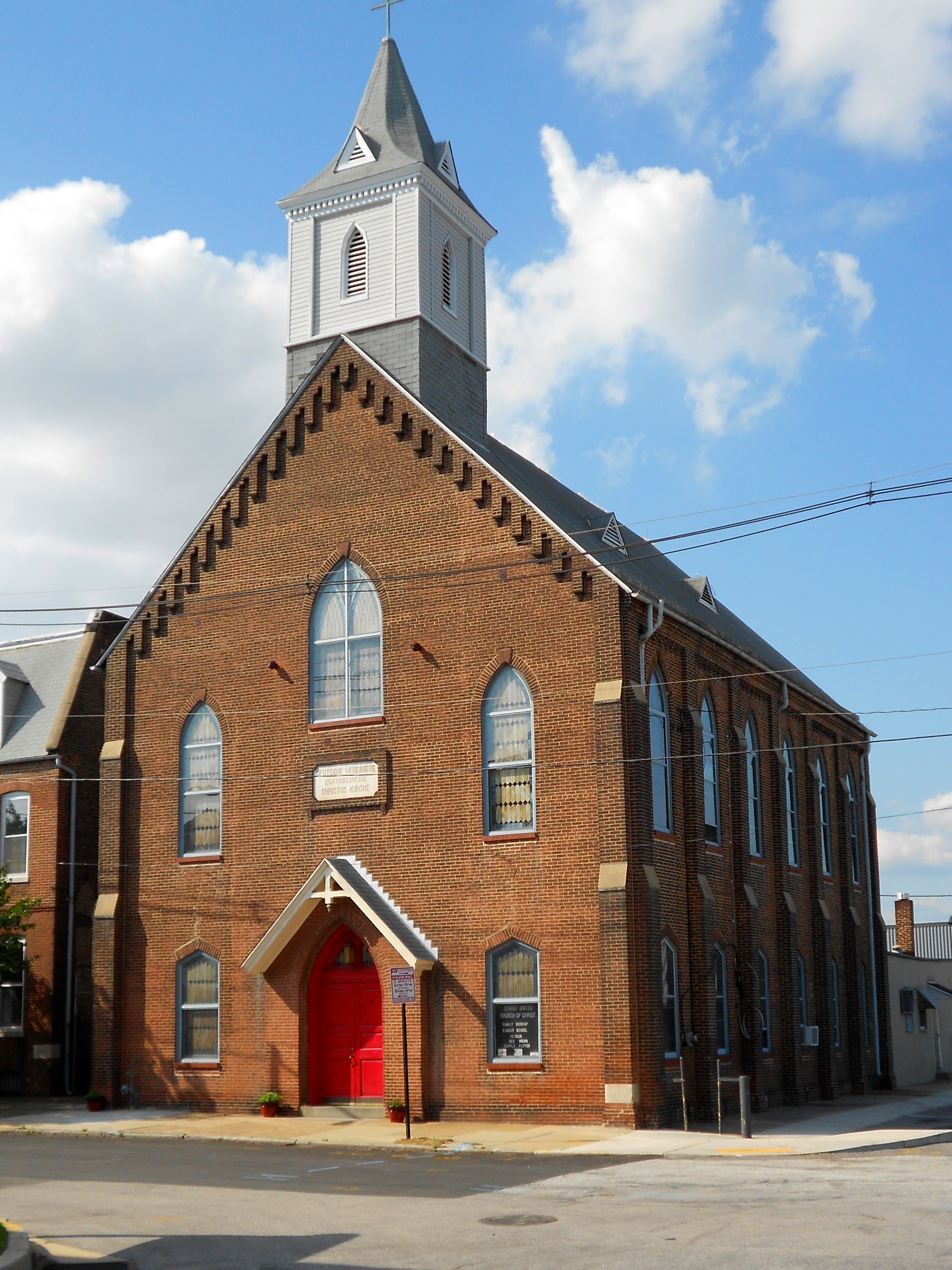

- Location: Baltimore
- Country: United States
- Denomination: United Church of Christ, formerly German Reformed

History
- Founded: 1886
- Founder: German immigrants
- Dedicated: June 9, 1888

Architecture
- Functional status: Active
- Heritage designation: For German immigrants
- Architect: M.F. Decker
- Architectural type: Church
- Groundbreaking: 1886
- Completed: 1886

Specifications
- Materials: Granite

Christ United Church of Christ, also known as The Little German Church, is a United Church of Christ church located in Baltimore, Maryland. It was formerly a German Reformed church.

== History ==
Christ United Church was founded in 1886 as the "Vereinigte Evangelische Christus Gemeinde" (United Evangelical Community Church of Christ). It was founded by German immigrants and was originally affiliated with the Reformed Church in the United States. The church was officially dedicated on June 9, 1888. Prior to 1910, all church services were held in the German language; since then the services have been offered in both German and English.

The congregation opened "The Evangelical Immigrant and Seamen’s Home" next to the church in 1904. This 'immigrant house' was created to serve immigrants and seamen who traveled to Baltimore; German, Irish, and Polish immigrants in particular were served. The immigrant mission operated until 1939.

In 1957, the church became affiliated with the United Church of Christ, the successor denomination to the German Reformed tradition. It formally recognized the affiliation in its name in 1972.

== See also ==
- History of the Germans in Baltimore
