= Timeline of Baltimore =

The following is a timeline of the history of the city of Baltimore, Maryland, USA.

== 18th century ==
- 1729 – Town of Baltimore founded.
- 1752 – 25 houses and 200 inhabitants.
- 1763 – Mechanical Fire Company organized.
- 1767 – Baltimore designated county seat.
- 1770 – Henry Fite House built.
- 1773 – Maryland Journal, and the Baltimore Advertiser newspaper begins publication.
- 1775 – Population: 5,934
- 1776 – December – Second Continental Congress meeting begins.
- 1782 – Lexington Market founded.
- 1784 – Christmas Conference (Methodism)
- 1787 – 1,955 dwellings in town.
- 1790 – Population: 13,503 people.
- 1794 – James Calhoun becomes mayor.
- 1795 – Holliday Street Theater opens.
- 1796
  - City of Baltimore incorporated.
  - Library Company of Baltimore founded.

== 19th century ==
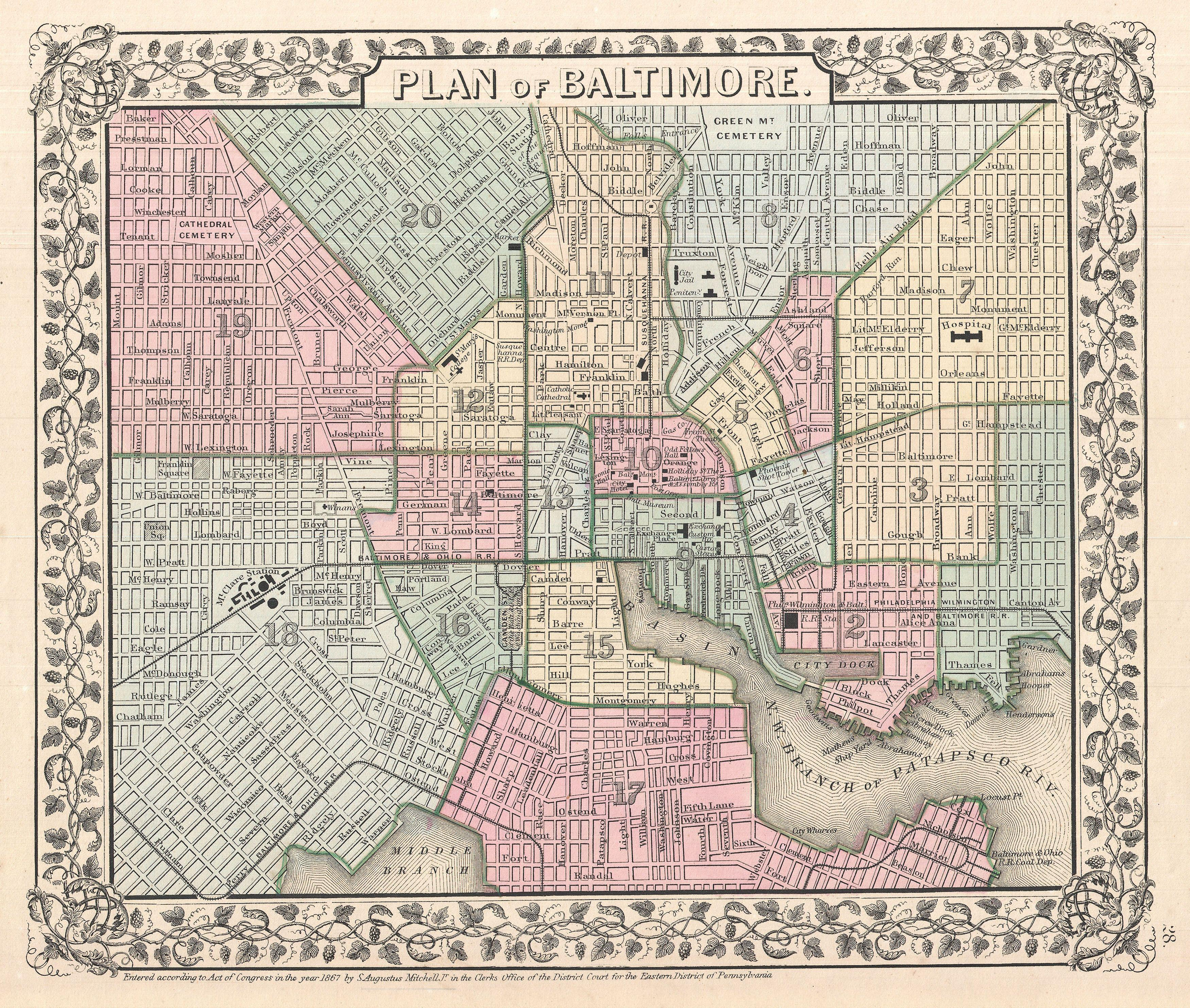
Map of Baltimore, 1867

- 1800 – Population: 26,504 people.
- 1803
  - Fort McHenry built.
  - Dispensary incorporated.
- 1806 – St. Mary's College and Theological Seminary incorporated.
- 1807
  - University of Maryland founded.
  - Baltimore Museum established.
  - Baltimore Circulating Library in business.
- 1809 – Joseph Robinson's Circulating Library in business.
- 1810
  - Population: 46,535 people.
  - Alex. Brown & Sons incorporated.
- 1814
  - September – Battle of Baltimore
  - Peale Museum opens.
- 1815
  - Battle Monument erected.
  - Baltimore Exchange opens.
- 1816
  - Asbury College founded.
  - Delphian Club founded.
- 1819 – Independent Order of Odd Fellows founded.
- 1820 – Population: 62,738 people
- 1821
  - Maryland Academy of Science and Literature established.
  - Basilica consecrated.
- 1822 – Adelphi Theatre opens.
- 1823 – Athenaeum founded.
- 1826 – Maryland Institute for the Promotion of the Mechanic Arts founded.
- 1827
  - Washington Medical College established.
  - Franklin Lyceum active.
- 1829
  - Mount Clare Station built.
  - George Washington monument erected.
  - Circus building constructed.
- 1830
  - Baltimore and Ohio Railroad begins operating.
  - Population: 80,620 people
- 1832
  - Cholera epidemic.
  - 1832 Democratic National Convention
- 1835
  - 1835 Democratic National Convention
  - Bank riot.
- 1837
  - Baltimore Sun newspaper begins publication.
  - Washington Hall opens.
  - Orchard Street United Methodist Church built.
- 1839
  - High School opens.
  - Mercantile Library Association established.
  - Green Mount Cemetery dedicated.
  - Municipal Record Office of Baltimore built.
- 1840
  - Madison Lyceum active.
  - 1840 Democratic National Convention
  - Population: 102,313 people
- 1844
  - Maryland Historical Society incorporated.
  - Western High School (Baltimore) opens.
  - 1844 Democratic National Convention
  - 1844 Whig National Convention
  - Baltimore-Washington telegraph line opens.
- 1845 – Newton University established.
- 1848
  - Howard Athenaeum and Gallery of Arts opens.
  - Olympic Theatre opens.
  - Concordia Club founded.
  - 1848 Democratic National Convention
- 1849 – Baltimore Female College in operation.
- 1850
  - President Street Station built.
  - Population: 169,054 people
- 1851
  - Baltimore becomes independent city.
  - New Assembly-Rooms open.
  - Baltimore Wecker newspaper begins publication.
- 1852
  - Loyola College established.
  - Apollo Hall opens.
  - 1852 Democratic National Convention
  - 1852 Whig National Convention
- 1853 – Baltimore Police Department established.
- 1856
  - Know-Nothing Riot.
  - 1856 Whig National Convention
- 1857 – Peabody Institute founded.
- 1859 – City Fire Department formed.
- 1860
  - 1860 Constitutional Union Convention
  - Population: 212,418
- 1861 – Pratt Street Riot.
- 1864
  - St. Francis Xavier Church dedicated.
  - 1864 Republican National Convention
- 1865 – Concordia Opera House opens.
- 1867
  - Concordia Hall is founded.
  - Morgan College established.
  - Normal school opens.
- 1870 – Population: 267,354
- 1871 – Ford's Grand Opera-House opens.
- 1872
  - Mount Auburn Cemetery established.
  - 1872 Democratic National Convention
- 1873 – Leadenhall Street Baptist Church built.
- 1875
  - City Hall built.
  - Academy of Music opens.
  - Free Summer Excursion Society incorporated.
- 1876
  - Johns Hopkins University founded.
  - The Maryland Zoo opens.
- 1877 – Railroad Strike.
- 1878 – George Peabody Library opens.
- 1880
  - Woman's Industrial Exchange founded.
  - Celebration of 150th anniversary of city.
  - Population: 332,313
- 1881 – Faultless Pajama Company in business.
- 1882 – Enoch Pratt Free Library established.
- 1883
  - Baltimore Manual Training School founded.
  - Colored High and Training School founded.
  - Baltimore Young Women's Christian Association founded.
- 1885 – Goucher College established.
- 1890
  - Post office built.
  - Population: 434,439 people.
  - Riverview Park opens.
- 1891 – Union Park baseball field opens.
- 1892 – Baltimore Afro-American begins publication.
- 1894 – Lyric Opera House opens.
- 1895 – Clifton Park opens (approximate date).
- 1896
  - Electric Park opens.
  - Colored Young Women's Christian Association founded.
- 1898 – Sharp Street Memorial United Methodist Church and Community House built.

== 20th century ==
- 1900
  - Population: 508,957 people.
  - City courthouse dedicated.
  - Baltimore Morning Herald newspaper begins publication.

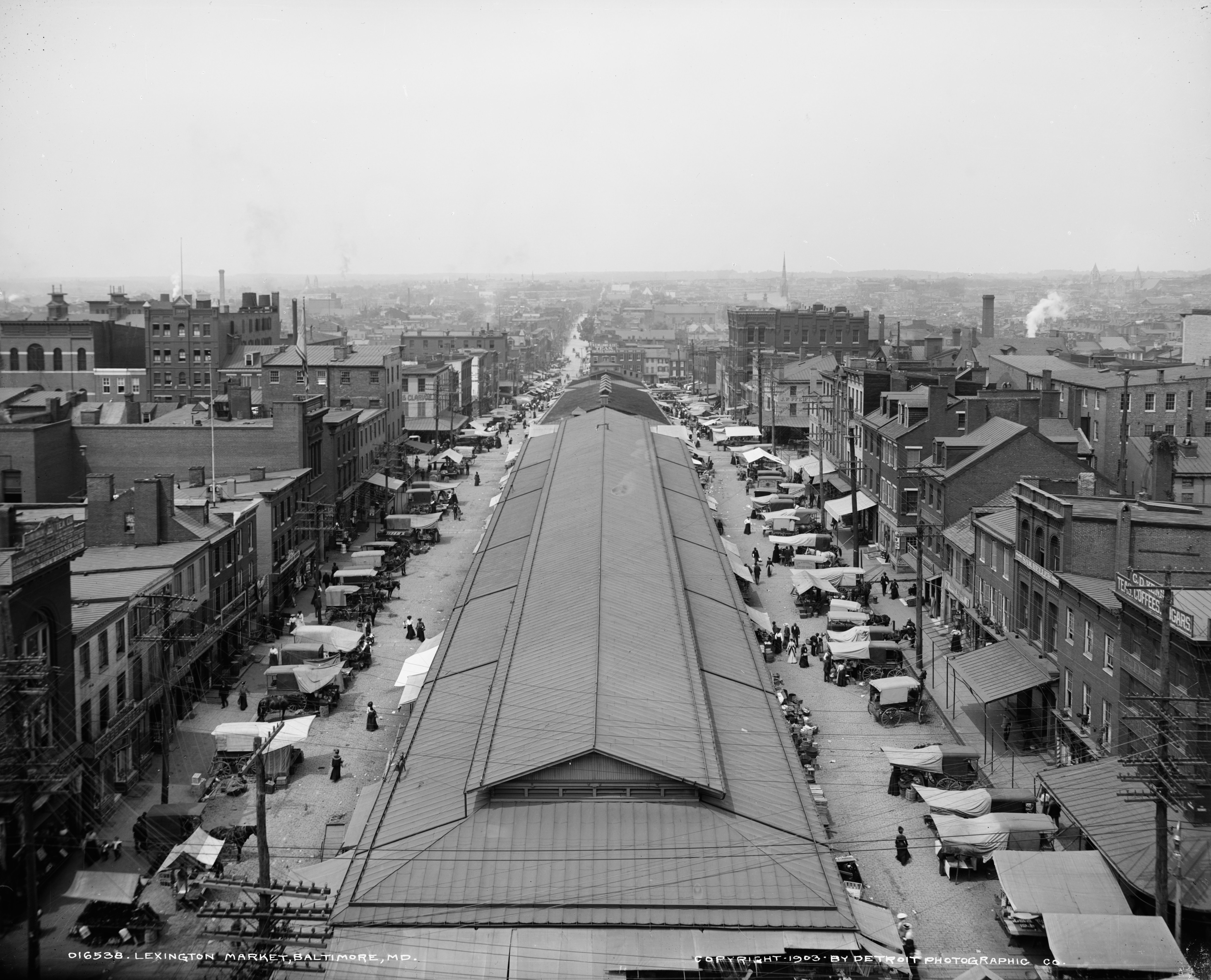
Lexington Market in 1903.

- 1903 – Belvedere Hotel opens.
- 1904 – Great Baltimore Fire.
- 1908 – Washington, Baltimore and Annapolis Electric Railway begins operating.
- 1910 – Population: 558,485
- 1911 – Pennsylvania Station (Baltimore) built.
- 1912
  - Arch Social Club founded.
  - 1912 Democratic National Convention
- 1914
  - Baltimore Museum of Art founded.

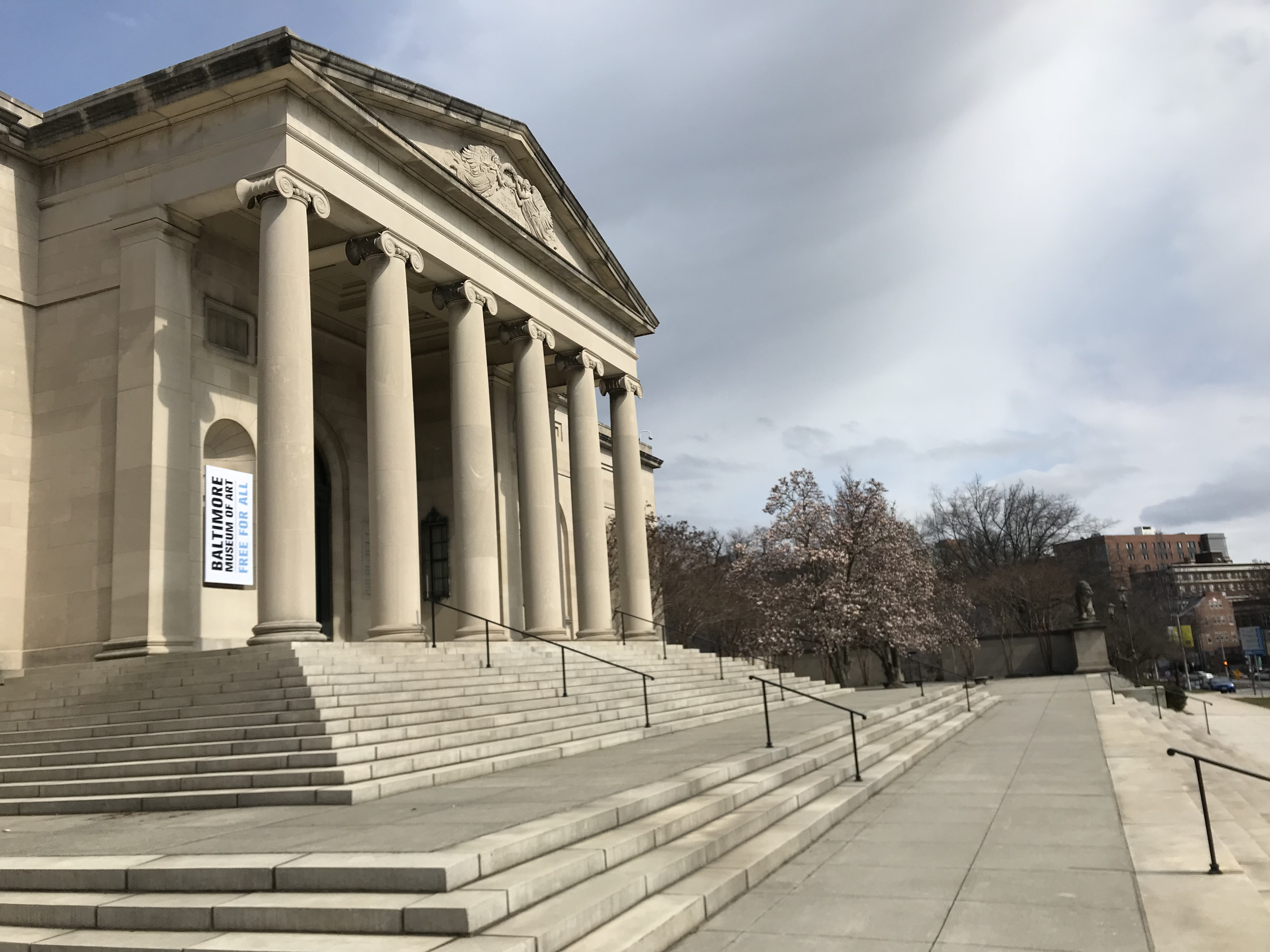
Baltimore Museum of Art

  - Hippodrome Theatre built.
- 1916
  - Baltimore Symphony Orchestra formed.
  - Baltimore Black Sox baseball team formed.
- 1917
  - Fort Holabird established.
  - Lithuanian Hall opens.
- 1918
  - William Frederick Broening was elected mayor.
- 1920 – Population: 733.826
- 1922
  - Memorial Stadium built.
  - Royal Theatre opens.
- 1923 – Howard W. Jackson becomes mayor.
- 1925 – University of Baltimore founded.
- 1930
  - Baltimore Colored Symphony Orchestra organized.
  - U.S. Post Office and Courthouse built.
  - Population: 804,874
- 1934 – Walters Art Museum established.

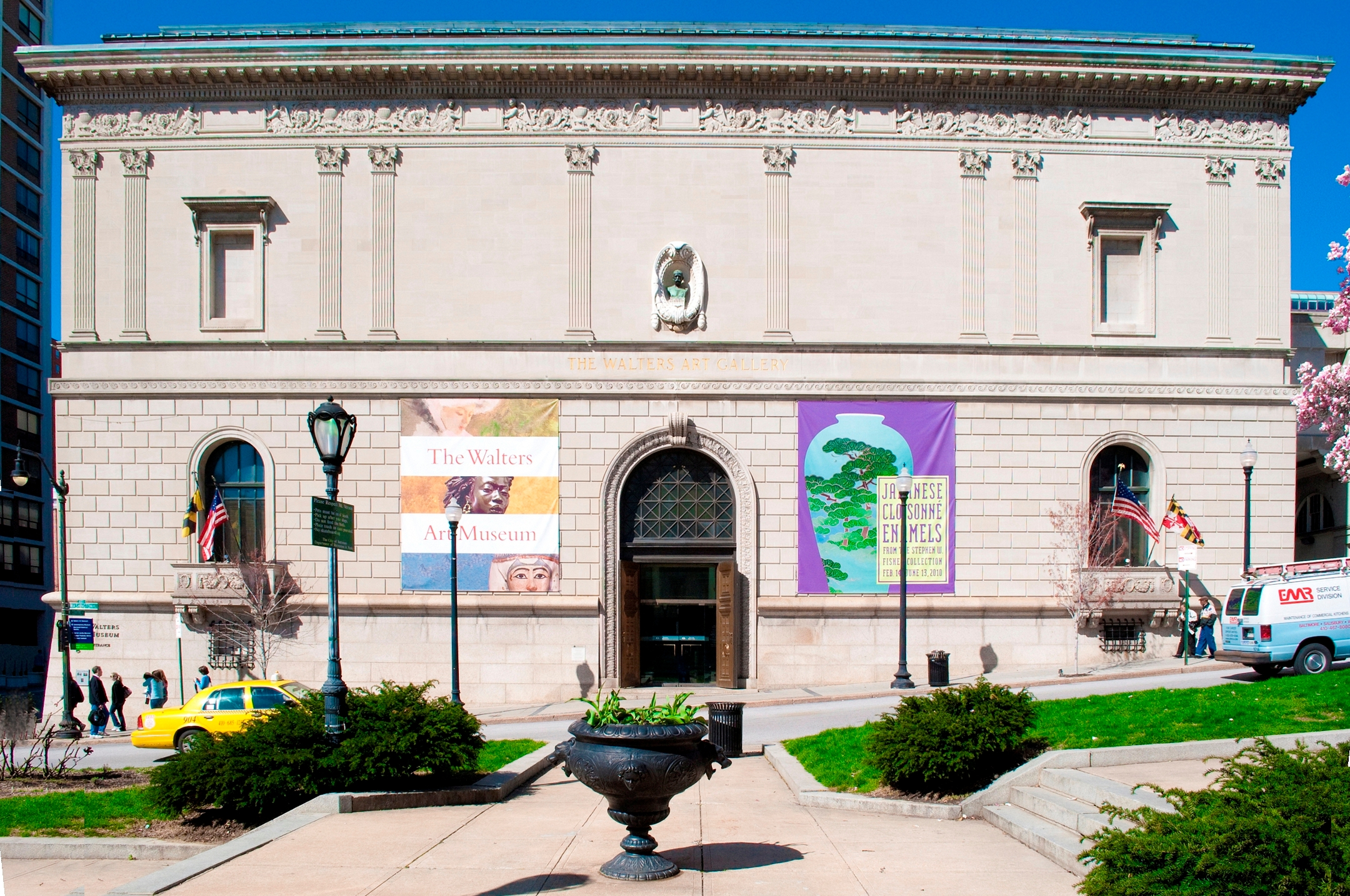
Walters Art Museum

- 1940 – Population: 859,100
- 1949 – Edgar Allan Poe House opens.
- 1950
  - Baltimore Civic Opera Company established.
  - Population: 949,708
- 1953 – B&O Railroad Museum opens.
- 1954
  - Orioles baseball team relocates to Baltimore.
  - Cylburn Wildflower Preserve and Garden Center formed.
- 1955 – Civil rights protest at Read's Drug Store.
- 1956 – Desegregation of the Baltimore City Public School System
- 1960 – Population: 939,024
- 1962 – CFG Bank Arena opens.
- 1963 – Center Stage (theater) opens.
- 1964 – Baltimore News-American newspaper begins publication.
- 1968
  - Baltimore riot of 1968
  - Baltimore American Indian Center is established.
- 1970 – Population: 905,787
- 1971 – William Donald Schaefer becomes mayor.
- 1974 – Baltimore municipal strike of 1974
- 1976 – Maryland Science Center opens.
- 1977 – Baltimore World Trade Center opens.

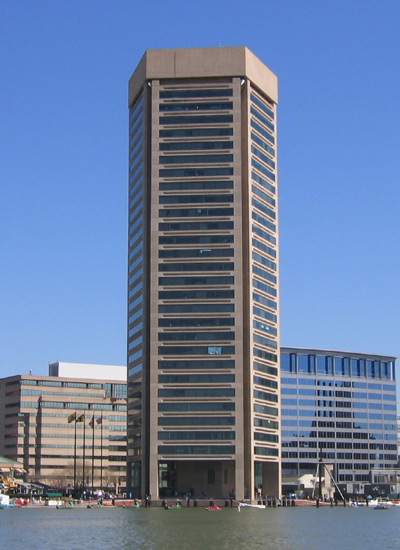
Baltimore World Trade Center

- 1979
  - Baltimore Convention Center opens.
  - Baltimore School for the Arts founded.
- 1980
  - Harborplace opens.
  - Baltimore Area Convention & Visitors Association formed.
  - Population: 786,741
- 1981
  - National Aquarium in Baltimore opens.
  - Baltimore Museum of Industry opens.
- 1982 – Joseph Meyerhoff Symphony Hall opens.
- 1983
  - Baltimore Metro Subway begins operating.
  - Great Blacks in Wax Museum established.
- 1986 – National Association for the Advancement of Colored People headquarters relocates to Baltimore.
- 1987 – Kurt Schmoke becomes mayor.
- 1989 – Contemporary Museum Baltimore founded.
- 1990 – Population: 736,016
- 1992
  - Baltimore Light Rail begins operating.
  - Oriole Park at Camden Yards opens.
- 1996 – Baltimore Ravens football team established.
- 1998 – Ravens Stadium opens.
- 1999 – Martin O'Malley becomes mayor.

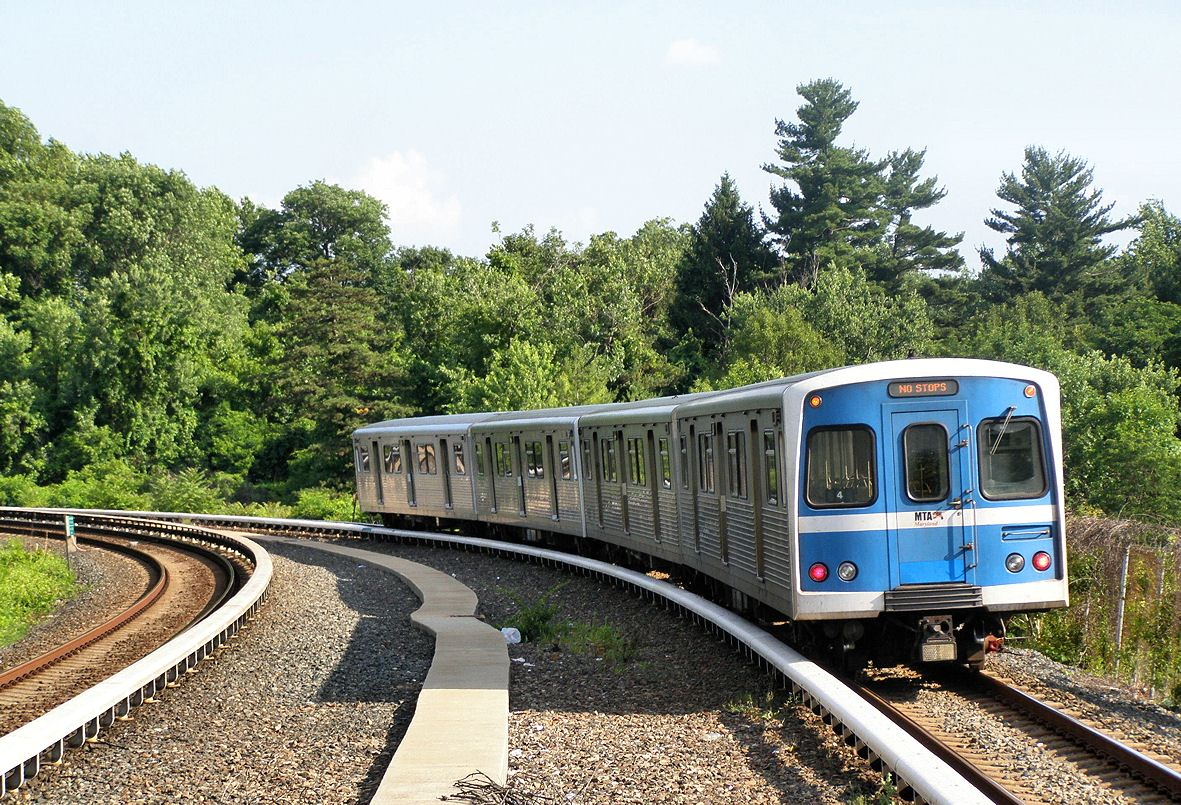
A universal transit vehicle on the Baltimore Metro SubwayLink departing Milford Mill station

== 21st century ==
- 2000
  - National Katyń Memorial is constructed.
  - Population: 651,154
- 2002 – The Portal (community center) opens.
- 2005 – Reginald F. Lewis Museum of Maryland African American History & Culture opens.
- 2006 – The Baltimore Examiner begins publication.
- 2008 – Hilton Baltimore built.
- 2009 – Sheila Dixon trial.
- 2010
  - Stephanie Rawlings-Blake becomes mayor.
  - Population: 620,961 people.
- 2011
  - Occupy Baltimore begins.

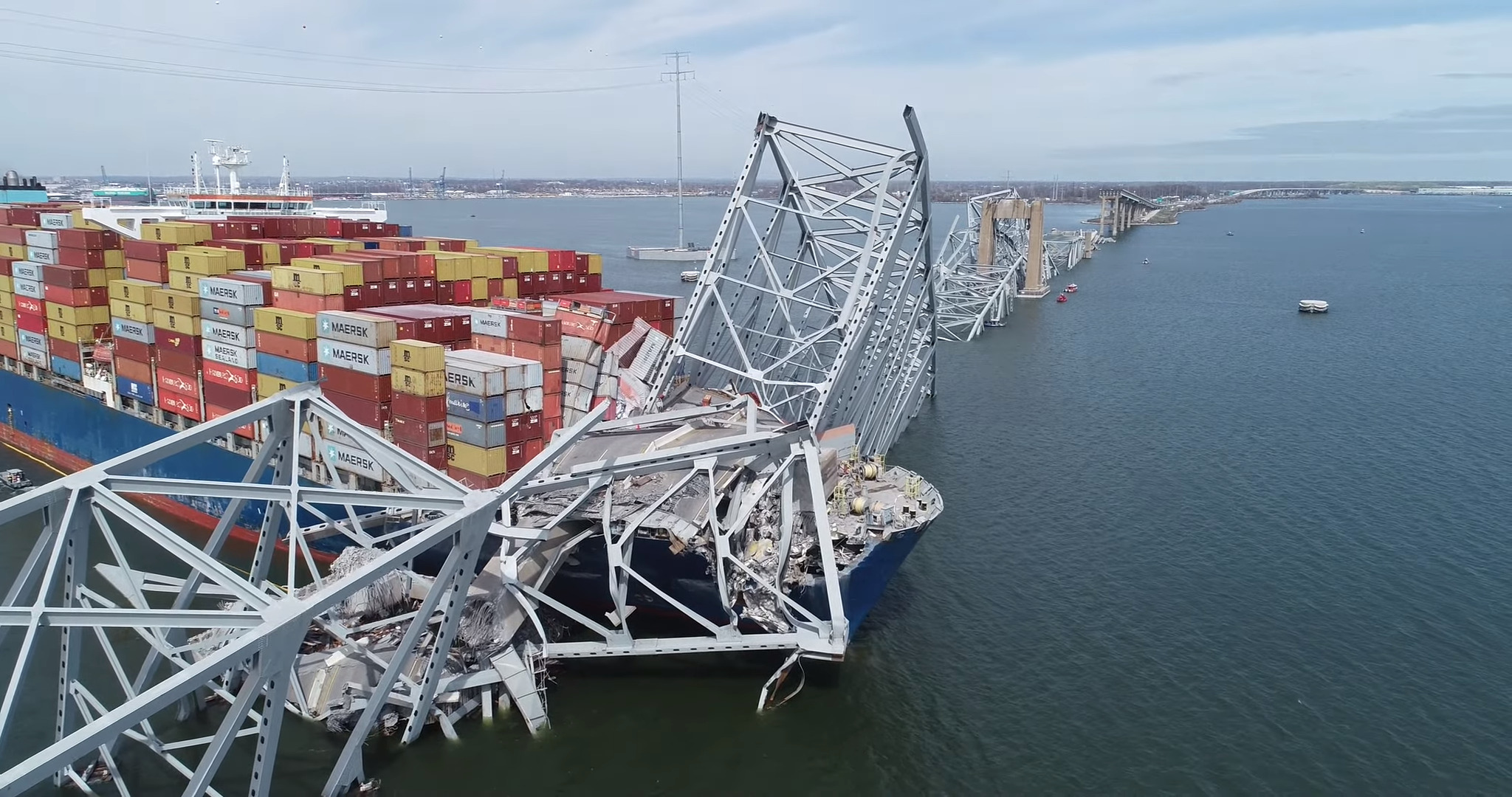
Francis Scott Key Bridge collapse

  - Lyric Opera Baltimore established.
- 2015 – Freddie Gray protests
- 2016 – Catherine Pugh becomes mayor.
- 2019 – Jack Young becomes mayor.
- 2020
  - Brandon Scott becomes mayor.
  - Population: 585,708
- 2024 – The Francis Scott Key Bridge collapses in a mass casualty incident.

== See also ==
- History of Baltimore
- List of mayors of Baltimore
- National Register of Historic Places listings in Baltimore, Maryland
- List of museums in Baltimore

== Bibliography ==
Published in the 19th c.

- Henry Schenck Tanner (1837), "Map of Baltimore", The American traveller (3rd ed.), Philadelphia: The author, OL 23337218M
- Henry Schenck Tanner (1841), "Baltimore", A geographical, historical and statistical view of the central or middle United States, Philadelphia: H. Tanner, Jr., OCLC 1525712, OL 24649753M
- J. Thomas Scharf (1874), The chronicles of Baltimore: being a complete history of "Baltimore town" and Baltimore city from the earliest period to the present time, Baltimore: Turnbull Bros., OCLC 11971847, OL 13489724M
- "Baltimore" . Encyclopædia Britannica. Vol. 3 (9th ed.). 1878. pp. 298–299.

Published in the 20th c.

- "Baltimore" . Encyclopædia Britannica. Vol. 3 (11th ed.). 1911. pp. 289–291.
- "Baltimore" . Encyclopædia Britannica. Vol. 30 (12th ed.). 1922. p. 395.
