= History of Germans in Baltimore =

History of Germans

The history of Germans in Baltimore began in the 17th century. During the 19th century, the Port of Baltimore was the second-leading port of entry for immigrants, after Castle Garden in New York City. Many Germans immigrated to Baltimore during this time.

== Demographics ==
In 1880, Germans made up the majority of the foreign-born population of Baltimore at 58% of all foreign born residents. 16.9% (56,354) of Baltimore residents were foreign born, 32,685 of them Germans (including Prussians, Swabians, and Bavarians).

In 1920, 19,813 foreign-born White people in Baltimore spoke the German language as their mother tongue.

In 1940, 9,744 immigrants from Germany lived in Baltimore. These immigrants comprised 16% of the city's foreign-born white population. In total, 23,889 people of German birth or descent lived in the city, comprising 17.1% of the foreign-stock white population.

As of 2000, 18.7%, or 478,646, of the Baltimore metropolitan area's population were of German descent, making it the largest European ancestral group. In the same year Baltimore city's German population was 48,423, 7.4% of the city's population.

As of 2011, immigrants from Germany were the seventeenth largest foreign-born population in Baltimore and the German language was the sixteenth most common language of those who spoke English "less than very well".

== History ==
=== 18th century ===
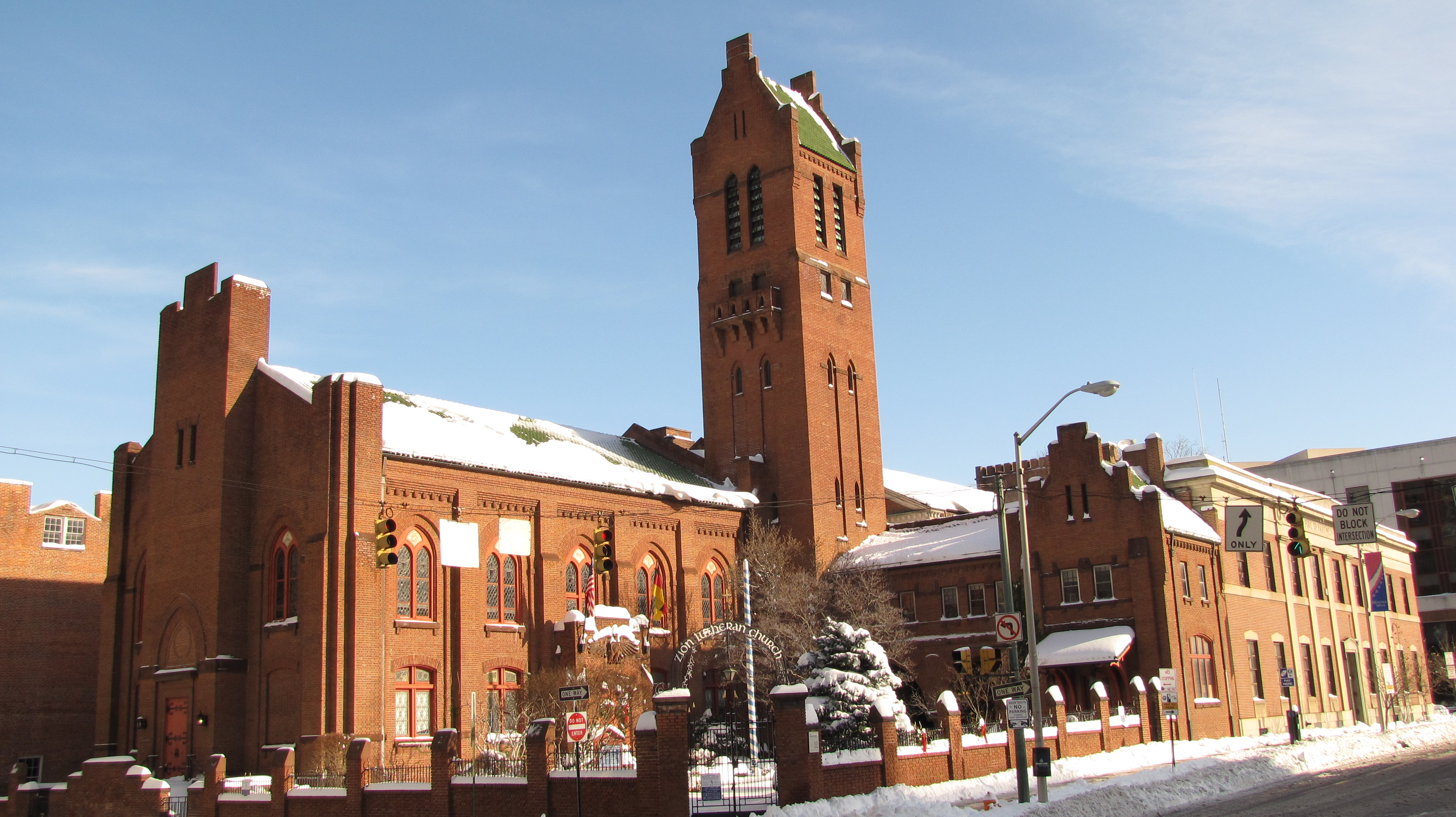
Zion Lutheran Church in December 2009.

German immigrants began to settle along the Chesapeake Bay by 1723, living in the area that became Baltimore when the city was established in 1729. German Lutheran immigrants established Zion Lutheran Church in 1755, which also attracted Pennsylvania Dutch settlers to the region. Early German settlers also established the German Society of Maryland in 1783 in order to assist German immigrants.

=== 19th century ===
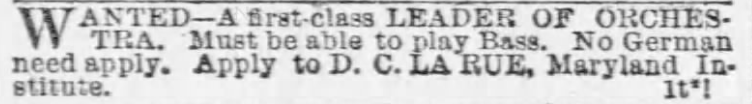
A January 15, 1869 advertisement in the Baltimore Sun: "No German need apply."

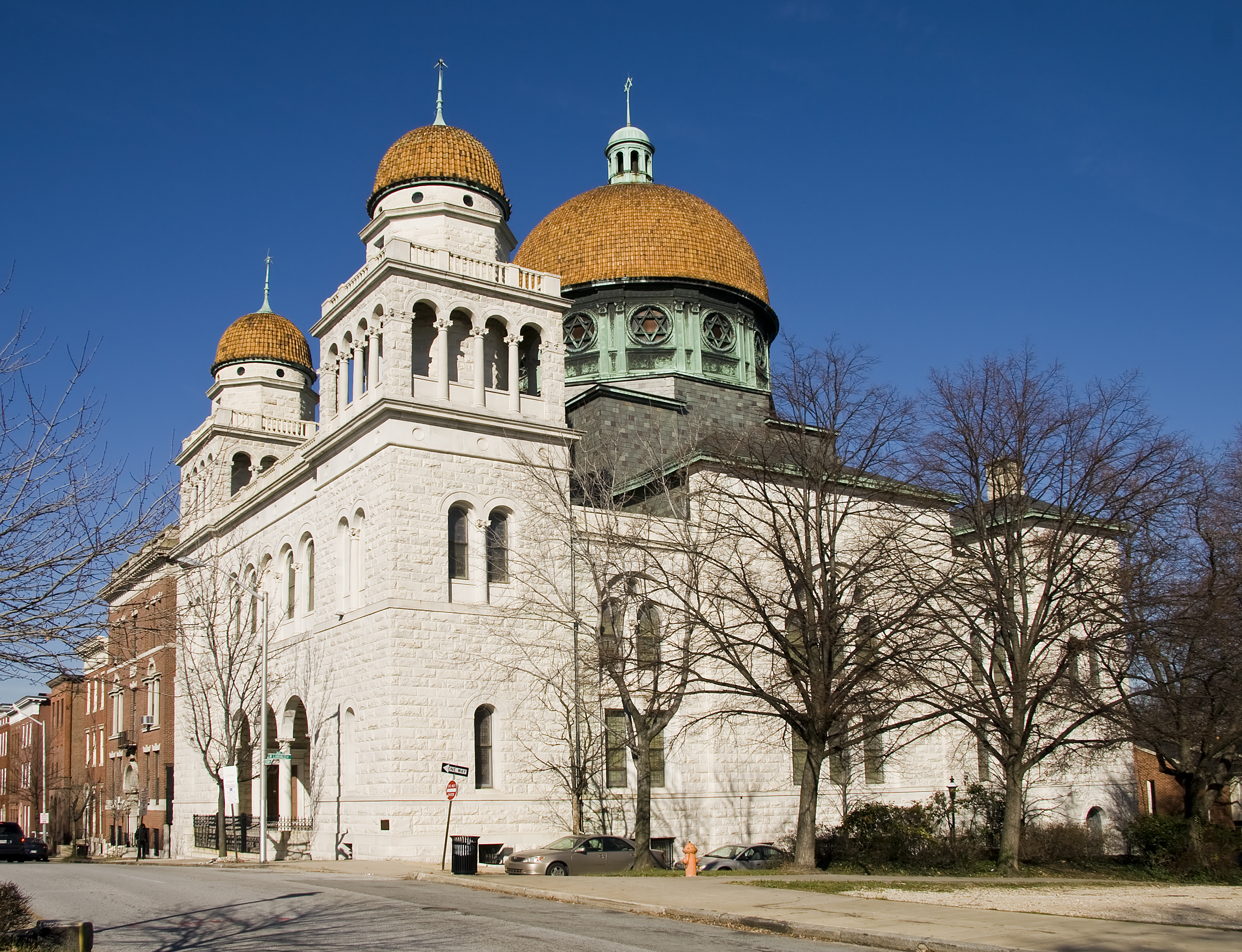
Eutaw Place Temple in December 2011.

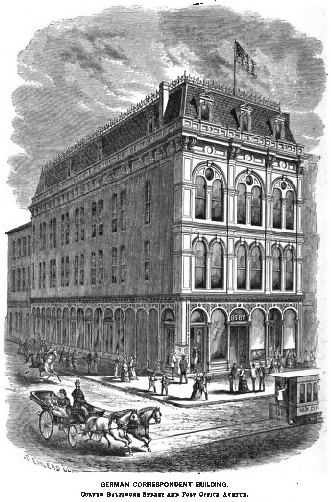
The Raine Building, publishing location of Der Deutsche Correspondent, southwest corner of Baltimore Street and Post Office Avenue (now known as Customs House Avenue), Baltimore Maryland, circa 1869, prior to the great 1904 fire

Following the War of 1812 in North America, a wave of German immigrants came from the Palatinate, Hesse, Bavaria, and Bohemia. Many fled from Germany between 1812 and 1814, during the War of the Sixth Coalition, (1812–1814), the last of the series of French Revolutionary Wars and the Napoleonic Wars, in order to avoid military conscription into the Royal Prussian Army. The port of Baltimore was developed as a gateway for immigrants during the 1820s, and soon became the second largest gateway to America after New York City, (and Ellis Island), especially at the terminals of the Baltimore and Ohio Railroad on Locust Point, Baltimore, which had made an agreement with the Norddeutscher Lloyd (North German Lloyd Line). By 1850, 20,000 German-born people lived in the city. Between 1820 and 1860, Germans were the largest group of immigrants to Baltimore. This wave of immigrants created numerous German institutions, including banks, insurance companies, and newspapers. German immigrants also created a thriving German-language press, including publications such as the Baltimore Wecker (Baltimore Alarm).

During the 1700s and 1800s, many states in the United States allowed male non-citizens to vote. Anti-German Catholic and anti-Irish Catholic sentiment following the War of 1812 and intensifying again in the 1840s lead many states, particularly in the Northeast, to amend their constitutions to prohibit non-citizens from voting. Non-citizen voting was banned by the Maryland Constitution of 1851.

Immigration from Germany increased again after the various Revolutions of 1848 flaring up throughout Europe, bringing thousands of "Forty-Eighters" to Baltimore. By the time of the American Civil War, there were 32,613 German-born residents of Baltimore, not counting their American-born descendants of first generation along with the earlier wave of colonial and pre-revolutionary era settlers. Many German immigrants were politically active in opposing slavery, and German newspapers that editorialized against it were targets of attacks by nativists and Confederate sympathizers. During the Baltimore riot of 1861, the office of the Baltimore Wecker was destroyed by mobs; the publisher, William Schnauffer, and the editor, Wilhelm Rapp, left the city due to the violence. The population continued to surge after the Civil War, due in large part to the agreement signed on January 21, 1867, between the Baltimore and Ohio Railroad and the Norddeutscher Lloyd, a German steamship line which brought tobacco along with further German immigrants to the port of Baltimore from Bremen, Germany. German immigrants disembarked from the steamships at B&O's pier, which was located in Locust Point. By 1868, one-fourth of Baltimore's 160,000 white inhabitants were German-born and half of the remainder were of full or partial German descent.

Many of the German immigrants who arrived during the latter half of the 19th century were affluent German Jews who created a number of cultural institutions, including Yiddish theatres such as the Concordia Hall and the Convention Hall Theater. Beginning in the 1870s, many wealthy German Jews built lavish homes in the northwest area of the growing city along North Eutaw Street and Eutaw Place towards the new Druid Hill Park of 1860. They also built several synagogues, such as the Eutaw Place Temple. By 1880, there were around 10,000 German Jews living in Baltimore, most of whom were of Bavarian and Hessian descent.

The German-born immigrant population in Baltimore peaked in 1890, when German-born Baltimoreans numbered 41,930 out of the total population of 365,863.

Holy Cross Church on West Street off Light Street in old South Baltimore near Federal Hill was founded in 1860 to serve the growing numbers of Germans moving onto the peninsula south of "The Basin" of the Patapsco River's Northwest Branch and the Baltimore Harbor, which had been annexed into the city in 1816. St. Elizabeth of Hungary Roman Catholic was later founded in 1895 in Highlandtown in east Baltimore to serve the German immigrant community in that part of the city.

=== 20th century ===
In the year 1900, the city's German population was 34,000, according to the United States Census. Around 1900 there were over 30 congregations in Baltimore that were holding Sunday services in German. By 1914, the number had risen to 94,000, 20% of city's population. During the 19th Century, many of the city's public schools were known as "German-English". By the 1920s, one third of Baltimore's public schools still offered German-language curricula and a quarter of Baltimoreans could still speak German fluently. Up until World War I the notes from the Baltimore City Council were published in both German and English.

Before and during World War II, many Jewish refugees fled from Germany to Baltimore. By the end of the War they numbered 3,000.

Holy Cross Roman Catholic Church, in the Federal Hill neighborhood, was listed as a German parish until 1959. The church had historically played an important institutional role for South Baltimore's large German community.

The last German-language publication in Baltimore, the Baltimore Correspondent (formerly Der Deutsche Correspondent), finally ceased publication in 1976.

=== 21st century ===
Aspects of Baltimore's German heritage remain, such as the Zion Lutheran Church. The church has held services in both English and German for over 250 years. There is also an annual Maryland German Festival held in the Baltimore area, which is sponsored by the German-American Citizens Association of Maryland.

== Culture ==
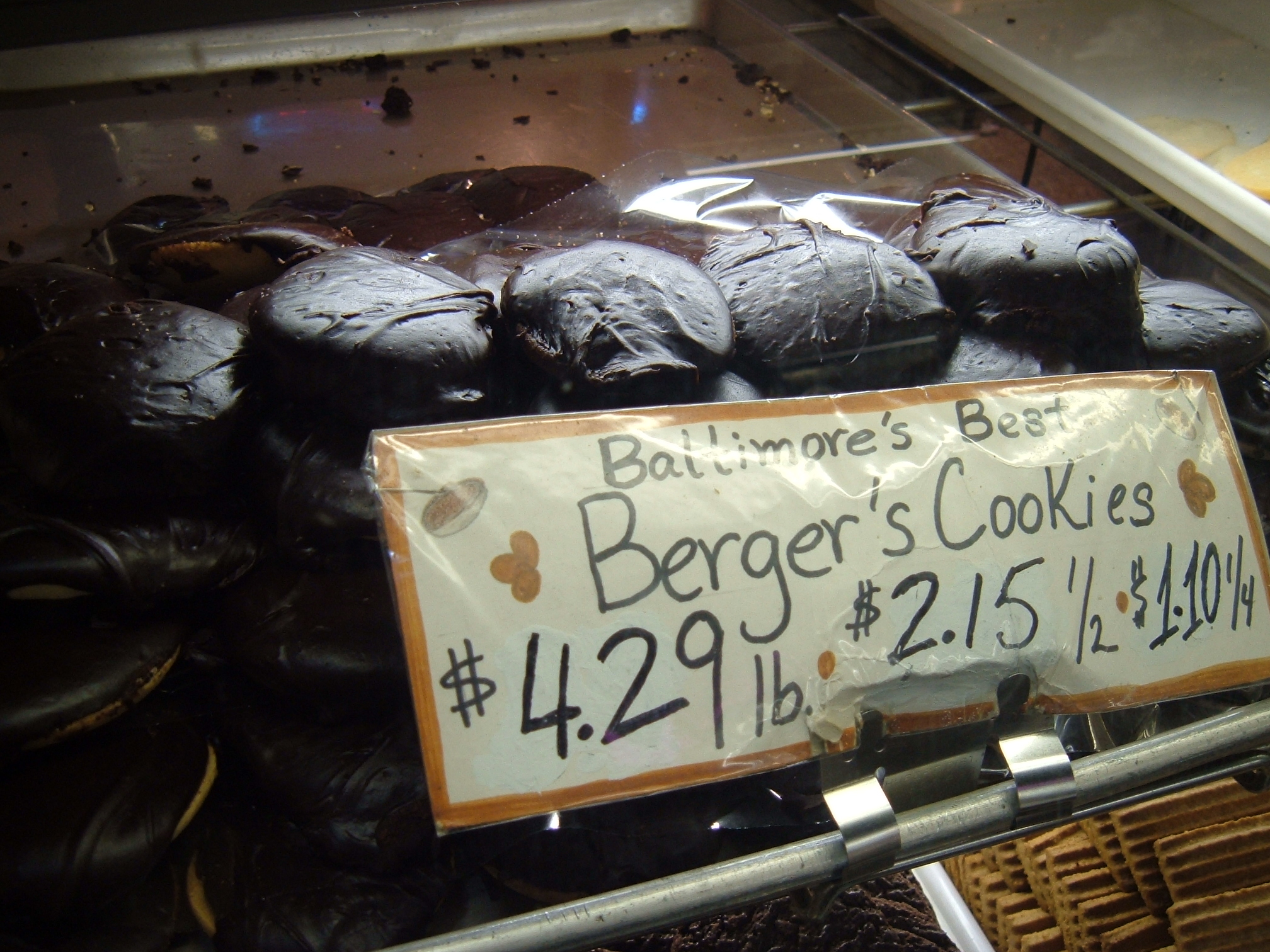
Berger Cookies.

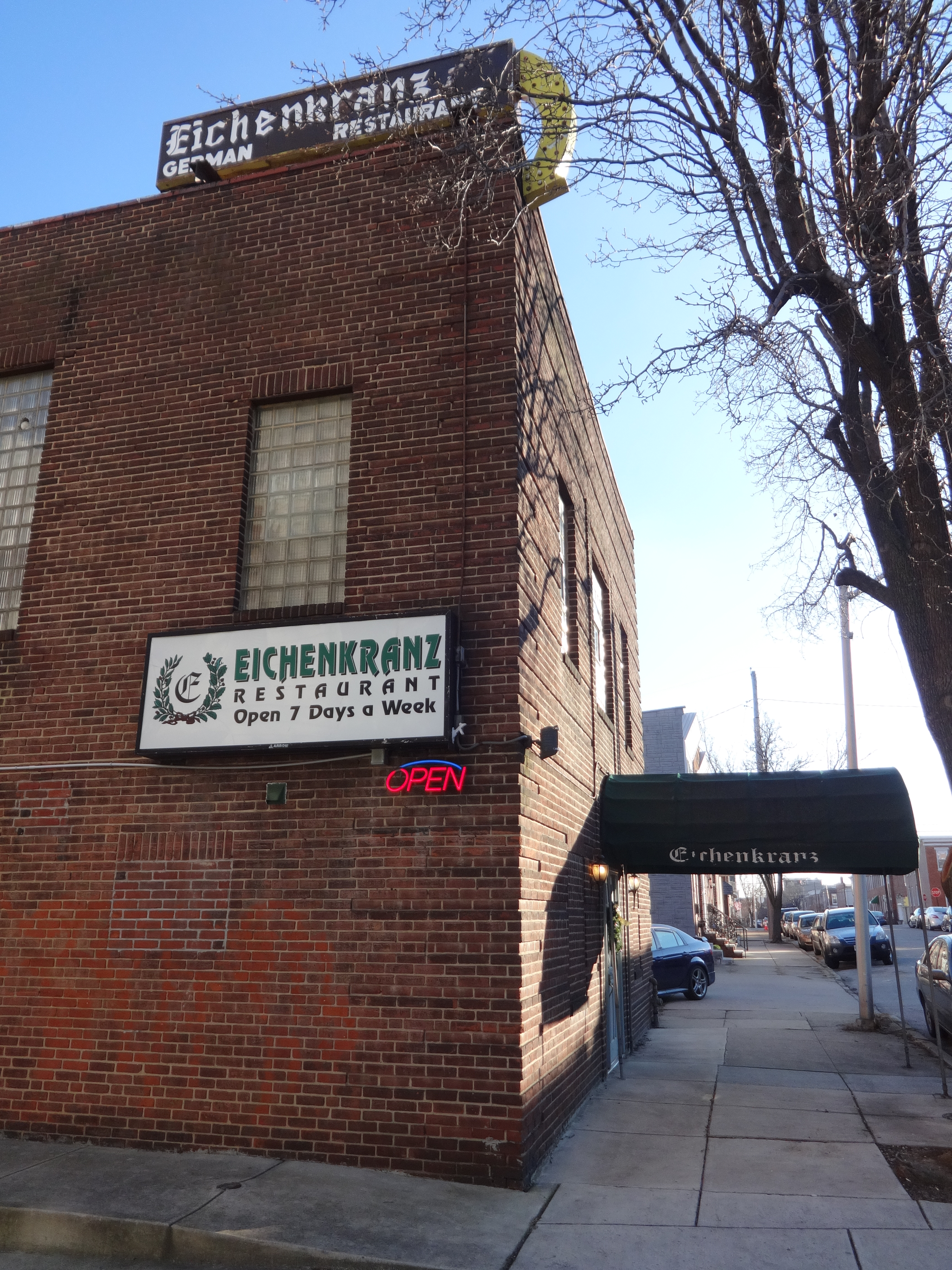
Eichenkranz Restaurant, December 2014.

=== German-American cuisine ===
The German immigrants influenced the cuisine of Baltimore. German beer breweries numbered in the dozens prior to prohibition, they brought lager beer to America which previously drank mostly ale; one of the largest lager breweries was the J. F. Wiessner & Sons brewery. The two centers of brewing in Baltimore were "Brewers Row" along North Gay Street, and "Brewers Hill". The Schmidt Baking Company was established by Elizabeth and Peter Schmidt, immigrants from Germany who used German recipes for their products. Berger Cookies were a German treat.

Baltimore used to have many German restaurants, though by 2014 Eichenkranz was the sole remaining restaurant that served German cuisine. That restaurant, in turn, closed down in 2015. Although Baltimore proper may no longer have authentic restaurants that serve German cuisine, there are several spots surrounding the city to get your German fix. Binkert's German Meats is a German butcher shop outside of Baltimore in the town of Rosedale. The Rathskeller is a German restaurant south of the city in Elkridge. For a local community experience, Zion Lutheran Church in downtown Baltimore, hosts annual events that feature German fare.

== Notable German-Americans in Baltimore ==
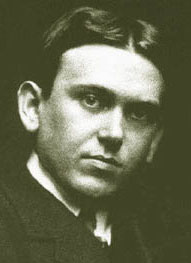
H. L. Mencken, an American journalist, satirist, cultural critic and scholar of American English. Known as the "Sage of Baltimore", he is regarded as one of the most influential American writers and prose stylists of the first half of the twentieth century.

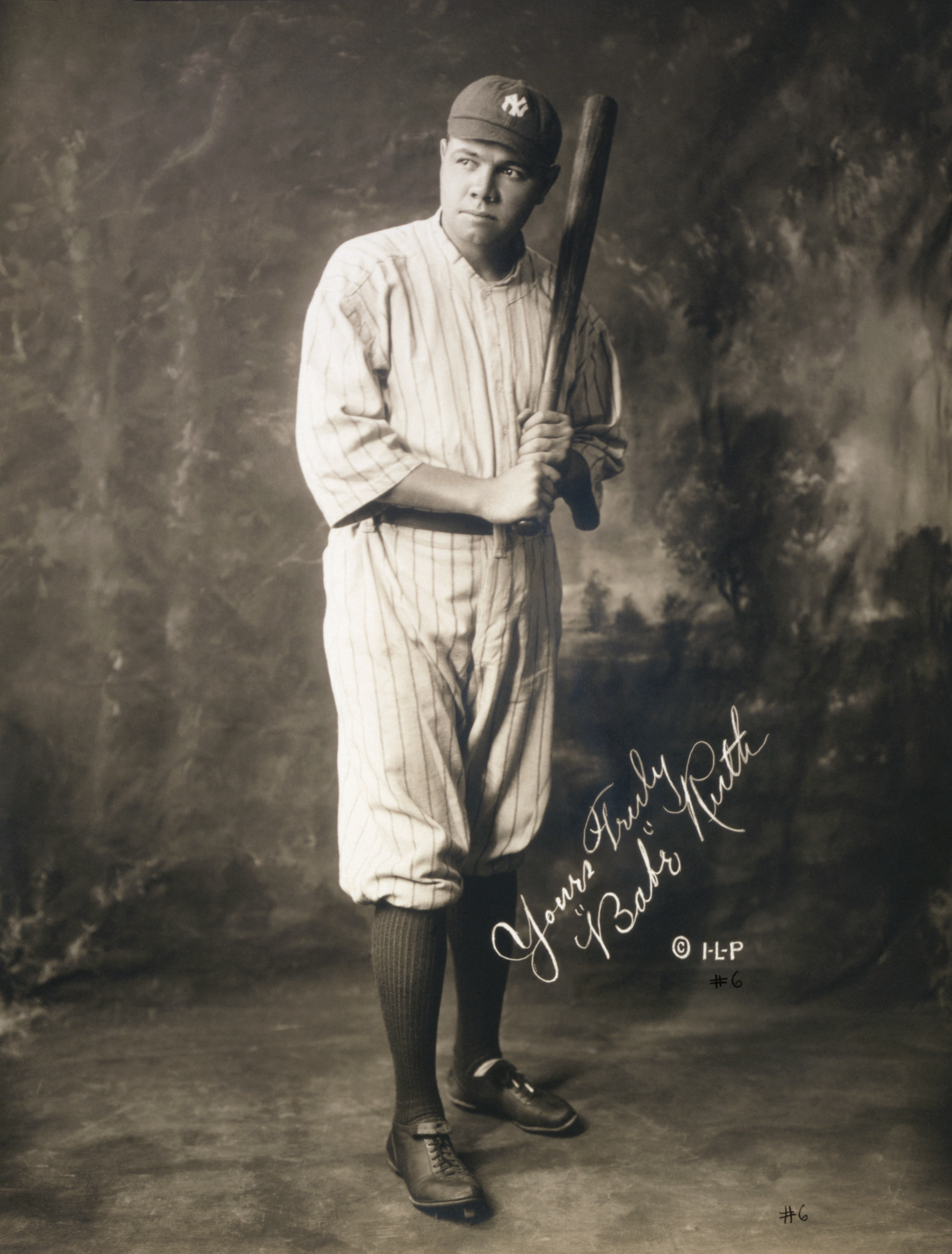
Babe Ruth, an American baseball player who spent 22 seasons in Major League Baseball (MLB), from 1914 through 1935. Nicknamed "The Bambino" and "The Sultan of Swat", he began his MLB career as a stellar left-handed pitcher for the Boston Red Sox, but achieved his greatest fame as a slugging outfielder for the New York Yankees.

- Otto Eugene Adams, an architect.
- Lisa Aukland, a professional female bodybuilder and amateur powerlifter.
- Louis Bamberger, was Newark, New Jersey's leading citizen from the early 1900s until his death in 1944.
- Clara Beranger, a screenwriter of the silent film era.
- Philip Berrigan, a peace activist and former Roman Catholic priest.
- Wendel Bollman, a self-taught civil engineer best known for his iron railway bridges.
- David Bachrach, a commercial photographer.
- Elsbeth Levy Bothe, an attorney and judge.
- Gustav Brunn, inventor of Old Bay Seasoning
- Jacob I. Cohen Jr., a banker, railroad executive, and civic leader who helped win for Jews the right to hold public office in Maryland.
- Moses H. Cone, a textile entrepreneur, conservationist, and philanthropist of the Gilded Age.
- Cone sisters, wealthy socialites who gathered one of the finest collections of modern French art in the United States.
- David Einhorn, a rabbi and leader of the Jewish reform movement in the United States who was chosen in 1855 as the first rabbi of the Har Sinai Congregation in Baltimore.
- Walter M. Elsasser, a physicist considered a "father" of the presently accepted dynamo theory as an explanation of the Earth's magnetism.
- Solomon Etting, a German-Jewish merchant and politician.
- Joseph Fels, a soap manufacturer, millionaire, and philanthropist.
- George A. Frederick, an architect whose most prominent commission was the Baltimore City Hall.
- George Fruits, claimed to be the last known surviving soldier of the American Revolutionary War.
- Louise Glaum, an actress known for her role as a femme fatale in silent era motion picture dramas.
- Brian Gottfried, a retired tennis player from the United States who won 25 singles titles and 54 doubles titles during his professional career.
- William Hickley Gross, a prelate of the Roman Catholic Church.
- Henry Gunther, the last soldier killed during World War I.
- Hilary Hahn, a violinist.
- David Hasselhoff, an actor, singer, producer, and businessman.
- August Hoen, founder of A. Hoen & Company, Lithographers, one of the most prominent printing establishments of its time.
- John Christian Keener - a Confederate Chaplain and Methodist Episcopal Church, South bishop in New Orleans.
- Nick Kisner, Professional Boxer.
- Isaac Leucht, a Reform Rabbi and communal leader in New Orleans.
- Margo Lion, a producer for plays and musicals both on Broadway and off-Broadway.
- August Mencken, Sr., the father of writer H. L. Mencken and founder of the "Aug. Mencken & Bro." cigar factory.
- H. L. Mencken (Henry Louis Mencken), a journalist, satirist, cultural critic and scholar of American English known as the "Sage of Baltimore".
- Ottmar Mergenthaler, an inventor who has been called a second Gutenberg because of his invention of the Linotype machine.
- Abbie Mitchell, a soprano opera singer.
- Herman N. Neuberger, an Orthodox rabbi and leader.
- John Neumann, a German Bohemian immigrant who became a Catholic priest of the Redemptorist order.
- Hermann Oelrichs, a businessman, multimillionaire, and agent of Norddeutsche Lloyd shipping.
- Gustav Oelwein, the founder of the city of Oelwein, Iowa.
- Wilhelm Rapp, abolitionist and editor of the Baltimore Wecker.
- Isidor Rayner, a Democratic member of the United States Senate representing the State of Maryland from 1905 to 1912.
- Abraham Rice, the first ordained rabbi to serve in a rabbinical position in the United States.
- Dutch Ruppersberger, the U.S. representative for Maryland's 2nd congressional district, serving since 2003.
- George Herman ("Babe") Ruth, a baseball outfielder and pitcher who played 22 seasons in Major League Baseball (MLB) from 1914 to 1935.
- Julius Sachs, an educator who founded Sachs Collegiate Institute.
- William Donald Schaefer, a politician who served in public office for 50 years at both the state and local level in Maryland.
- Carl Heinrich Schnauffer, a poet, soldier and editor.
- Kurt Hugo Schneider, a video editor, musician, singer and songwriter, whose primary medium is YouTube music videos.
- Hans Schuler, a German-born American sculptor and monument maker.
- Dwight Schultz, a stage, television, film actor and voice artist.
- Barry Sless, a musician who is skilled at both traditional six-string guitar and the pedal steel guitar.
- Rose Sommerfield, a teacher, activist, and social worker.
- Gertrude Stein, a writer of novels, poetry and plays.
- Charles Stieff, an industrialist and piano manufacturer.
- Louis J. Weichmann, one of the chief witnesses for the prosecution in the trial of the alleged conspirators involved in the Abraham Lincoln assassination.

== See also ==
- History of Baltimore
- Timeline of Baltimore history
