= Elsbeth Levy Bothe =

American judge

Elsbeth Levy Bothe (October 17, 1927 – February 27, 2013) was an American attorney and judge. Bothe was one of the first women to begin law school at the University of Maryland School of Law.

== Biography ==
She was born into a large German-Jewish family, the Levys, in Baltimore, Maryland and was the great-granddaughter of Isaac Hamburger, founder of Hamburger and Sons Clothiers. She attended the Park School in Baltimore and went to college at the University of Chicago, where she graduated with a Bachelor of Arts degree. She was one of the first women to begin law school at the University of Maryland School of Law, graduated from it in 1952 and was admitted to the Maryland Bar the same year. That year she also met her husband, Bert Bothe, a lawyer in the labor movement. She worked on civil rights in Mississippi and was active with the United Auto Workers and the Legal Aid Society upon her return to Baltimore. She practiced law as a defense attorney. She was elected Delegate of the Constitutional Convention of Maryland in 1967, Assistant Public Defender of Maryland 1972–78, President of the ACLU of Maryland (resigned in 1978), and Associate Judge of the Baltimore City Circuit Court 1978–1996. Bothe was a member of the Institute for Policy Studies Board of Trustees.

Bothe was the first female judge in Baltimore to handle serious criminal cases such as murders and rapes. Bothe understood the law and the constitutional rights of the defendants that she saw, but was prepared to pass sentences longer than the statutory minimum.

Elsbeth Bothe died on February 27, 2013.

== Sources ==
- A Judge with a Taste for Macabre: Bothe a character on and off bench. 'The Baltimore Sun', 7 May 1995.
- Heller, Janet. Sitting in Stern Judgement. Warfield's. Vol. 3, no.11 (Jan., 1989), p. 102–104.
