= Berger Cookies =

German-American cookie

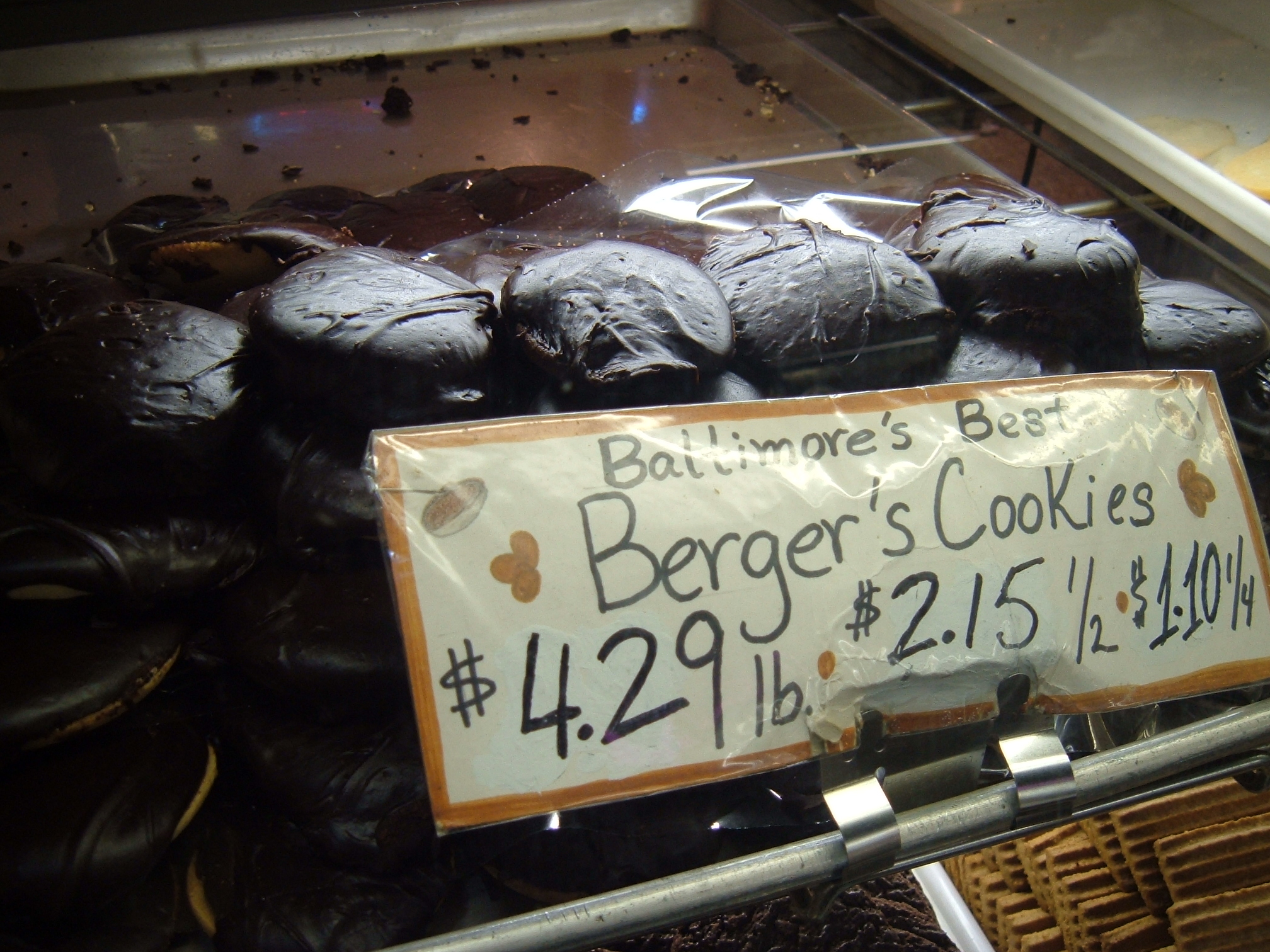
- Type: Cookie
- Created by: DeBaufre Bakeries

Berger Cookies are a handmade cookie made and marketed by DeBaufre Bakeries of Baltimore, Maryland. The cookies are widely known for their thick, chocolate frosting on an imperfectly shaped shortbread cookie. Similar to a black and white cookie, the Berger Cookie is frosted on its flat bottom, giving the final cookie an overall rounded shape. Each weighs 1.25 ounces, with the cake-like under-cookie weighing a quarter of an ounce, and the chocolate/fudge frosting weighing an ounce. DeBaufre distributes packaged Berger Cookies via a delivery network around Baltimore and markets the cookies worldwide via internet sales.

The history of the Berger Cookie traces directly to George and Henry Berger, brothers who emigrated from Germany in 1835 to Baltimore, Maryland, bringing their recipe. The bakery changed family ownership twice, to become today's DeBaufre Bakeries, which continues to make and market the cookies. As of 2016, the bakery employed 23 people and made roughly a million of the cookies annually, with the cookies comprising about 98 percent of the company's business.

Berger Cookies became widely known after they were featured in a 1995 article in The Baltimore Sun, with orders increasing from 300 to 10,000. They won the 2011 "Best of Baltimore Award," the "Best Cookie" award in 2011, and have been featured on the Rachael Ray show, on The Best Thing I Ever Ate on the Food Network, and on The Talk on CBS. In 2015, Berger Cookies were voted the "Best Local Foodie Product" by Baltimore City Paper readers. In 2021, Whole Foods marketed a copy of the Berger Cookie, as the "Charm City Cookie."

== Early history ==
After emigrating to East Baltimore, Henry Berger operated a bakery, subsequently operated by his son, also Henry. While the younger Henry took over his father's bakery, his two brothers, George and Otto, opened their own bakeries. Around 1900 Otto died, then George and Henry combined the bakeries to create Bergers. Eventually Henry died, leaving George as the sole proprietor of the bakery.

When George retired he sold the bakery and the recipe to Charles E. Russell. Charles' son, Charles Jr., took control upon his father's retirement. Charles Jr. and his sons, Charles III and Dennis, ran the business through the Depression. The Russell's employed two brothers, Charles and Benjamin DeBaufre, and when Charles Russell Jr. retired in 1967, he left the bakery to Charles III and Dennis.

The DeBaufre brothers, Charles and Benjamin had previously worked at Bergers, having left to start their own DeBaufre Bakeries Inc., struggling at first but in time able to purchase Berger's from the Russell family in 1969. Charles' son, Charles DeBaufre Jr., purchased part of the business in 1978. Charles Sr. died in 1988 leaving ownership to Benjamin, Charles Jr., and John Koehler. Charles Jr. became the sole proprietor of DeBaurfre Bakers in 1994 when Benjamin retired, and was running the business as of 2019.

== DeBaufre Bakeries ==
Berger Cookies are now made in a factory in the Cherry Hill neighborhood of Baltimore. As of 2013, four employees dipped a total of around 36,000 cookies daily. The original recipe that was created by Henry Berger in 1835 is still in use. As of early 2012, the annual sales of DeBaufre Bakeries were about $2.5 million, with Berger Cookies making up 98% of that.

In February 2012, the company offered a limited run of three variants — strawberry, lemon and rum — in response to slow January sales.

The Health Department closed the bakery in January 2013 for operating without the proper license. The bakery subsequently obtained the proper licenses needed and resumed production March 2013.

In 2013, DeBaufre Bakeries was concerned that a forthcoming ban on trans fat could impact the taste of their recipe, given that it used margarine and fudge, containing partially hydrogenated soybean and cottonseed oil. By 2017 The Baltimore Sun reported that DeBaufre's had successfully adapted the recipe with no apparent impact to its taste.

== See also ==
- History of the Germans in Baltimore
- List of shortbread biscuits and cookies
