= Baltimore Wecker =

19th-century German-language newspaper in Baltimore, Maryland

Der Baltimore Wecker
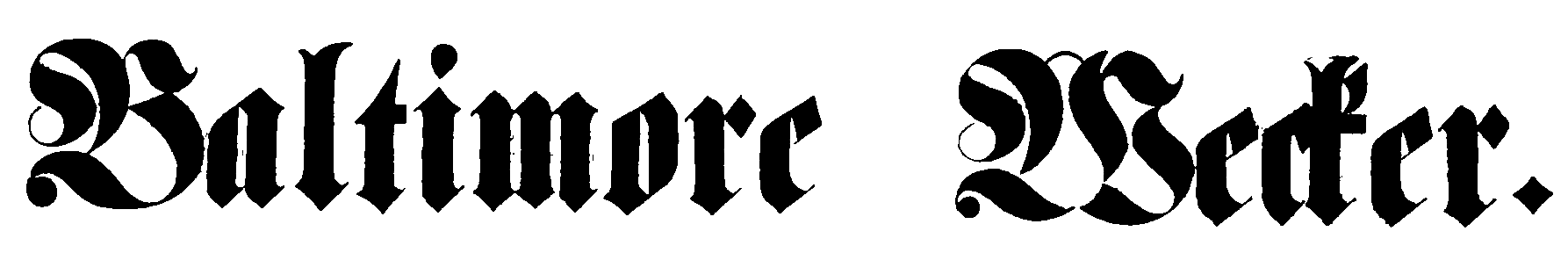

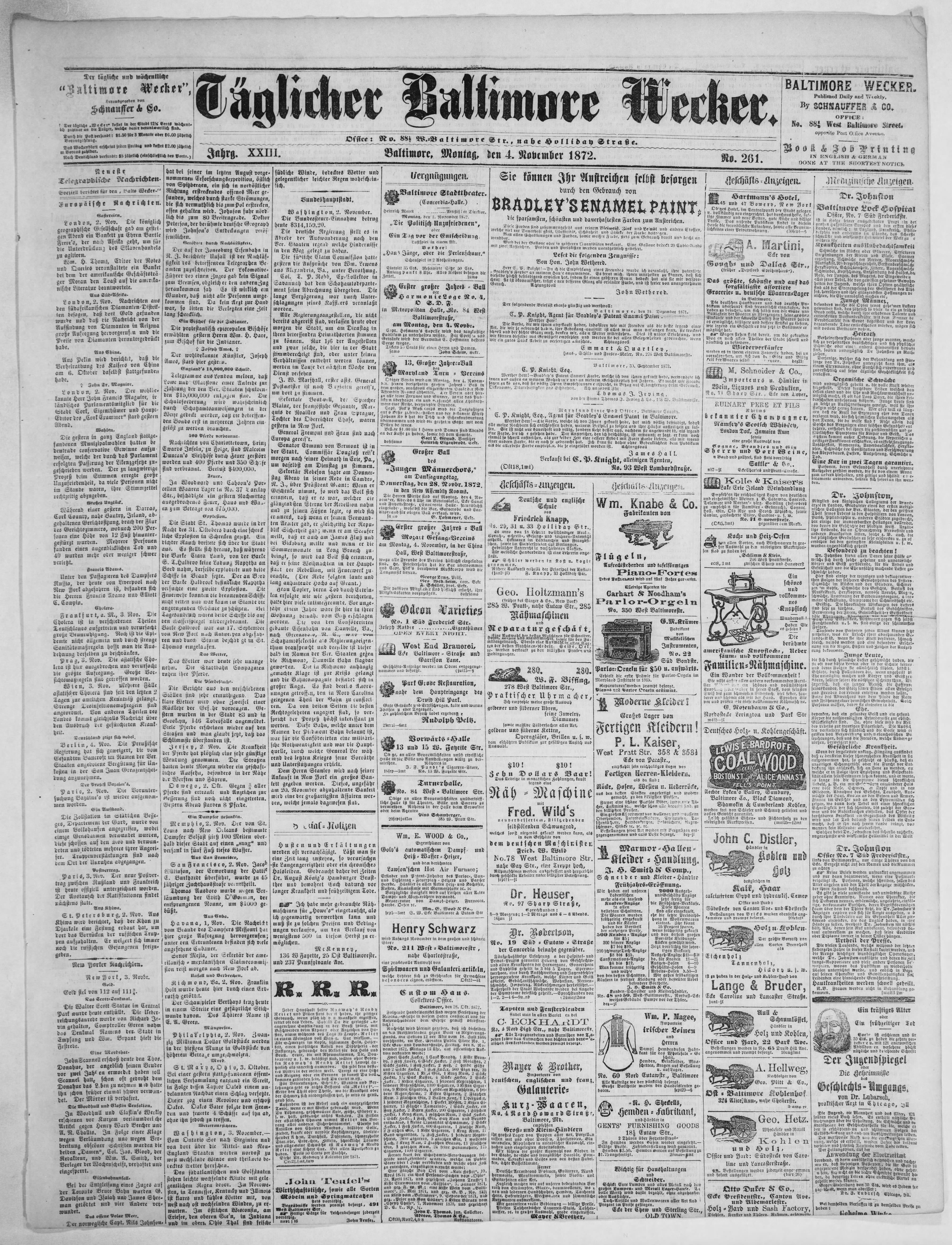
- Cover of the November 4, 1872, issue of the Täglicher Baltimore Wecker
- Type: Daily newspaper
- Founder: Carl Heinrich Schnauffer
- Publisher: Carl Heinrich Schnauffer (1851-1854) Elise Wilhelmina Schnauffer (1854-c.1859) Wilhelm Schnauffer (c.1859-1899)
- Editor: See List
- Founded: 1851
- Ceased publication: 1877 as a daily (at least 1907 as a weekly)
- Political alignment: Republican Party
- Language: German
- Headquarters: Baltimore, Maryland, United States
- OCLC number: 11592407

Der Baltimore Wecker was a daily paper published in the German language in Baltimore, Maryland. It was the object of violence in the civil unrest at Baltimore in April 1861 that produced the first bloodshed of the American Civil War.

Related titles for this paper were Täglicher Baltimore Wecker (“Daily Baltimore Wecker”), Wochenblatt des Baltimore Wecker (“Weekly Baltimore Wecker”), and Baltimore Wecker: Sonntags-Blatt (“Sunday Baltimore Wecker”).

== History ==
=== Origins in Turnerism & Socialism ===
Der Wecker ("The Alarm") was founded by Carl Heinrich Schnauffer in October, 1851. Its founder was before that time one of the editors of the Mannheimer Abendzeitung in the city of Mannheim in Baden, Germany, but by taking part in the German revolution of 1848–49 he was compelled to leave the country. He traveled first to Switzerland, and then sought asylum in England, before finally moving to Baltimore in May 1851.

One of the so-called "Forty-Eighters", Schnauffer was closely associated with the developing Turner movement, a broadly republican, German nationalist gymnastics and social organization. Specifically, at least at its origin, the Wecker was an organ of one of its radical branches, the Sozialistischer Turnverein (Socialist Gymnastic Association). At one point, the organization's official paper, the Turnzeitung, was even printed on the same Baltimore presses as the Wecker. The Wecker under the editorship of Schnauffer was sympathetic to the philosophy of expatriate German communist and fellow Forty-Eighter Wilhelm Weitling, although this was apparently a short-lived affiliation.

In its first years, the Wecker found itself one site in the intercontinental debates raging amongst the competing factions of the Communist League after its dissolution in 1852. In the pages of the Wecker Adolf Cluss, aligned with the faction supporting Karl Marx in the split, wrote editorials denouncing rival figures like Gottfried Kinkel, August Willich and Alexander Schimmelfennig. Schnauffer himself felt that the Kinkel-Willich faction's plan of raising money for a new German revolution was a waste of resources, arguing a revolution could not be imposed from without, and that the funds could be better spent on the direct aid of poor people.

In September 1854, Schnauffer died of typhoid fever. His widow, Elise W. Schnauffer, continued the publication without interruption, with another German Forty-Eighter, August Becker taking up editorship, apparently in tandem with the widow Schnauffer.

=== Abolitionism and Republicanism ===
Der Wecker was one of only three Maryland newspapers (along with Turnzeitung and the Jewish Sinai) that advocated for the abolition of slavery, all printed in Baltimore, and all in German. From the outset indeed, the paper had supported this and the other principles of the Republican Party, and this continued to be the case as the 1850s proceeded. Under Becker, the paper supported the candidacy of John C. Frémont in the 1856 United States presidential election. Such was its influence in Republican circles that in "An Address to the Republicans of Maryland" from October 1856, the Wecker was listed as the primary point of contact for those wanting to obtain a copy of the Republican ticket. Such full-throated support of Republican politics was a rarity below the Mason–Dixon line in this period: an 1859 list of "Republican Newspapers Published in the Slave States" put Der Baltimore Wecker among only 16 total papers. This made the Wecker a target for anti-Republican sentiment, and not long after the 1856 election, its offices were attacked by men attempting to incite a riot, although they were prevented from causing serious damage.

In 1857, Wilhelm Rapp accepted the editorship, taking over from Becker. Two years later, in 1859, the Wecker came into the hands of Wilhelm Schnauffer, the younger brother of Carl Schnauffer, whose widow, Elise, he married in that year. Wilhelm would maintain a stake in the paper until his death in 1899. Around this time, he also added a weekly edition to the paper, which soon commanded a large circulation in the counties.

The paper continued to advocate for its familiar Republican causes until the Baltimore riot of 1861 when, following the fighting between Union troops and citizens of Baltimore on April 19, the office of the Wecker (then on Frederick Street near Gay Street) was the next day surrounded by a crowd. Earlier that same day, the Turnhalle (Turner Hall) on West Pratt Street, headquarters of the Turnzeitung, had been totally sacked, as had been the offices of the abolitionist Sinai. Owing to the relationship between the Wecker and Turnerism, Rapp felt threatened enough to request assistance from George William Brown, who dispatched police to guard the building. While the account in The Baltimore Sun two days later maintained that "no violence was done," a series of proceedings of the Baltimore City Council in January 1862 show Wilhelm Schnauffer was seeking reimbursement in the amount of $250 (equivalent to $8,958 in 2025) for "damages committed on his premises by a mob on the 20th of April, 1861." According to a widely reported anecdote, further damage to the building and equipment was stopped when editor Elise Schnauffer stood in doorway, with a child in her arms, blocking the way of the mob until they departed.

Rapp briefly left Baltimore following the attack, returning before General Benjamin Butler's occupation of the city in May 1861, however he departed again for Chicago shortly thereafter, where he would remain for the duration of the war as editor of the Illinois Staats-Zeitung With General Butler in possession of the city, Wilhelm Schnauffer too returned and resumed the publication of his paper and the Wecker continued to be a firm supporter of the Union cause throughout the war.

=== Post-Civil War ===
In 1865, Franz Sigel became editor and entered into partnership with Wilhelm Schnauffer. Sigel had been another of his late brother Carl's revolutionary associates during the 1848-1849 tumult. This continued for two years, until Sigel went to New York City. Wilhelm Rapp returned from Illinois to edit the Wecker again in 1866, continuing until 1872 when he returned to the Staats-Zeitung. The Wecker was enthusiastically on the side of Prussia in the Franco-Prussian War of 1870–1871, with Rapp giving speeches in support of the now Kaiser Wilhelm I, arguing that "although those present were republicans, they could not forget that under the old man 'von Hohenzollern' — King William — Germany had been reborn." This stance of the Wecker was denounced by The Sun, which viewed it to be an abdication of the paper's earlier republican and anti-monarchist stances.

In the spring of 1873, Schnauffer, after 19 years, retired, leaving the paper in the hands of Blumenthal & Co. At some point prior to 1877, it passed to the proprietorship of Captain J.R. Fellman The daily edition of Der Wecker ceased publication in September 1877, but Wilhelm Schnauffer, who regained full control of all the assets at that time, continued to produce the weekly version. At this point, the Baltimore Wecker Sonntagsblatt, as it was known, was located at No 1 North Holliday Street. A second weekly, The Mirror was launched by the company in 1895. The paper continued to be published at least as late as 1907, when it was being published by Charles H. Milter from 11 West Saratoga Street.

== Editors ==
Portrait	Editor	Years
	Carl Heinrich Schnauffer	1851-1854
	Elise Wilhelmina Schnauffer	1854-1861(?)
	August Becker	1854-1857
	Karl Gottfried Becker	?
	Wilhelm Rapp	1857–1861, 1866-1872
	Franz Sigel	1865-1866

== See also ==
- History of the Germans in Baltimore
- German language newspapers in the United States
