= St. Mary, Star of the Sea (Baltimore) =

Church in Maryland, United States

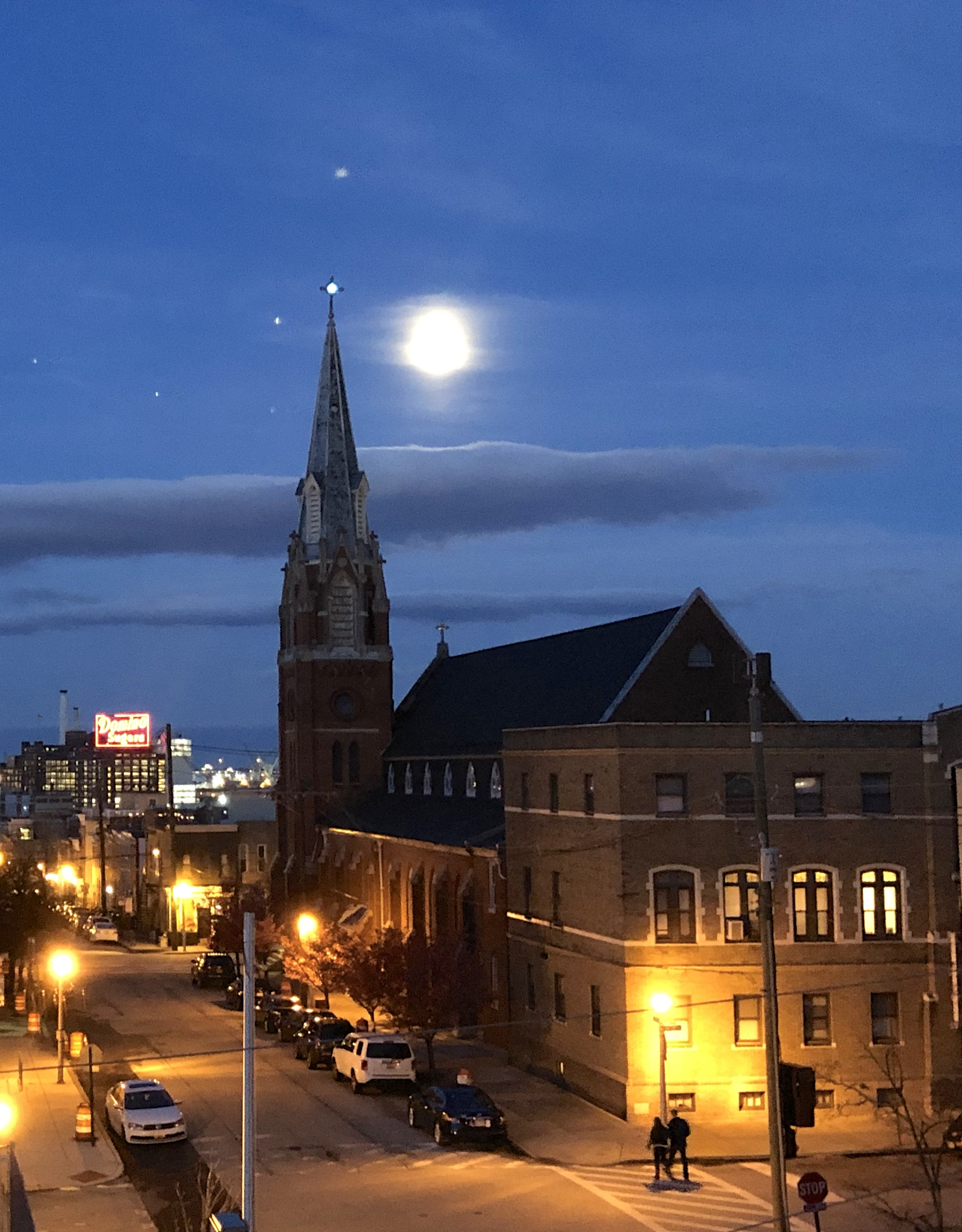
- Night view of St. Mary, Star of the Sea, highlighting the iconic beacon atop its spire
- St. Mary, Star of the Sea
- 39°16′26″N 76°36′32″W
- Location: 1400 Riverside Ave, Baltimore, MD 21230; Baltimore, Maryland
- Country: United States
- Denomination: Roman Catholic
- Website: www.southbaltcatholic.org/st-mary-star-of-the-sea/

History
- Status: Parish
- Dedication: Our Lady, Star of the Sea
- Consecrated: March 26, 1871

Architecture
- Functional status: Active
- Architectural type: Church
- Style: Late Victorian/Gothic Revival
- Groundbreaking: May 9, 1869
- Completed: 1871

Specifications
- Materials: brick, limestone, glass

Administration
- Archdiocese: Baltimore
- Parish: Catholic Community of South Baltimore

St. Mary, Star of the Sea is a Roman Catholic Church in the Federal Hill South neighborhood of Baltimore, Maryland. The church venerates Stella Maris, Our Lady, Star of the Sea, and carries a beacon atop its spire to welcome sailors to the Port of Baltimore.

== History ==
In the late 1800s, the South Baltimore peninsula was populated by immigrant Irish and German communities. The expanding population worked primarily as sailors, shipbuilders, and workers on the Baltimore & Ohio Railroad around the point. A direct passenger rout ran by Norddeutscher Lloyd between Bremen to Port Covington on the south end of the peninsula became a big source of population influx. The two communities established parishes to serve their rapidly growing numbers.

The parish of St. Mary, Star of the Sea was founded in 1868 to serve the local Irish Catholic community by Father Peter McCoy, Pastor of St. Lawrence Church, now Our Lady of Good Counsel Catholic Church (Baltimore), in Locust Point. The new Irish Catholic parish was founded a few blocks away from the German Catholic parish of the Holy Cross that was built just a few years prior. The first stage of construction of the new church was completed by 1871, and was fully funded by local festivals and street harvest markets.

After the construction of the church's spire, a glass star illuminated by candles was placed at the top, as a beacon visible from ships entering the port to welcome home Irish sailors.

== References and sources ==
References
