= George Frederick Boyle =

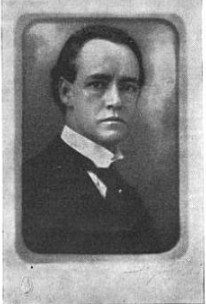

George Frederick Boyle (June 29, 1886 – June 20, 1948) was an Australian, and later American pianist, composer and pedagogue. He moved to the United States in 1910 and remained there until his death in 1948.

== Biography ==
Boyle was born in the Sydney suburb of Woollahra, New South Wales, on June 29, 1886. His father, George E. Boyle, was a teacher of singing and conductor of the Sydney Choral Society, and his mother, Elizabeth J. "Lizzie" Boyle (died 7 July 1936), a leading Sydney pianist and accompanist. He was taught the piano by his mother and later by Sydney Moss. In 1901, aged 14 or 15, he made a concert tour of New South Wales with John Lemmone's concert company, later with the Russian pianist Mark Hambourg through towns and cities in Australia and New Zealand. In 1904, the visiting Polish pianist Ignacy Jan Paderewski met Boyle and suggested that he study with Ferruccio Busoni in Berlin. Boyle was touring with Hambourg at the time, and it was he who ensured Boyle was introduced to Busoni. He studied with Busoni for five years, from 1905 to 1910. He was to recall Busoni as "the greatest single influence to which circumstance or my own design have ever subjected me". In 1909 Boyle played Chopin's 1st Piano Concerto at The Proms, under Henry Wood, an engagement that Busoni had secured for him. Also in 1909, Busoni edited Franz Liszt's Polonaise No. 2 by replacing the existing ending, which he considered unsatisfactory, with a more fitting brilliant cadenza and coda, and dedicated this edition to George Frederick Boyle. Boyle himself became renowned as a performer of Liszt's Sonata in B minor.

After moving to the United States in 1910, Boyle gave the American premiere of Debussy's Préludes. On Busoni's recommendation, he taught at the Peabody Institute (1910–22), succeeding his Australian countryman Ernest Hutcheson as head of the piano department when aged only 24. He then taught at the Curtis Institute of Music (1924–26), and the Institute of Musical Art and its successor, the Juilliard School (1923–40). His students included Aaron Copland, Alex North, Samuel Barber and Elmer Burgess.

=== Personal life ===
After divorcing his first wife, Boyle married one of his students at Zion Lutheran Church in Baltimore; less than a decade later, the couple took part in a Nevada divorce case, according to a 1922 Baltimore Sun article.

Boyle died in Philadelphia on June 20, 1948, at the age of 61.

== Compositions ==
Boyle wrote an opera titled The Black Rose; nine orchestral works, including a "symphonic fantasia" and a piano concerto in D minor in 1911 (premiered the same year by Ernest Hutcheson), a violin concerto and a cello concerto; two cantatas; more than 30 songs; eight pieces of chamber music; and more than 70 piano pieces.

== Recordings ==
In 2012 the Australian pianist Timothy Young recorded Boyle's Piano Sonata (dedicated to Ernest Hutcheson), Ballade (dedicated to Leopold Godowsky), and Five Piano Pieces, the first recording of any of Boyle's music. In 2016 Piers Lane with the Adelaide Symphony Orchestra conducted by Johannes Fritzsch recorded the Piano Concerto in D minor for Hyperion.
