= Concordia Hall (Baltimore) =

Music venue

Coordinates: 39°17′18.5″N 76°37′15.25″W

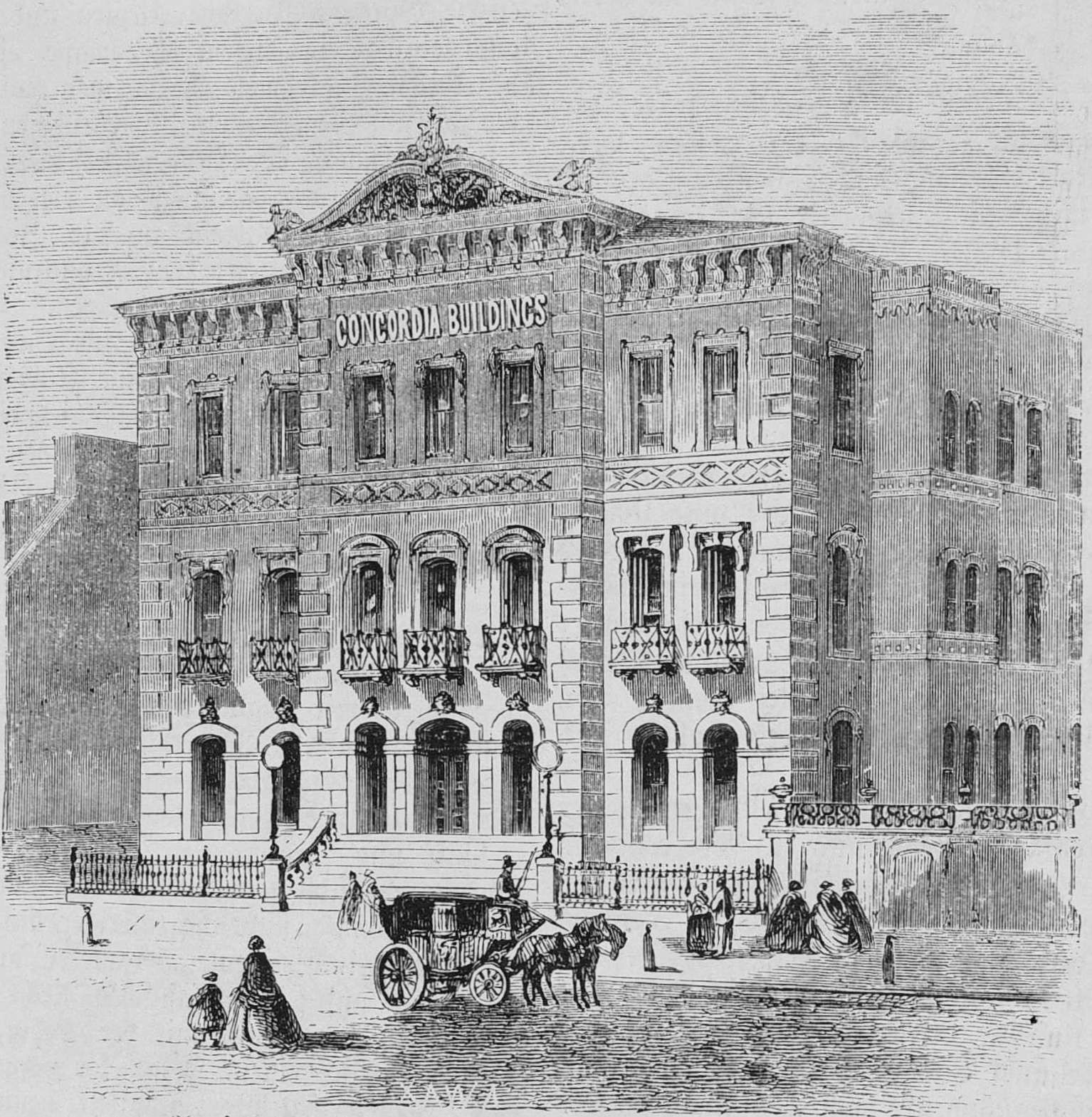
The Concordia Hall, presented in 1866 in Die Gartenlaube

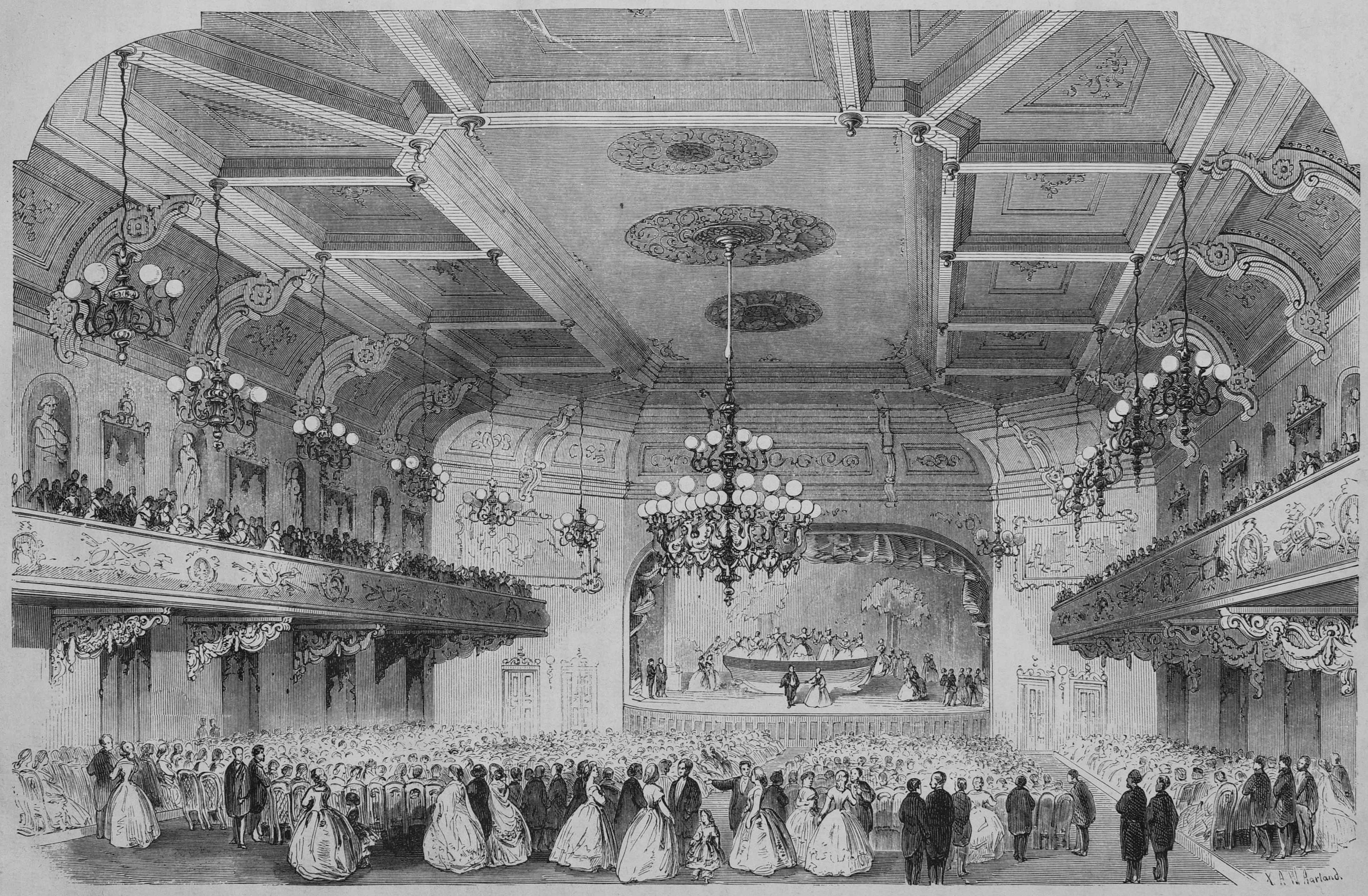
Interior (1866)

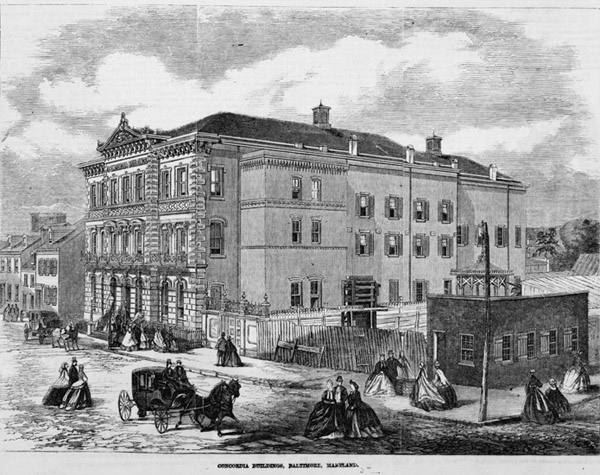
Concordia Opera House by Adolf Cluss

Concordia Hall, also known as Concordia Opera House, was a music venue in Baltimore, Maryland. It was founded in 1866 by Germans from the largest immigrant community in that city. It was the location for readings by Charles Dickens in 1868, during his second visit to America., and other visiting lecturers and musical groups, and the site of civic events. Concordia Hall was located on Eutaw Street, south of German Street (now known as Redwood Street).

The great Yiddish actor, Boris Thomashefsky, came to Baltimore in the mid-1880s and gave what was probably the first performance of Yiddish theater in Baltimore at Concordia Hall. In his autobiography he left a description of the Hall:

"...Concordia Hall, the aristocratic club of the Baltimore German Jews. The Hall was truly a beauty. No more beautiful hall have I seen even up to the present day. There were more than one thousand seats, true theater seats. The hall was decorated all in gold. The seats were gilded and covered in red velvet. The floors were spread with expensive carpets. The stage was also gorgeous, bedecked with expensive decorations. Huge gilt chandeliers lit the beautiful interior. The dressing rooms were spacious, airy and lavishly furnished. The entry to the theater was truly magnificent. Wide steps of white marble with six marble columns on each side just like the White House in Washington. It was in this spectacular palace where we would play our first Yiddish performance." (Translation by Daniel Setzer)

A fire destroyed the Corcordia in 1891.
