= Zion Lutheran Church (Baltimore) =

Historic church in Maryland, US

- U.S. National Register of Historic Places
- Baltimore City Landmark
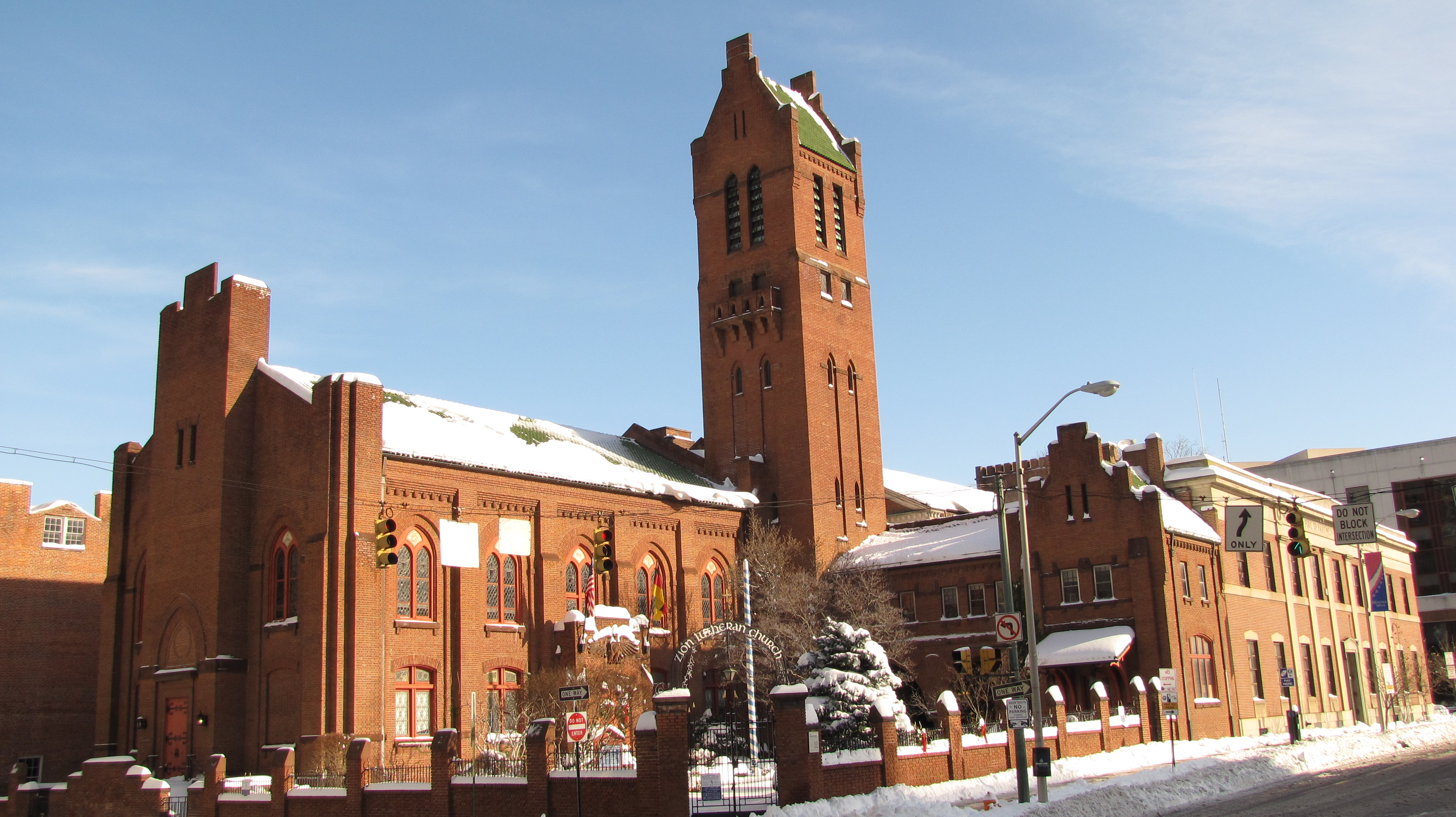
- Zion Lutheran Church in 2009
- Interactive map of Zion Lutheran Church
- Location: 400 East Lexington Street,(original bldg. facing North Gay Street), City Hall/War Memorial Plaza, Baltimore, Maryland, 21202
- Coordinates: 39°17′29.9″N 76°36′35.2″W
- Built: 1807-08 (original church, 1912-13 (western addition - "Aldersaal" [Parish House], Bell Tower, Parsonage, Gardens)
- Architects: Strobel, Johann and Saumening, Henry
- Architectural style: Georgian/Federal era - original church North German Hanseatic - western addition
- NRHP reference No.: 11000960

Significant dates
- Added to NRHP: December 30, 2011
- Designated BCL: 1977

Zion Lutheran Church, also known as the Zion Church of the City of Baltimore (formerly known as the German Lutheran Reformed Church), is a historic Evangelical Lutheran church located in downtown Baltimore, Maryland, United States, founded 1755.

== History ==
The congregation was founded in 1755 in order to serve the needs of Lutheran immigrants from Germany, as well as Germans from Pennsylvania who moved to Baltimore. It has a bilingual congregation that provides sermons in both German and English. In 1762 the congregation built its first church on Fish Street (later East Fayette Street). By 1773, a new church constitution had replaced the church's earlier core document, and eventually, the 1762 structure was also replaced by a bigger building, the current Zion Church on North Gay Street, erected from 1807 to 1808 in a Gothic style. An additional expansion of the church to the west along East Lexington Street to North Holliday Street composed of an "Adlersaal" (Parish House), bell tower, parsonage and an enclosed garden designed of Hanseatic North German architecture was constructed under Rev. Julius K. Hofmann in 1912-1913. In the late 1920s, the entire block south of the church was razed to form a monumental square (known as War Memorial Plaza or, less frequently, as "City Hall Plaza") opposite the Baltimore City Hall of 1875 on the western side and construction at the eastern end of the War Memorial Building with an auditorium, historical exhibit area and veterans organizations offices. On the south side of the church buildings facing the plaza, a new headquarters for the Baltimore City Fire Department was constructed in a Georgian-Federal style complementing the original Zion Church around the corner.

German-language sermons have been provided for over 250 years at Zion Church, the only church left in Maryland still holding weekly German-language services. The church participates in the annual Maryland German Festival and is a member of the German-American Citizens Association of Maryland.

Zion Church was listed on the National Register of Historic Places in 2011.

== People ==
The composer George Frederick Boyle was married at the church.

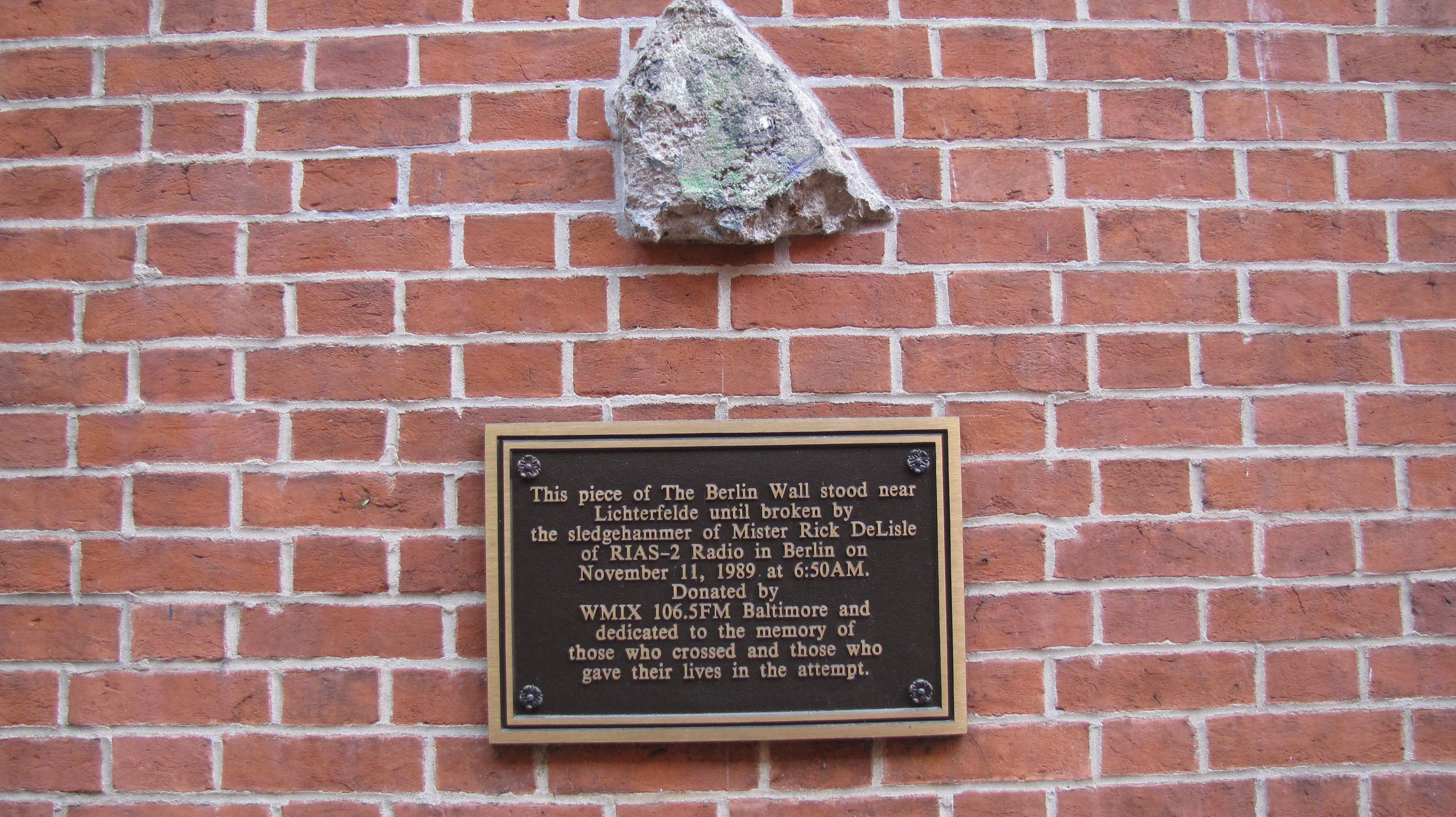
A piece of the Berlin Wall at Zion Church, Baltimore, MD.

== See also ==
- History of the Germans in Baltimore
- National Register of Historic Places listings in Central Baltimore
