= Carl Heinrich Schnauffer =

American poet, soldier, and editor

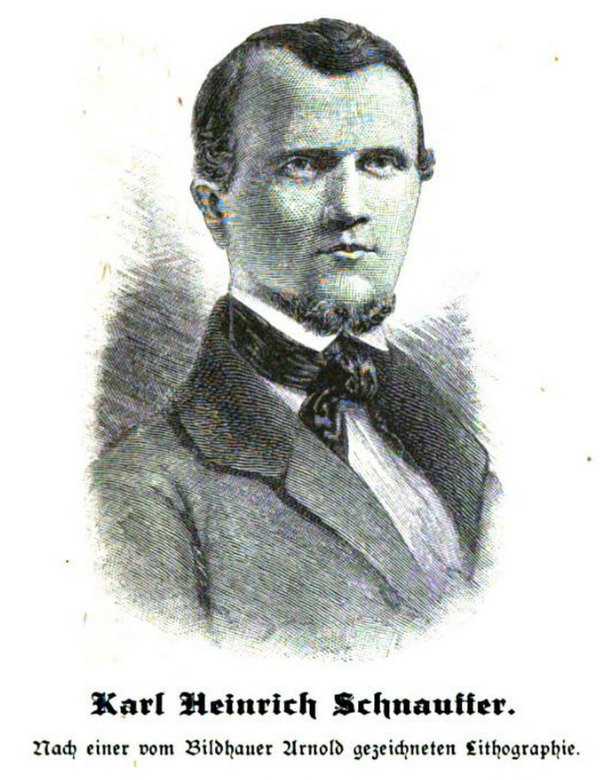
Karl Heinrich Schnauffer

Carl Heinrich Schnauffer (4 July 1823 Heimsheim - 4 September 1854 Baltimore, Maryland) was a poet, soldier and editor.

He founded the Baltimore Wecker in the fall of 1851. Before this time, he was one of the editors of the Journal in the city of Mannheim in Baden, Germany. By taking part in the German revolution of 1848-49, he was compelled to leave his native country. After he died, his widow continued the Wecker without interruption.
