= Dorguth Memorial United Methodist Church =

Historic church in Maryland, United States

- U.S. National Register of Historic Places
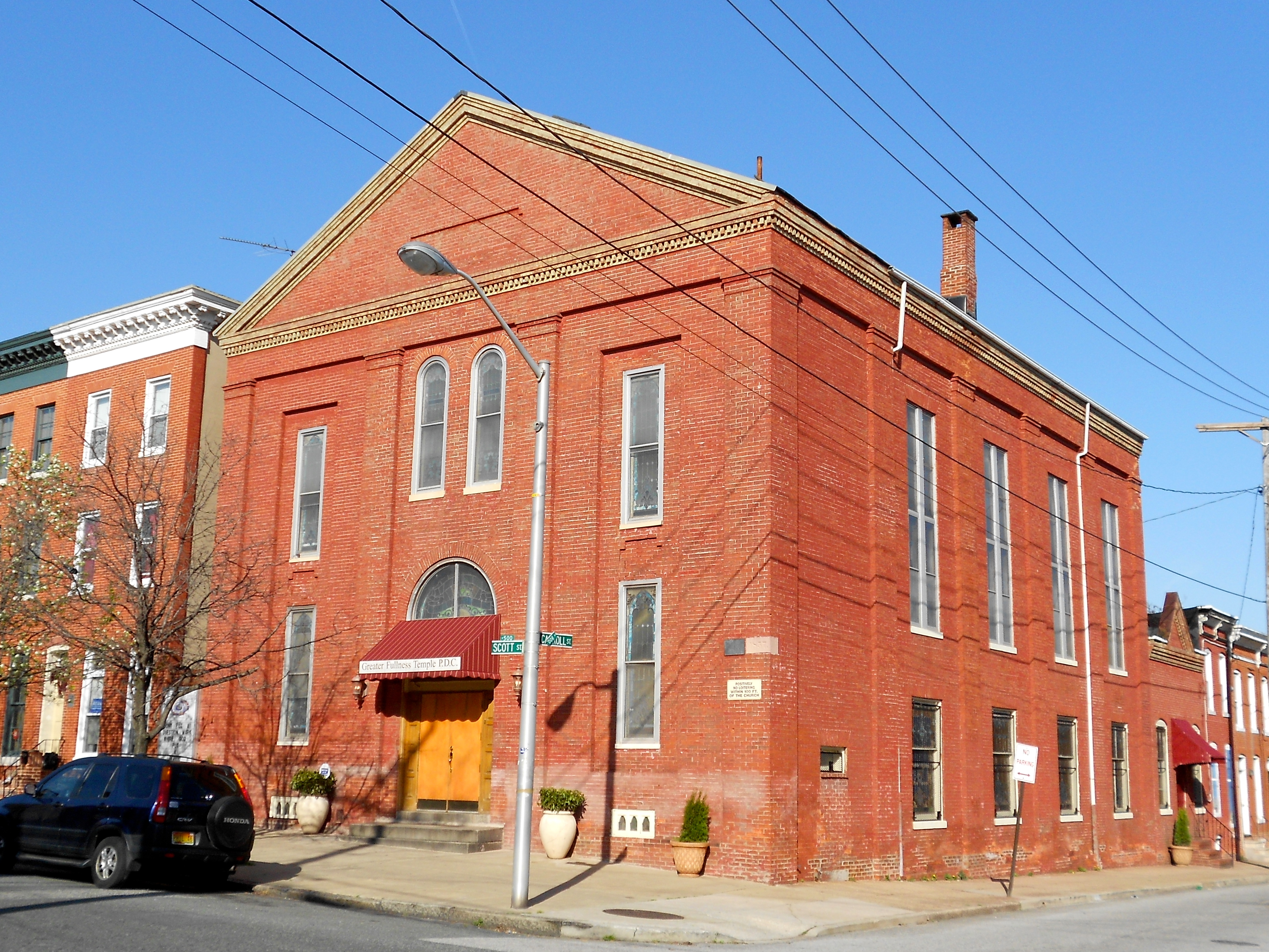
- Church in March 2012

- Location within Baltimore Location within Maryland Location within the United States
- Location: Scott and Carroll St., Baltimore, Maryland
- Coordinates: 39°16′56″N 76°37′44″W
- Area: less than one acre
- Built: 1857
- Architect: Christian Gerber
- Architectural style: Late Roman Revival
- NRHP reference No.: 79003216
- Added to NRHP: August 14, 1979

Dorguth Memorial United Methodist Church, formerly known as Otterbein Chapel Station, Scott Street United Brethren Church, Dorguth Memorial United Brethren Church, and Dorguth Memorial Evangelical United Brethren Church, is a historic United Methodist church located at Baltimore, Maryland, United States. It was built in 1857 and is a simple, two-story gable-front brick church of the late Roman Revival style. It features a gabled roof with a pedimented brick cornice. Also on the property is the parish house added in 1868. The church was named for Mrs. Frederick Dorguth, who in 1936 left money for extensive renovations. Dorguth UMC closed its doors in 2001.

Dorguth Memorial United Methodist Church was listed on the National Register of Historic Places in 1979.
