= St. Elizabeth of Hungary Catholic Church (Baltimore) =

Historic church in Maryland, United States

- St.Elizabeth
- U.S. National Register of Historic Places
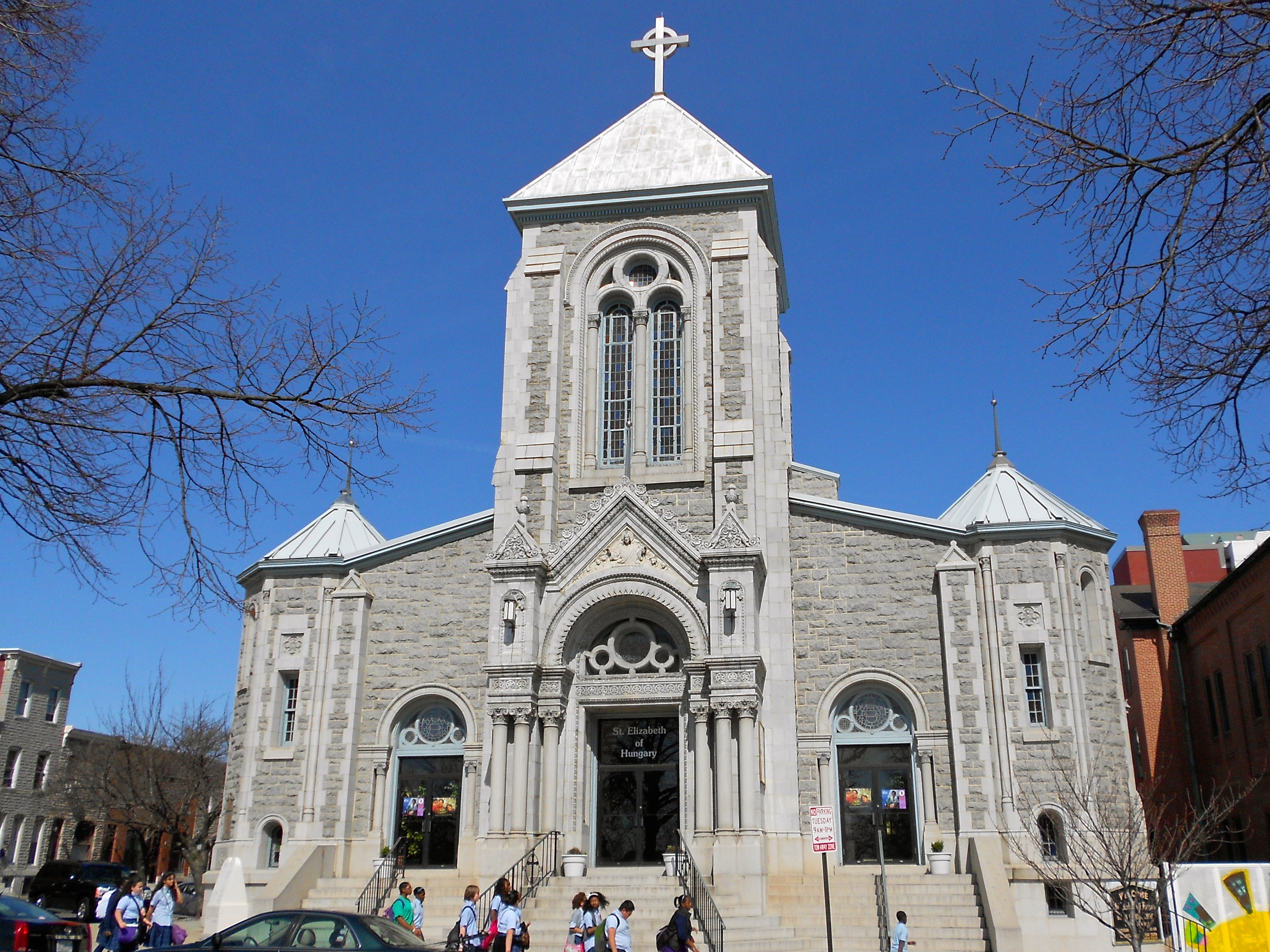
- Church building in March 2012

- Location within Baltimore Location within Maryland Location within the United States
- Location: Jct. of E. Baltimore St. and Lakewood Ave., Baltimore, Maryland
- Coordinates: 39°17′33″N 76°34′45″W
- Area: 2 acres (0.81 ha)
- Built: 1895
- Architect: Multiple
- Architectural style: Romanesque
- NRHP reference No.: 94001278
- Added to NRHP: November 4, 1994

St. Elizabeth of Hungary was a historic Roman Catholic church complex located within the Archdiocese of Baltimore in the Baltimore-Linwood neighborhood of Baltimore, Maryland, United States.

== Description ==
The complex developed over the period 1895–1926, and consists of four buildings: a two-story, gable-fronted brick structure erected in 1895 as the original church, parish hall, and rectory; a large stone Romanesque church building constructed in 1912; a three-story convent built in 1922; and a large three-story parochial school which was added to the site in 1926. The complex occupies a city block directly opposite Patterson Park. In 1931, the St. Elizabeth School had the largest student enrollment, 1,500 students, in the archdiocese. The church was founded to serve the German immigrant community in Baltimore.

St. Elizabeth of Hungary was listed on the National Register of Historic Places in 1994.

St. Elizabeth is now permanently closed.
