= August Becker (socialist) =

German-American political writer (c.1810–1875)

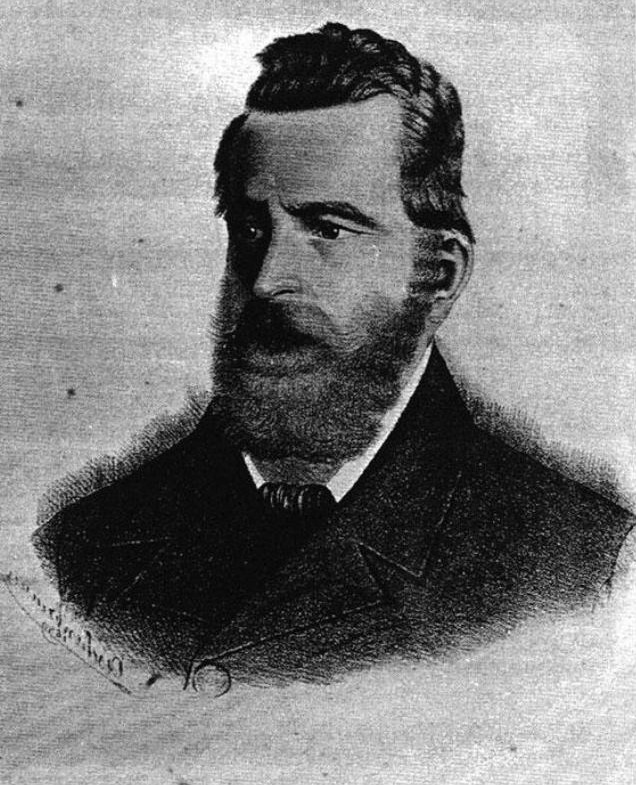
August Becker, journalist in the times of the 1848 revolution in Gießen, Germany, liberal politician

August Becker (c. 1810 – 1875) was a German political activist, politician, and journalist. Becker was a member of the legislature of the German state of Hesse. In his later years he emigrated to the United States of America, where he worked as a journalist until the time of his death.

== Biography ==
=== Early years ===
August Becker was born sometime around 1810 in Germany, the son of a clergyman. In his youth he studied theology for a brief time before being introduced to socialist ideas and turning his activity towards that realm.

=== Political career ===
Becker's political activity brought him into conflict with the law, and he was subsequently arrested and imprisoned for four years. Following his release, Becker emigrated to Geneva, Switzerland, where he published political pamphlets as well as articles for the radical press. Among those papers for which he wrote were the Rheinische Zeitung and the Vorwartz.

With the eruption of the Revolutions of 1848, Becker returned to Germany. There he published a political journal and was elected a member of the parliament for the Central German state of Hesse.

=== Emigration ===
With the fall of the 1848 revolution, the "Red '48-er" Becker emigrated to the United States of America. He ultimately moved to Cincinnati, Ohio, where he worked as a journalist until his death in 1875.
