= Grace-Hampden Methodist Episcopal Church =

Historic church in Maryland, United States

- U.S. National Register of Historic Places
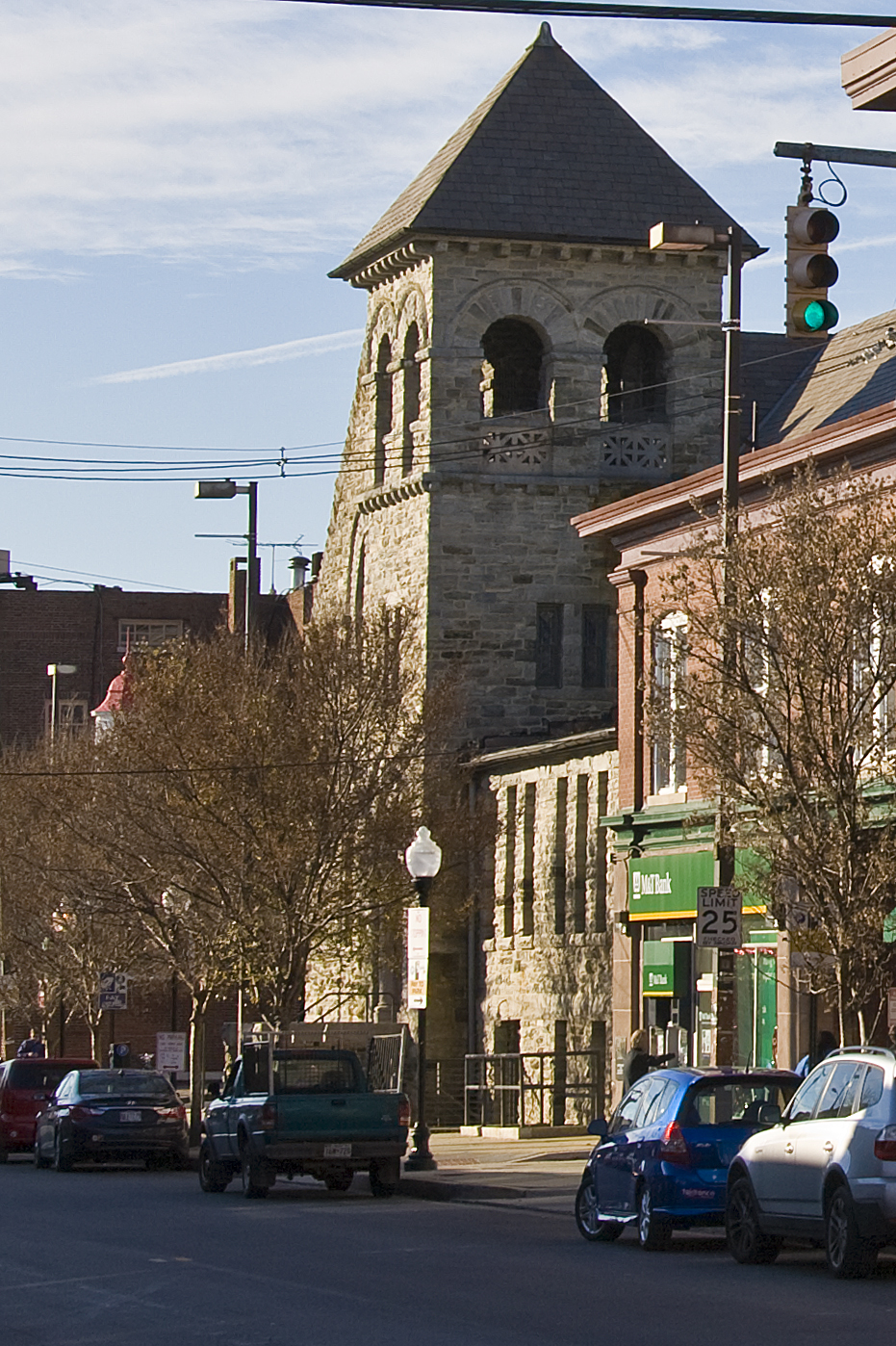

- Location within Baltimore Location within Maryland Location within the United States
- Location: 1014 W. 36th St., Baltimore, Maryland
- Coordinates: 39°19′52.46″N 76°38′01.03″W
- Area: less than one acre
- Built: 1899
- Architect: Haskell, George Clifton; Gladfelter & Chambers
- Architectural style: Romanesque
- NRHP reference No.: 01000809
- Added to NRHP: August 2, 2001

Grace-Hampden Methodist Episcopal Church is a historic Methodist Episcopal church located at Baltimore, Maryland, United States. It is a large stone building constructed in 1899. The Romanesque Revival-style church features multiple gables and a square bell tower and masonry construction utilizing local granite with round-arched openings and decorative sill and lintel courses. It was the first ecclesiastical commission of local architect George Clifton Haskell.

Grace-Hampden Methodist Episcopal Church was listed on the National Register of Historic Places in 2001.
