= Holy Cross Roman Catholic Church (Baltimore) =

Historic church in Maryland, United States

- U.S. National Register of Historic Places
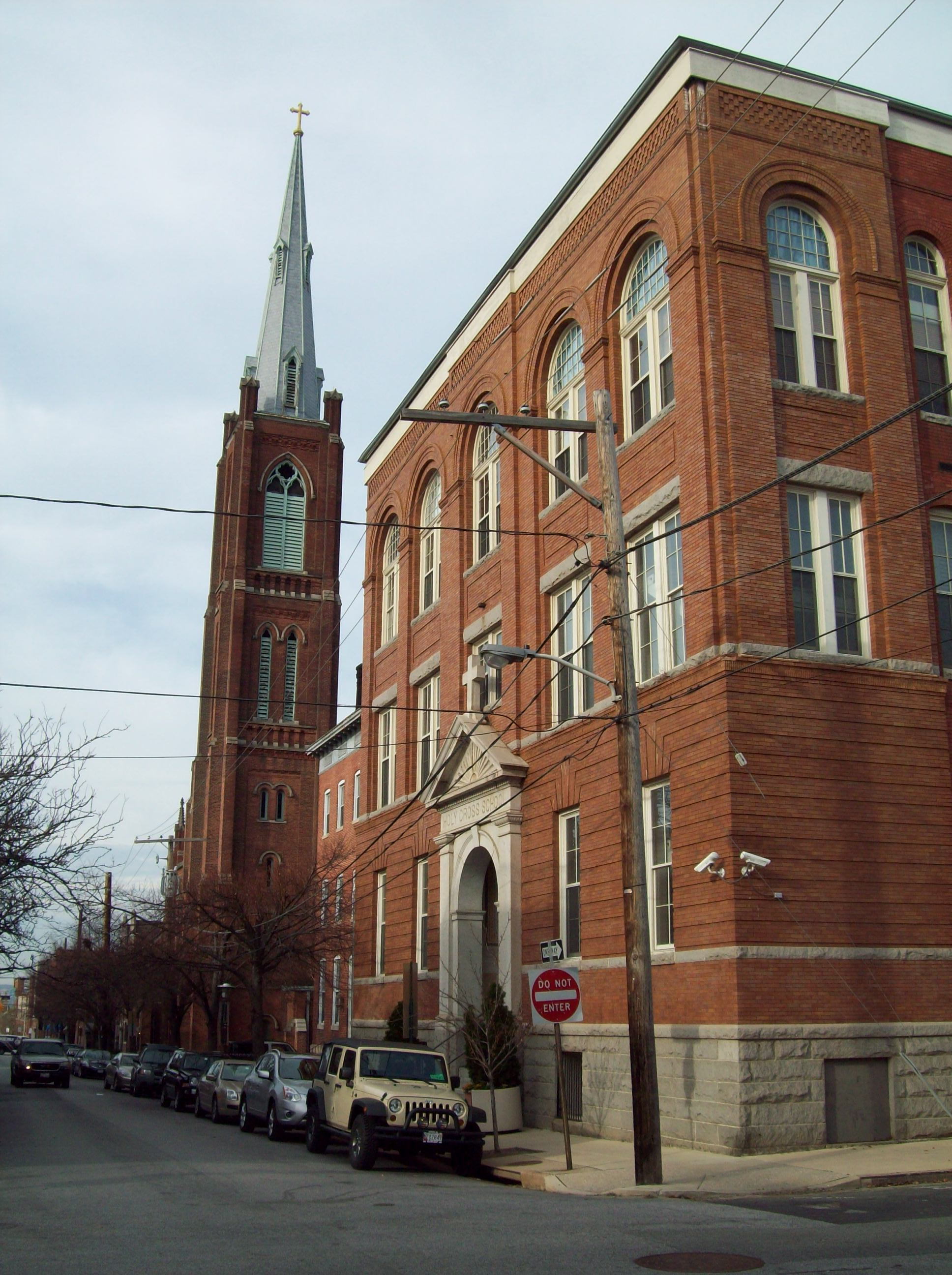
- Holy Cross Roman Catholic Church, December 2011

- Location within Baltimore Location within Maryland Location within the United States
- Location: 106-112 East West St., Baltimore, Maryland
- Coordinates: 39°16′34″N 76°36′40″W
- Area: 1 acre (0.40 ha)
- Built: 1860
- Architect: Pohl, Anton; et al.
- Architectural style: Gothic Revival, Late Victorian
- NRHP reference No.: 02001578
- Added to NRHP: December 30, 2002

Holy Cross Roman Catholic Church is a historic Roman Catholic church complex located within the Archdiocese of Baltimore in the Federal Hill neighborhood of Baltimore, Maryland, United States.

== Description ==
The complex consists of a group of four brick buildings: an 1860 Gothic Revival church (remodeled in 1885 and 1907), an 1871 Italianate rectory-convent, a 1903 Romanesque Revival school, and a 1928 Tudor Revival rectory. The church has a cruciform plan and features a 200-foot steeple composed of a 125-foot tower and a 75-foot copper-clad spire. A shallow choir loft contains the 1886 organ with its stenciled pipes. The Archdiocese listed the church as a German parish until 1959.

Holy Cross Roman Catholic Church was listed on the National Register of Historic Places in 2002.

Joseph Maskell was assigned to Holy Cross from 1982 to 1992.

== Gallery ==
A photograph of Holy Cross Church from a 1914 publication
