= National Register of Historic Places listings in South and Southeast Baltimore =

NRHP listings in South and Southeast Baltimore

The locations of the National Register properties and districts listed below (at least for all showing latitude and longitude coordinates below) may be seen in a map by clicking on "Map of all coordinates".

This National Park Service list is complete through NPS recent listings posted June 6, 2026.

Main:List of RHPs in Baltimore

== Current listings ==
	Name on the Register	Image	Date listed	Location	District	Description
1	Bagby Furniture Company Building	Bagby Furniture Company Building	October 22, 1998 (#98001263)	509 S. Exeter St. 39°17′05″N 76°36′00″W	Southeast	
2	BALTIMORE (tug)	BALTIMORE (tug)	November 4, 1993 (#93001613)	1415 Key Highway; 39°16′28″N 76°36′01″W	South	
3	Baltimore and Ohio Locust Point Grain Terminal Elevator	Baltimore and Ohio Locust Point Grain Terminal Elevator	December 23, 2004 (#04001379)	1700 Beason St. 39°16′19″N 76°35′20″W	South	
4	Baltimore and Ohio Transportation Museum and Mount Clare Station	Baltimore and Ohio Transportation Museum and Mount Clare Station	October 15, 1966 (#66000906)	Pratt and Poppleton Sts. 39°17′07″N 76°37′57″W	South	
5	BANCROFT (motor vessel)		March 27, 1980 (#80001780)	Fell's Point; 39°16′54″N 76°35′30″W	Southeast	
6	Bankard-Gunther Mansion	Bankard-Gunther Mansion	August 6, 1980 (#80001781)	2102 E. Baltimore Street; 39°17′31″N 76°35′14″W	Southeast	
7	Barre Circle Historic District	Barre Circle Historic District	January 10, 1983 (#83002926)	Roughly bounded by Scott St., Ramsey St., Boyd St., and Harbor City Boulevard./S. Fremont St. 39°17′08″N 76°37′43″W	South	
8	Building at 239 North Gay Street	Building at 239 North Gay Street	October 7, 1994 (#94001202)	239 N. Gay St. 39°17′38″N 76°36′29″W	Southeast	SW corner of Gay and Front. Iron front, Italianate style.
9	Butchers Hill Historic District	Butchers Hill Historic District	December 28, 1982 (#82001582)	Roughly bounded by Patterson Park Ave. and Fayette, Pratt, Chapel, Washington, and Chester Sts. 39°17′29″N 76°35′13″W	Southeast	
10	Canton Historic District	Canton Historic District	January 29, 1980 (#80001784)	Eastern Ave. and Waterfront, Conklin, and Chester Sts. 39°16′53″N 76°34′34″W	Southeast	
11	Carroll Mansion	Carroll Mansion	May 25, 1973 (#73002182)	800 E. Lombard St. 39°17′19″N 76°36′17″W	Southeast	
12	Carrollton Viaduct	Carrollton Viaduct	November 11, 1971 (#71001032)	Gwynn's Falls near Carroll Park; 39°16′31″N 76°39′19″W	South	
13	Chizuk Amuno Synagogue	Chizuk Amuno Synagogue	April 19, 1978 (#78003141)	27–35 Lloyd St. 39°17′24″N 76°36′04″W	Southeast	
14	Coca-Cola Baltimore Branch Factory	Coca-Cola Baltimore Branch Factory	May 4, 2001 (#01000407)	1215 E. Fort Ave. 39°16′07″N 76°35′53″W	South	
15	Douglass Place	Douglass Place	September 15, 1983 (#83004214)	516–524 S. Dallas St. 39°17′06″N 76°35′47″W	Southeast	
16	Dorguth Memorial United Methodist Church	Dorguth Memorial United Methodist Church	August 14, 1979 (#79003216)	Scott and Carroll St. 39°16′56″N 76°37′44″W	South	
17	Dundalk Historic District	Dundalk Historic District	December 8, 1983 (#83003630)	Roughly bounded by Liberty Parkway, Dunman, Willow Spring, and Sunship Rds., and Chesapeake and Patapsco Aves. 39°15′35″N 76°31′26″W	Southeast	
18	Eastern Female High School	Eastern Female High School	September 10, 1971 (#71001035)	249 Aisquith St. 39°17′40″N 76°36′06″W	Southeast	
19	Equitable Gas Works	Equitable Gas Works	December 29, 2003 (#03001322)	1401 Severn St. 39°16′31″N 76°37′56″W	South	
20	Federal Hill Historic District	Federal Hill Historic District	April 17, 1970 (#70000859)	Bounded by Baltimore Harbor and Hughes, Hanover, and Cross Sts. 39°16′44″N 76°36′36″W	South	
21	Federal Hill South Historic District	Federal Hill South Historic District	December 22, 2003 (#03001331)	Roughly bounded by Cross St., Olive St., Marshall St., Ostend St., Fort Ave., and Covington St. 39°16′33″N 76°36′39″W	South	
22	Fells Point Historic District	Fells Point Historic District	March 28, 1969 (#69000319)	Bounded on the north by Aliceanna St., on the east by Wolfe St., on the south by Baltimore Harbor, and on the west by Dallas St. 39°16′59″N 76°35′34″W	Southeast	Includes later boundary increase.
23	Flag House	Flag House	December 3, 1969 (#69000320)	844 E. Pratt St. 39°17′15″N 76°36′13″W	Southeast	
24	Fort McHenry National Monument and Historic Shrine	Fort McHenry National Monument and Historic Shrine	October 15, 1966 (#66000907)	Locust Point, at the eastern end of Fort Ave. 39°15′49″N 76°34′48″W	TBD	
25	Gay Street Historic District	Gay Street Historic District	November 21, 2003 (#03001173)	Bounded by N. Gay, Fallsway, Low and N. Exeter Sts. 39°17′35″N 76°36′26″W	Southeast	
26	Hendler Creamery	Hendler Creamery	December 20, 2007 (#07001032)	1100 E. Baltimore St. and 1107 E. Fayette St. 39°17′28″N 76°36′08″W	Southeast	
27	Holy Cross Roman Catholic Church	Holy Cross Roman Catholic Church	December 30, 2002 (#02001578)	106–112 E. West St. 39°16′34″N 76°36′40″W	South	
28	House at 9 North Front Street	House at 9 North Front Street	June 14, 1979 (#79003217)	9 N. Front St. 39°17′26″N 76°36′19″W	Southeast	
29	SS JOHN W. BROWN (Liberty Ship)	SS JOHN W. BROWN (Liberty Ship)	November 17, 1997 (#97001295)	Pier 1, Clinton St. 39°16′04″N 76°34′12″W	Southeast	
30	Johns Hopkins Hospital Complex	Johns Hopkins Hospital Complex	February 24, 1975 (#75002094)	601 N. Broadway; 39°17′50″N 76°35′37″W	Southeast	
31	Leadenhall Street Baptist Church	Leadenhall Street Baptist Church	March 16, 1979 (#79003218)	1021–1023 Leadenhall St. 39°16′38″N 76°37′03″W	South	
32	Little Montgomery Street Historic District	Little Montgomery Street Historic District	April 15, 1982 (#82004748)	W. Montgomery and Leadenhall Sts. 39°16′48″N 76°37′00″W	South	
33	Lloyd Street Synagogue	Lloyd Street Synagogue	April 19, 1978 (#78003142)	11 Lloyd St. 39°17′26″N 76°36′05″W	Southeast	A part of the Jewish Museum of Maryland.
34	Locust Point Historic District	Locust Point Historic District	December 26, 2012 (#12001084)	Roughly bounded by Fort Ave., B & O RR., Woodall & Reynolds Sts. 39°16′13″N 76°35′35″W	South	
35	Loft Historic District North	Loft Historic District North	January 3, 1985 (#85000016)	Roughly bounded by Paca, Redwood, Eutaw, and Lombard Sts. 39°17′18″N 76°37′19″W	South	
36	Loft Historic District South	Loft Historic District South	January 3, 1985 (#85000017)	Along the 500 block of W. Pratt St., bounded by Green St. and the 100 block of S. Paca St. 39°17′10″N 76°37′23″W	South	
37	Lord Baltimore Hotel	Lord Baltimore Hotel	December 2, 1982 (#82001587)	20 West Baltimore St. 39°17′23″N 76°36′58″W	South	
38	Maryland White Lead Works	Maryland White Lead Works	December 27, 2002 (#02001604)	921–979 E. Fort Ave. 39°16′14″N 76°36′04″W	South	
39	McKim's School	McKim's School	March 30, 1973 (#73002190)	1120 E. Baltimore St. 39°17′28″N 76°36′04″W	Southeast	McKim Community Center
40	H.L. Mencken House	H.L. Mencken House	July 28, 1983 (#83004384)	1524 Hollins Rd. 39°17′15″N 76°38′29″W	South	
41	Montgomery Ward Warehouse and Retail Store	Montgomery Ward Warehouse and Retail Store	September 14, 2000 (#00001085)	1000 S. Monroe St. 39°16′34″N 76°38′41″W	South	
42	Mount Auburn Cemetery	Mount Auburn Cemetery	September 7, 2001 (#01000456)	2614 Annapolis Rd. 39°15′34″N 76°38′23″W	South	
43	Mount Clare	Mount Clare	April 15, 1970 (#70000860)	Carroll Park; 39°16′44″N 76°38′37″W	South	
44	National Brewing Company	National Brewing Company	December 30, 2002 (#02001579)	3601–3901 Dillon St. 39°16′51″N 76°33′53″W	Southeast	
45	National Enameling and Stamping Company	National Enameling and Stamping Company	December 27, 2002 (#02001583)	1901 Light St. 39°16′04″N 76°36′38″W	South	
46	Old Town Friends' Meetinghouse	Old Town Friends' Meetinghouse	March 30, 1973 (#73002192)	1201 E. Fayette St. 39°17′31″N 76°36′04″W	Southeast	
47	Parker Metal Decoration Company Plant	Parker Metal Decoration Company Plant	November 22, 2000 (#00001391)	333 W. Ostend St. 39°16′31″N 76°37′18″W	South	
48	Patterson Park-Highlandtown Historic District	Patterson Park-Highlandtown Historic District	December 27, 2002 (#02001623)	Roughly bounded by Patterson Park Ave., E. Fayette St., and Pulaski Highway, Grundy St., Eastern Ave., Patterson Park; 39°17′30″N 76°34′23″W	Southeast	
49	Pigtown Historic District	Pigtown Historic District	December 28, 2006 (#06001177)	Roughly bounded by McHenry St. and Ramsay St., W. Barre, S. Paca, Ostend and Wicomico Sts., Bush and Bayard Sts, and the railroad line 39°16′49″N 76°37′56″W	South	
50	Polish Home Hall	Polish Home Hall	December 26, 2007 (#07001311)	4416 Fairhaven Ave. 39°13′31″N 76°35′25″W	South	
51	Poppleton Fire Station	Poppleton Fire Station	September 8, 1983 (#83002938)	756–760 W. Baltimore St. 39°17′20″N 76°37′44″W	South	
52	Procter and Gamble Baltimore Plant	Procter and Gamble Baltimore Plant	October 28, 1999 (#99001280)	1422 Nicholson St. 39°16′30″N 76°35′30″W	South	
53	Public School No. 25	Public School No. 25	September 25, 1979 (#79001111)	S. Bond St. 39°17′06″N 76°35′43″W	Southeast	
54	Ridgely's Delight Historic District	Ridgely's Delight Historic District	June 6, 1980 (#80001790)	Roughly bounded by S. Fremont Ave. and W. Pratt, Conway, and Russell Sts. 39°17′08″N 76°37′31″W	South	
55	Riverside Historic District	Riverside Historic District	April 30, 2008 (#08000358)	Bounded by Race St. from the west, south to Winder, east to Webster, north to Heath, east to Boyle and north to Fort, then west to Marshall; 39°16′13″N 76°36′33″W	South	
56	Rombro Building	Rombro Building	May 26, 2005 (#94001172)	22–24 S. Howard St. 39°17′18″N 76°37′12″W	South	
57	St. Alphonsus' Church, Rectory, Convent and Halle	St. Alphonsus' Church, Rectory, Convent and Halle	May 23, 1973 (#73002195)	112–116, 125–127 W. Saratoga St. 39°17′35″N 76°37′04″W	Southeast	
58	St. Brigid's School and Convent	St. Brigid's School and Convent	December 27, 2016 (#16000909)	900 S. East Ave. 39°16′56″N 76°34′17″W		
59	St. Elizabeth of Hungary	St. Elizabeth of Hungary	November 4, 1994 (#94001278)	Junction of E. Baltimore St. and Lakewood Ave. 39°17′33″N 76°34′45″W	Southeast	
60	St. Leo's Church	St. Leo's Church	July 28, 1983 (#83002939)	221 S. Exeter St. 39°17′15″N 76°36′03″W	Southeast	
61	St. Michael's Church Complex	St. Michael's Church Complex	May 17, 1989 (#89000383)	1900–1920 E. Lombard St. 39°17′26″N 76°35′24″W	Southeast	
62	St. Paul's Cemetery	St. Paul's Cemetery	June 30, 1988 (#88000746)	Redwood St. and Martin Luther King Boulevard; 39°17′15″N 76°37′41″W	South	
63	St. Peter the Apostle Church and Buildings	St. Peter the Apostle Church and Buildings	October 14, 1976 (#76002184)	11 and 13 S. Poppleton St. and 848 Hollins St. 39°17′17″N 76°37′56″W	South	
64	St. Vincent De Paul Roman Catholic Church	St. Vincent De Paul Roman Catholic Church	February 12, 1974 (#74002215)	120 N. Front St. 39°17′29″N 76°36′24″W	Southeast	
65	SAVANNAH (nuclear ship)	SAVANNAH (nuclear ship)	November 14, 1982 (#82001518)	Patapsco River, Port of Baltimore; 39°15′31″N 76°33′20″W	South	Previously in York County, Virginia
66	Shot Tower	Shot Tower	October 1, 1969 (#69000373)	Southeastern corner of Fayette and Front Sts. 39°17′26″N 76°36′20″W	Southeast	Also known as Phoenix Shot Tower.
67	School No. 27 (Commodore John Rodgers Elementary School)	School No. 27 (Commodore John Rodgers Elementary School)	March 21, 1986 (#86000613)	2031 E. Fayette St. 39°17′38″N 76°35′16″W	Southeast	
68	Sonneborn Building	Sonneborn Building	October 29, 1982 (#82001588)	110 S. Paca St. 39°17′11″N 76°37′21″W	South	
69	South Central Avenue Historic District	South Central Avenue Historic District	November 11, 2001 (#01001213)	Approximately 8 blocks centering on Central Ave. between Pratt and Fleet Sts. 39°17′12″N 76°35′58″W	Southeast	
70	Southern District Police Station	Southern District Police Station	December 28, 2001 (#01001373)	28 E. Ostend St. 39°16′30″N 76°36′47″W	South	
71	Turner-White Casket Co. Building	Turner-White Casket Co. Building	January 26, 1995 (#94001553)	509–511 W. Lombard St. 39°17′14″N 76°37′21″W	South	
72	U.S. Post Office and Courthouse	U.S. Post Office and Courthouse	March 25, 1977 (#77001530)	111 N. Calvert St. 39°17′27″N 76°36′44″W	South	
73	Union Bros. Furniture Company		February 7, 2018 (#100001959)	1120 S Hanover St. 39°16′34″N 76°36′57″W		
74	Union Square-Hollins Market Historic District	Union Square-Hollins Market Historic District	September 15, 1983 (#83002941)	Roughly bounded by Fulton, Fayette, Pratt, and Schroeder Sts. 39°17′13″N 76°38′25″W	South	See Union Square and Hollins Market
75	WHEC-37	WHEC-37	June 7, 1988 (#88001826)	Pier 6; 39°17′09″N 76°36′23″W	South	
76	Walters Bath No. 2	Walters Bath No. 2	June 19, 1979 (#79003220)	900 Washington Boulevard; 39°16′59″N 76°37′52″W	South	
77	Wilkens-Robins Building	Wilkens-Robins Building	December 3, 1980 (#80001792)	308–312 W. Pratt St. 39°17′11″N 76°37′12″W	South	

== See also ==
- National Register of Historic Places listings in Maryland
