= Faultless Pajama Company =

Garment manufacturer that began operation in 1881

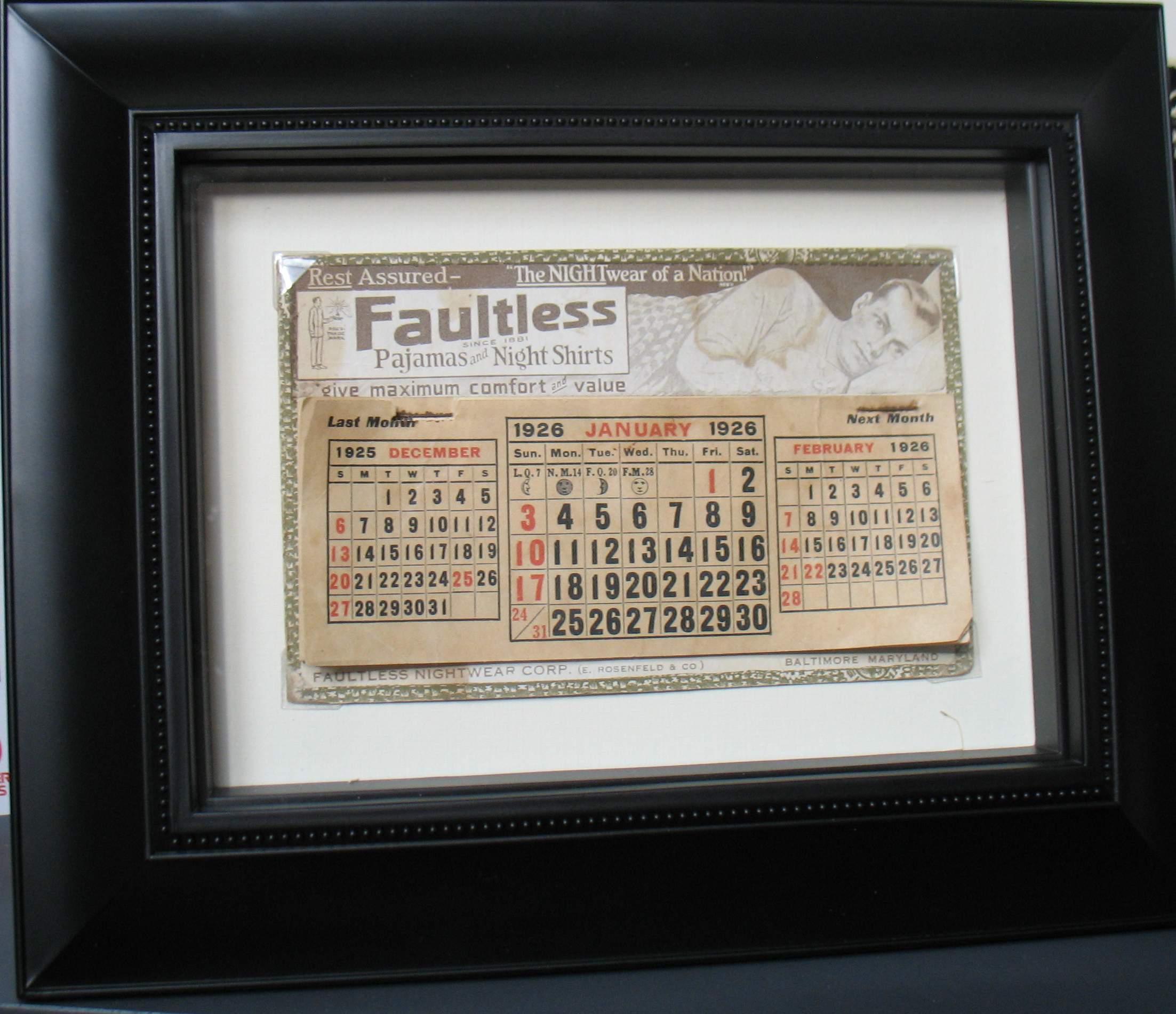
A 1926 calendar advertising Faultless Pajamas, showing the slogan "The Nightwear of a Nation".

The Faultless Pajama Company, originally E. Rosenfeld and Company and then the Rosenfeld & Steppacher Company, was a Baltimore-based garment manufacturer that began operation in 1881. The factory was located in downtown Baltimore, on the corner of South Paca and Lombard Streets, in what is now referred to as the Westside. It was one of the Baltimore garment industry's major employers.

The company mostly manufactured pajamas and nightwear, leading to their slogan, "The Nightwear of a Nation". They were the first manufacturer to use elastic in the waist of pajama pants, rather than drawstrings or belts.

The company was best known at the time for its jingle "My Faultless Pajama Girl". This piece, a fox-trot, was composed by Louis Fisher in 1917. Sheet music was published by Jerome H Remick & Co.

The company was sold to fellow garment manufacturer Wilson Brothers in the 1940s. Wilson Brothers continued to produce pajamas under the Faultless Pajama name in addition to their own Wilson Wear line.

== Location ==
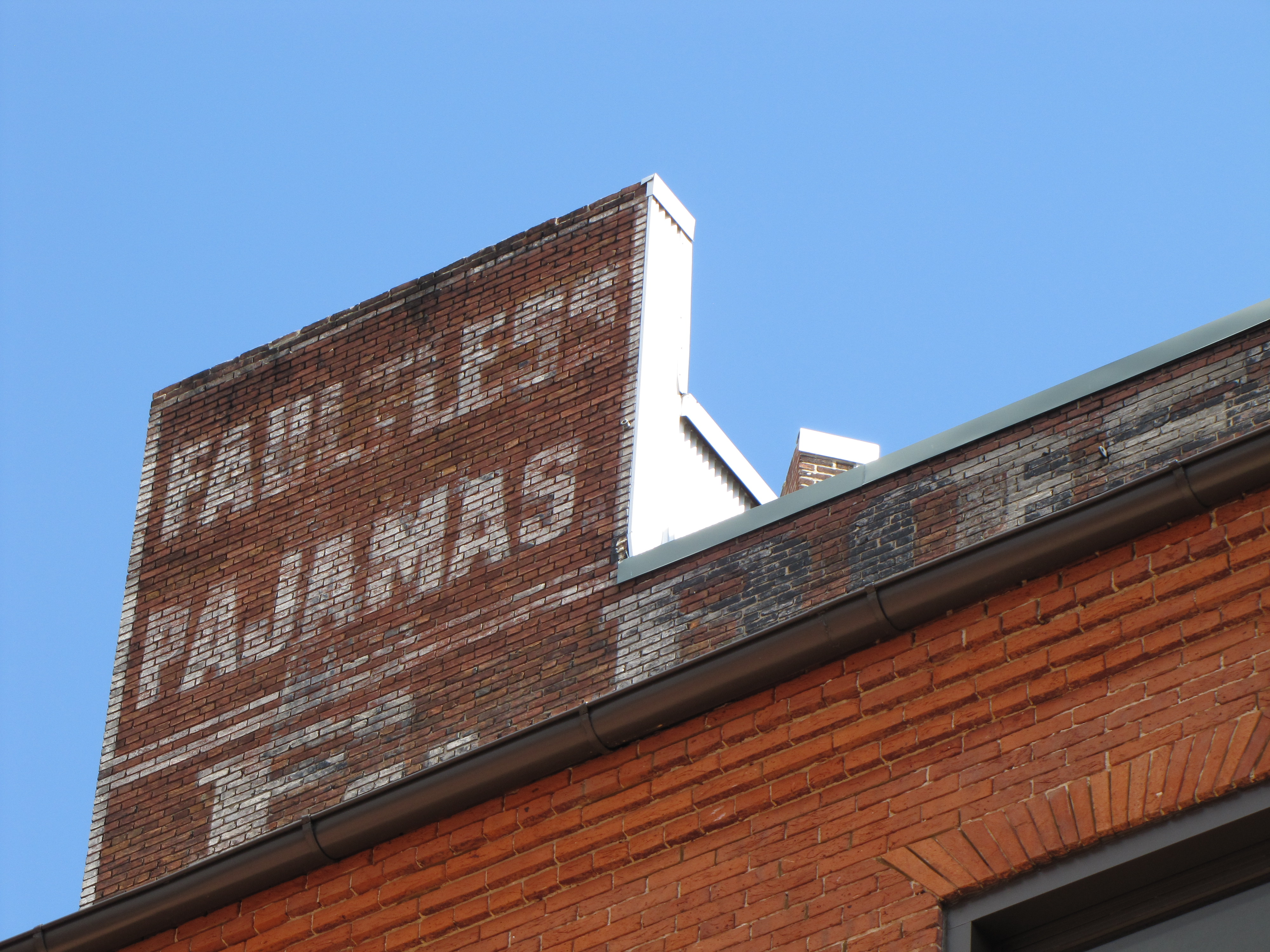
The back of the Rosenfeld building, showing a painted-brick ad for the Faultless Pajama Company. The first letters of "E. Rosenfeld and Company" are visible beneath.

The building in which the company was located is part of the Loft Historic District North, and was listed on the National Register of Historic Places in 1985 as the Rosenfeld Building. The building was converted to loft-style apartments in the 1980s and is currently known as the Inner Harbor Loft Apartments. It was sold to 36 S Paca St LLC, a wholly owned subsidiary of the University of Maryland Medical Center, in 2005, and now serves as a mixed-purpose building, providing university housing, long-term patient family housing, and commercial rental.
