= Bartlett-Hayward Company =

Former American metalworking company

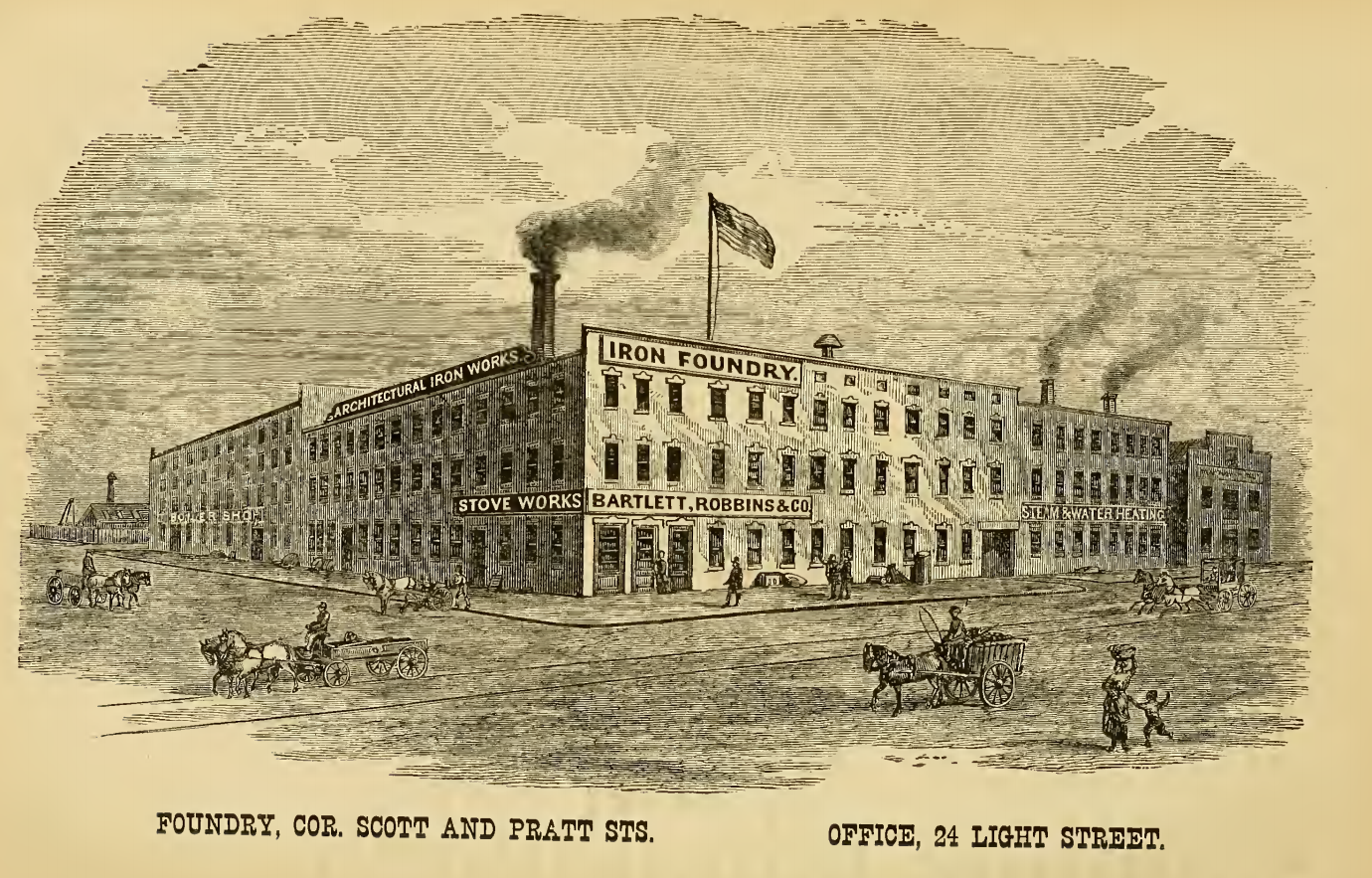
- Lithograph ca. 1873
- Type: Private
- Industry: Metalworking
- Founded: 1837; 189 years ago
- Founder: George M. Hayward
- Defunct: approx. 1980
- Successor: Koppers
- Headquarters: Baltimore, Maryland, United States

Bartlett-Hayward Company was an American metalworking company with large foundry, fabrication, and construction business lines, located in Baltimore, Maryland. Founded in the 1830s, it was independent until 1925 and since 1927 was owned by Koppers, of which it remained a division long afterward.

The company engaged initially in the production of Latrobe stoves, but by the end of the nineteenth century, its Pigtown complex was the largest iron foundry in the United States, with a diverse output including cast-iron architecture, steam heating equipment, machine parts, railroad engines and piston rings.

During the peak of cast-iron architecture in the nineteenth century, the company was well known for its ornate building façades, which were shipped nationally. Among their notable projects were their contributions to the Sun Iron Building (1851) in Baltimore and the Harper Brothers Building (1854) in New York City, together credited as among the first major iron-front buildings in the United States.

In the late nineteenth and early twentieth centuries, Bartlett-Hayward expanded to become the country's largest producer of gas holders, sending ironworkers far and wide to erect them, mostly for municipal and industrial gasworks.

During World War I, the company made munitions, ship propellers, and other materiel for the United States and its allies. It made millions of artillery shells and the artillery fuzes for them (9.6 million shells in World War I). It designed new fuze models and designed improved processes for making those shells.

The company was acquired by McClintic-Marshall Construction Company in 1925, then sold to Koppers Company in 1927. It was absorbed as a directly owned division of Koppers in 1936.

During World War II, it did not resume artillery shell production (which was handled by other companies) but instead built carriages for antiaircraft artillery (the M3 carriage for the 37 mm gun M1 and the carriage for the 40 mm Bofors gun), naval aircraft catapults, aircraft propellers, and other materiel.

The West Baltimore facility remained open as the home of the Koppers division until the firm left the city about 1980.

== Name ==
Bartlett-Hayward is the most common name for the company; however, the firm used several names during its existence:

- Hayward and Friend, 1837–1840, stovemakers
- Hayward and Company, 1840–1848, stovemakers
- Hayward, Bartlett and Company, 1848–1866, stovefounders, plumbers, architectural iron works, locomotive boilers, steam and hot water works
- Bartlett, Robbins and Company, 1866–1878, founders, stoves, architectural iron works, heating apparatus
- Bartlett, Hayward and Company, 1878–1909, founders and engineers
- The Bartlett-Hayward Company, 1909–1936, founders, machinists, and engineers
- Koppers Company, Bartlett-Hayward Division, 1936- engineers, manufacturers and contractors.

== History ==
=== Foundation ===
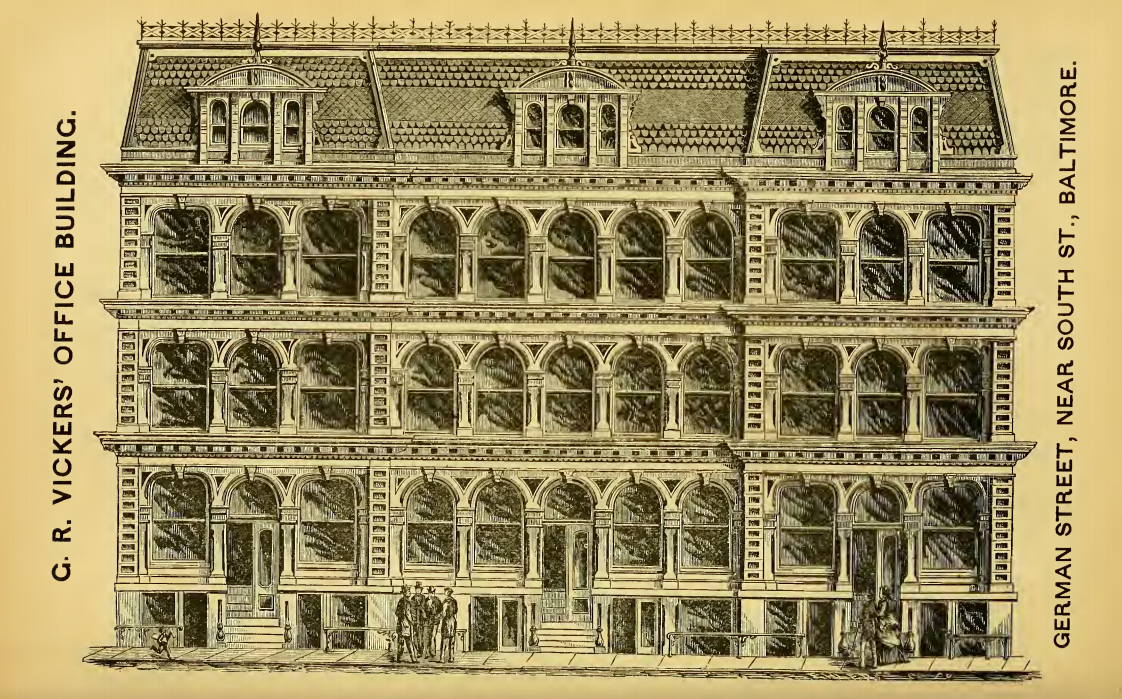
Bartlett-Hayward built the iron exterior of the 'Old' G. R. Vickers Building in 1854

Bartlett-Hayward's origins began in 1832, when George M. Hayward moved from New Hampshire and established himself in the stove business in Baltimore. Five years later, in 1837, his brother Jonas Hutchinson Hayward joined him in the city to share in the business. The brothers partnered with Alfred F. Friend establishing a firm at the corner of Light and Mercer Streets under the name Hayward & Friend.

In 1838, George Hayward returned to New Hampshire and left the firm (along with Friend). Two years later, in 1840, Jonas Hayward reformed it with the addition of his elder brother Nehemiah Hayward and a new partner, Samuel Blanchard, under the name Hayward & Company. At this point, the company, lacking a foundry of its own, received its iron from Harford County, around Jarrettsville, Maryland. In 1846 Hayward and Company purchased the Latrobe Stove Foundries and pioneered in the national marketing of the "Latrobe" or "Baltimore" stove. According to a 1917 estimate, the company ultimately produced over 300,000 of them.

Separately, David Lewis Bartlett, another manufacturer from New England, moved to Baltimore around 1844, and established a stove foundry, first on President Street and later (in 1849) on Leadenhall Street. Shortly after Hayward & Company's merger with the Latrobe Foundry, Bartlett also joined the partnership. Consequently, the firm became known as Hayward, Bartlett and Company. The firm was by this time completely owned by the Bartletts and Haywards, Samuel Blanchard having withdrawn in 1842.

=== Expansion to iron architecture ===
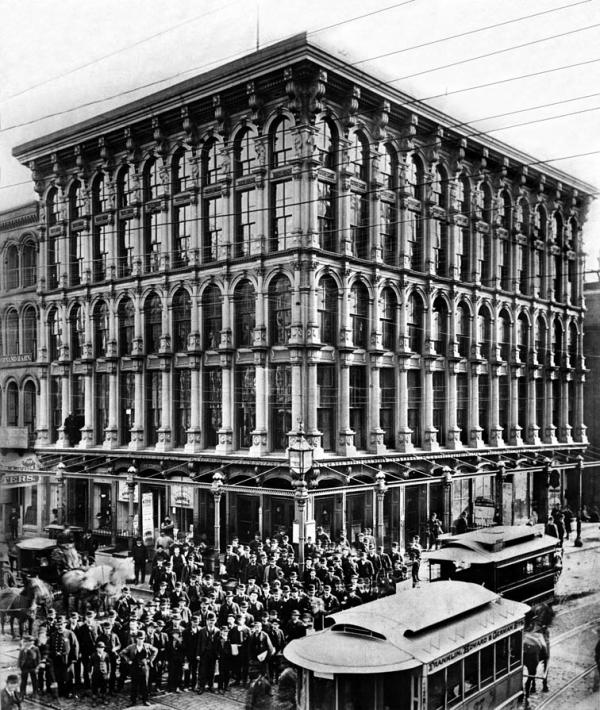
The Sun Iron Building - photo ca. 1880-1890

In 1850, New York architect James Bogardus was hired by Baltimore Sun founder A.S. Abell to build a new headquarters for the newspaper, using the then-novel technique of cast-iron fronts. While Bogardus preferred to use other, New York-based foundries with whom he had prior relationships for the actual exterior ironwork, Hayward & Bartlett was commissioned to cast the building's steam heating and plumbing systems. Within a few years however, the company was well known for producing architectural fronts of its own. One of its most notable early works came in 1854 when the company built the cast-iron façade of Harper & Bros. Building in New York, considered a "masterpiece of the style."

In 1851, Hayward & Bartlett increased its production space, constructing a large, four-story warehouse in the cast-iron style for which they were becoming known, at Light and Mercer streets and adjacent to their existing offices. By 1852, Hayward & Bartlett obtained a large piece of property at the corner of Pratt and Scott Streets near the Mount Clare Shops of the Baltimore and Ohio Railroad, which put the company in a strategic position to supply the new railroad. At this site they built a huge new plant including warehouses, workshops and foundries. At this expanded site, two large cast-iron Newfoundland dogs were built and placed at the entrance. Named "Sailor" and "Canton," these two dogs became famous symbols of the company, and would be displayed until the company's final closure more than a century later.

In 1853, the company took a third partner, Horace W. Robbins, a New Englander (like all of the previous partners) who had been operating in Baltimore since the late 1840s. The next year, the company spun off its retail stove business to another company, Collins & Co., deciding to focus solely on the foundry and ironworking business proper. One of the company's most unique works at this time was the elaborate 1853 heating system for the Thomas Winans mansion "Alexandroffsky", which utilized 20,000 square feet of heating coils under the floors of twenty buildings.

As cast-iron-front warehouses became increasingly popular by the mid-1850s, the company cast many such fronts (especially in Downtown Baltimore), including a contract via James Bogardus for ten warehouses in New York in 1856. Hayward & Bartlett also supplied cast-iron fixtures for affluent homes near Mount Vernon and along Charles Street. The company created the doors, window frames and columns of the tower for the Church of the Epiphany in Washington, D.C. in 1858. It was also commissioned to produce the iron work for the B&O Railroad's Camden Station.

Even as iron buildings continued to be lucrative, Hayward & Bartlett diversified its production, such as when the company began producing iron lighthouses, two of which were exported to Texas in 1858. The company also began contesting and winning national government contracts, such as for the iron work in the Alexandria Custom House and Post Office in 1856, and the Charleston Custom House in 1857. The company's work in heating systems continued, with a contract to outfit the Maryland State House in 1859. Hayward & Bartlett's experience with monumental iron works grew, as it cast what were reported as some of the largest girders in the world as part of the construction of the Peabody Institute in 1860. Demonstrating their continuing prosperity, a single report in The Sun from September of the same year described how the company had just built two large new factories at their Pratt & Scott street location, and were simultaneously completing five warehouses fronts for Petersburg, Virginia, two fronts bound for Washington, D.C., and "several massive iron doors" for a county in Georgia.

=== Civil War munitions and locomotives ===
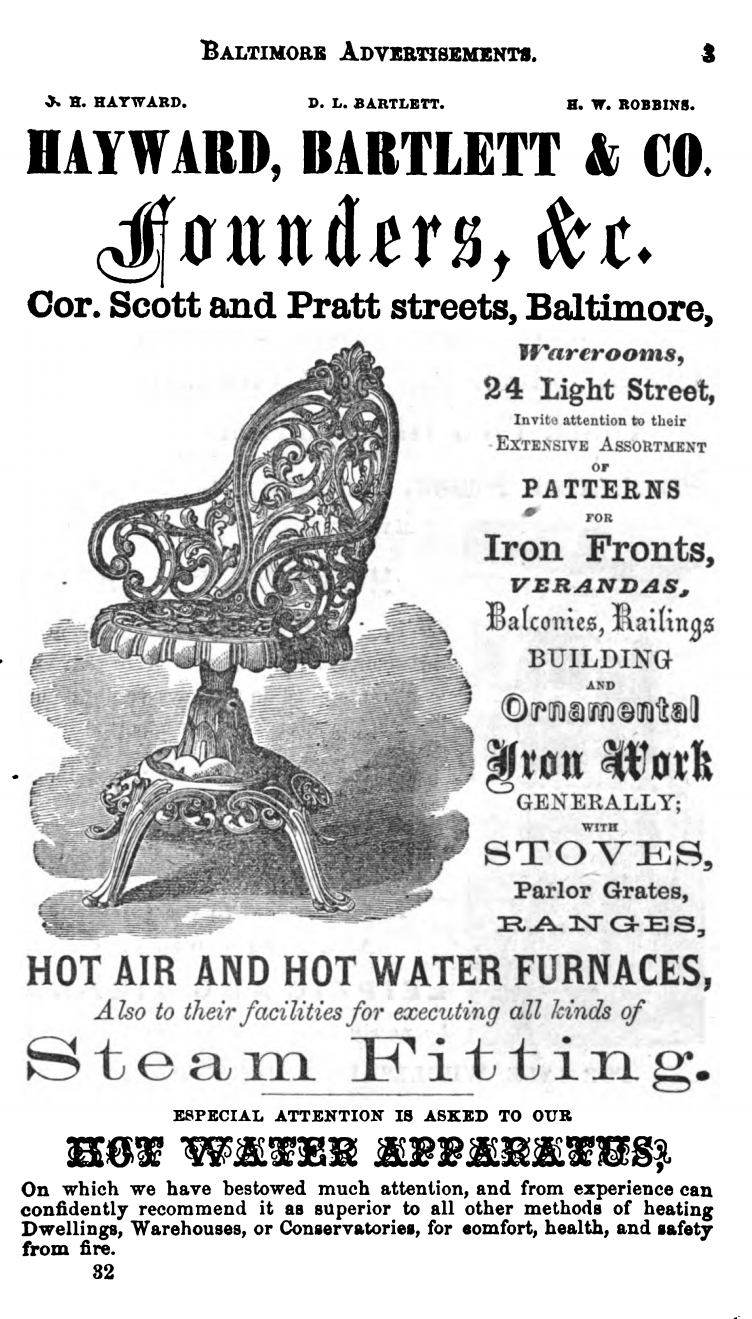
Hayward, Bartlett & Co. advertisement circa 1860 - showing the company's diverse iron products

When the American Civil War broke out, the company provided round shrapnel for the Union Army. However, the company downplayed its participation in supplying one side over the other, owing to the delicate position of Baltimore between North and South (a tension which had recently exploded in the Baltimore riot of 1861), as well as the company's commercial entanglements with Southern governments, such as for the construction of the South Carolina State House, which Hayward & Bartlett had secured contract for in 1848, and would resume the construction of after the war's conclusion.

At the outset of the war, Ross Winans, the owner of the Winans Locomotives Works was arrested and imprisoned for attempting to provide support to the Confederacy. With its owner imprisoned for the duration of the war, in 1863 the Winans yards were leased by Hayward, Bartlett & Co., who began producing railroad engines there under the name "Baltimore Locomotive Works." With these extra workshops, the company's footprint in west Baltimore was increased about another four acres. In the course of its ownership of the yard, Hayward & Bartlett completed three Winans locomotives already under construction, in addition to building or reconstructing an additional 25 engines. The company continued to operate the locomotive yards until 1867. The three Winans engines are notable as the last camelback locomotives to be put into service by the Baltimore & Ohio Railroad. Aside from the B&O, engines produced by the Baltimore Locomotive Works in this period saw service on other lines including the Cumberland & Pennsylvania Railroad and the Western Maryland Railroad. After 1867, when Bartlett, Robbins & Co. left the locomotive business, the Winans shops were razed and the area sold for other purposes.

At the death of Jonas H. Hayward in 1866, the company changed its name to Bartlett, Robbins & Co., with David L. Bartlett assuming the role of senior partner and Howard W. Robbins the junior. In the immediate aftermath of the war, the company produced iron-front buildings in the rebuilding South, such as the large Stearns Iron-Front Building in Richmond, Virginia. In the late 1860s, Bartlett & Robbins produced the iron dome of Baltimore City Hall. The company also built iron fronts and shutters for numerous Baltimore industrial buildings, a portico for the Baltimore Basilica and an iron balcony for Barnum's Hotel in Baltimore. The company contributed interior metalwork for the Washington Monument. It also supplied much of the metalwork for the Treasury Building in Washington, D.C.

=== Post–Civil War gas industry ===
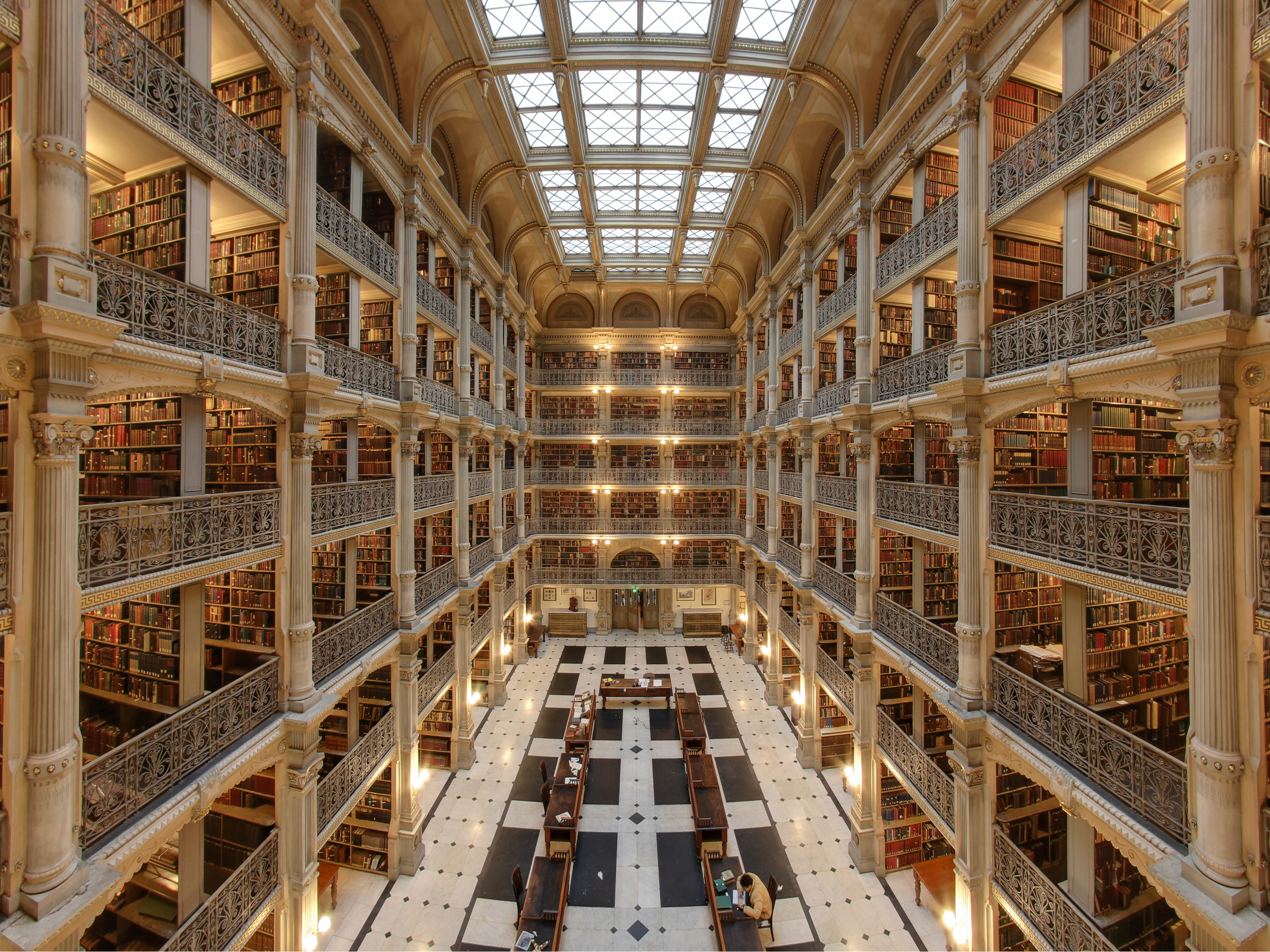
Bartlett Hayward produced the intricate railings of the George Peabody Library

By the 1870s, Bartlett & Robbins was the largest iron foundry in the United States, employing between 500 and 1000 people at any given time. The company at this time produced the elaborate cast-iron interior and railings of the George Peabody Library in Mount Vernon. In 1871, the company supplied the cast-iron exterior for the Grand Opera House in Wilmington, Delaware. It also supplied the architectural ironwork of the United States Capitol. Many of the company's cast-iron building façades were designed by English architect George H. Johnson (who also designed listed landmarks including the Haughwout Building in New York City), such as the extant structure at 322 W Baltimore St.

In 1871, the company built the cast-iron façade of the Wilkens–Robins Building at 308 W Pratt Street, listed on the National Register of Historic Places. In 1873, the Baltimore News-American building was built by Bartlett & Robbins across South Street from the Sun Iron Building. In addition to its stoves, heating systems and iron architectural work, the company continued to diversify its products in this period, beginning to produce gas lighting fixtures. It also produced brewing and distilling equipment. An advertisement from the time period shows how extensive the catalog of cast-iron products available had become, including: "walls, floors, doors, windows, roof, porticoes, balconies, cornices, vaults, ventilators, fences, gates, fountains, vases, statuary, chairs, settees, gas and water fixtures, a heating apparatus, ranges or cooking stoves, parlor stoves, grates, brackets, stable fixtures, iron pavements, pots and kettles, culinary implements, bedsteads, in fact everything except beds and bedding, and science will doubtless ere long find some means of remedying this apparent difficulty." In the 1870s, Hayward & Robbins moved an increasingly large amount of its business into the nascent gas holder industry. Senior partner David L. Bartlett became president of a new company, the Consumer's Mutual Gas Light Company of Baltimore, and Hayward & Robbins was contracted to build its plant. The company's earliest gas holders made use of the ornate architectural column molds that had been designed for their earlier commercial architecture. Over the next decade, they would build over 100 gas holders, for clients as far away as Caracas and Havana.

Horace W. Robbins died of illness on August 12, 1878, leaving David Bartlett the sole partner. Two years later, in 1880, Thomas J. Hayward bought out the interest of the late Robbins and joined the company as a partner, leading to its renaming again as Bartlett, Hayward & Co. Edward L. Bartlett, David Bartlett's son, was also made a partner in the company in the same year. By 1889, the shops near Mount Clare had expanded even further. Around this time, Bartlett, Hayward & Co. obtained several major national contracts, producing the heating and cooling systems for Johns Hopkins Hospital, New York Post Office, the New Orleans Custom House and the San Francisco Mint. In 1899, David L. Bartlett died, and Edward Bartlett assumed his father's role as Senior Partner.

=== Public incorporation and acquisition ===
The Great Baltimore Fire of 1904 destroyed or led to the razing of many of Baltimore's iron-front buildings. Several downtown buildings however avoided total destruction owing in part to protection from their Bartlett & Hayward-produced iron shutters, including the Mercantile Trust and Deposit Company. Owing to its acquisition of several elevator patents that same year, the company did a strong business participating in the reconstruction of the burned city's many commercial buildings. The next year, 1905, company partner Edward Bartlett died, after which Thomas Hayward became the sole proprietor, but he opted to retain Bartlett in the existing company name. By this time, Bartlett, Hayward & Co. had become the country's largest producer of gas holders. In 1907, the company built the world's largest such gas holder (15,000,000 cubic foot capacity) in Astoria, New York. Thomas Hayward died in 1909, though shortly before this he had had the company publicly incorporated as Bartlett-Hayward Co., so that it might continue after direct family ownership ended. The newly incorporated Bartlett-Hayward was led by president Edward Bartlett Hayward, son of Thomas Hayward, with Howard Bruce as general manager. By 1913, Bartlett-Hayward employed 2,000 workers on its 3.5 acre facility in West Baltimore. Its business in gas holders and sugar processing equipment expanded across the United States and internationally.

=== World War I and 1920s ===
Beginning in 1915, Bartlett-Hayward produced many of the many munitions used by members of the Triple Entente during World War I, signing military contracts with Russia and France. Its first munition order was for 750,000 3-inch shrapnel shells for the Russian government. The confirmed demand for these shells allowed the company to expand rapidly, increasing its workforce from 4,000 to 22,000 as the war progressed. Over 6,000 of these wartime workers were women and girls. Multiple new plants were opened in short order. The company opened a large expansion plant at Sollers Point/Turner Station, spread over 55 acres and comprising 59 buildings & 6,000 workers, manufacturing toluene for high explosives, 75-millimeter, 4.7-inch artillery ammunition. Another large plant was built on 49 acres on Washington Boulevard. 155-millimeter ammunition was assembled on land now occupied by the Montgomery Park Business Center. Facilities on Bush Street manufactured steam blowers and loaded shrapnel shells. Contracts with the United States itself began in 1917, after the country entered the war, and Bartlett-Hayward began producing over 20,000 shells per day for the domestic war effort at its main plant.

During World War I, the company made munitions, ship propellers, and other materiel for the United States and its allies. It made millions of artillery shells and the artillery fuzes for them (9.6 million shells in World War I). It designed new fuze models and designed improved processes for making those shells. It also quickly created and deployed standardized retrofittable equipment for BTX recovery at illuminating gas manufacturing plants, which at the time represented an important boost to total BTX production.

In the immediate aftermath of the First World War, left-over shrapnel was melted into material for improvements to Pennsylvania Railroad's Union Tunnel. Bartlett-Hayward's shell manufacturing plant was sold to General Electric in 1920. Howard Bruce, previously general manager, became president of the company in 1917. In an era where trust consolidations were the norm, Bruce oversaw a series of acquisitions in the post-war period. Some of Bartlett-Hayward's company acquisitions included:

- George Oldham & Son Co. - Philadelphia -manufacturer of pneumatic tools
- Campbell Metal Window Corp. - Albany
- American Hammered Piston Ring Co. - Newark
- Maryland Drydock Company, a large shipyard in Fairfield, across the Patapsco River in South Baltimore.

Bartlett-Hayward's ownership of the lucrative innovation "waterless gas holders" as well as for the "Fast Self-Aligning Coupling" made the company an attractive target for acquisition. In 1925, Bruce agreed to the company's sale to McClintic-Marshall Construction Company, part of the Andrew Mellon interests. Three years later, in 1928, McClinitic-Marshall sold Bartlett-Hayward to the Koppers Company (itself 5/6ths owned by Mellon interests).

=== Depression and World War II ===
In 1936, the company greatly expanded its foundry to produce new bronze alloys, in particular a proprietary high-tensile alloy known as D.H.S. (Ductility, Hardness, Strength). This and other alloys enabled the company to produce many of the larger projects it undertook in the 1930s and 1940s, including pins for bridge bearings and piping and gates for dams. During the Great Depression, Bartlett-Hayward benefited from numerous public works contracts, many under the auspices of New Deal programs. The company built dam gates for the Tennessee Valley Authority and the United States Bureau of Reclamation. It contributed ironwork including valves, gates and pipes nationally to Wheeler Dam (Alabama), Marshall Ford Dam (Texas), Fort Peck Dam (Missouri), Mohawk Dam (Ohio), Mahoning Creek Dam (Pennsylvania), and numerous others. When the Pennsylvania Railroad expanded its tunnels in Baltimore, Bartlett-Hayward cast the tunnel's large, semi-circular supports. Due to the sophistication and scale of their operations at the time, Barlett-Hayward, along with other Baltimore-based peers like Poole and Hunt, found international prestige as "a virtual university for mechanics and machinists."

When World War II began, Bartlett-Hayward's facilities had changed so considerably from how they had existed during World War I that the decision was made not to resume production of shrapnel shells (a standing contract for which had existed with the government since the end of the war), but to instead focus on the production of artillery. Beginning in 1940, the company produced 37 mm caliber anti-aircraft gun carriages for the United States. Metal alloys from the company's foundry were also supplied to other manufacturers to produce 90mm gun carriages. Bartlett-Hayward produced many of the large-scale propeller screws for Liberty ships assembled at the nearby Bethlehem-Fairfield shipyards; at peak, the company was producing two propellers of this type per day. The company also produced parts for the ships' propulsion engines. Other defense products the company manufactured during the war were aircraft catapults for naval vessels, carriages for the Bofors 40 mm gun for the British military, and variable-pitch propellers for aircraft.

=== Post–World War II decline and closure ===
In the immediate post-war period, the company was unionized: the International Association of Machinists Memorial Lodge #1784 represented workers at the site beginning in 1948. However, in the context of a broader gradual deindustrialization in Baltimore, the staff at all of the Bartlett-Hayward division locations in the city fell to between 3,600 and 2,900 (reports vary) by 1975. Nevertheless, the Bartlett Hayward plant continued to be busy - that same year saw a record backlog of orders for the coke oven doors machined there.

Also in 1975, Koppers moved its Metal Products division's corporate headquarters from the Bartlett-Hayward site at Scott street (although that was kept open as a manufacturing site) to a newly constructed office at 3700 Koppers street, near Violetville. At this point the firm also maintained Baltimore-area sites at Bush and Hamburg street (on the edge of Pigtown) where it produced seals and piston rings, a power transmission plant in Harmans and a container machinery factory at Glen Arm.

By 1980, Koppers finally closed its Bartlett-Hayward complex at Scott Street in favor of a suburban industrial park along Interstate 95. That year, the city proposed for several of the vacant 19th-century buildings at the complex to be retrofitted as townhouses and was prepared to offer a matching grant to encourage private investment in the scheme. That plan never materialized however, and instead a nine-alarm fire tore through the former industrial buildings in 1986, providing, in the words of Sun columnist Jacques Kelly, "a finale to 150 years of smoky industrial history at Scott and Ramsay streets."

== Partners ==
Portrait	Name	Made Partner	Left Company
	George M. Hayward	1837	1838
	Alfred F. Friend	1837	1838
	Jonas Hutchinson Hayward	1840	1866
	Nehemiah Hayward	1840	1849
	Samuel Blanchard	1840	1842
	David Lewis Bartlett	1844	1899
	Horace W. Robbins	1853	1878
	Edward Lewis Bartlett	1880	1905
	Thomas Jonas Hayward	1880	1909
