= Central Avenue Historic District =

Central Avenue Historic District can refer to:

- South Central Avenue Historic District (Baltimore)
- Central Avenue Historic District (Hot Springs, Arkansas)
- Central Avenue Historic District (Lancaster, New York)
- Central Avenue Historic District (Queens, New York)
- Central Avenue Historic District (Dayton, Ohio)
- Central Avenue Historic District (Middletown, Ohio)
