= Locust Point, Baltimore =

Locust Point
- Neighborhood of Baltimore
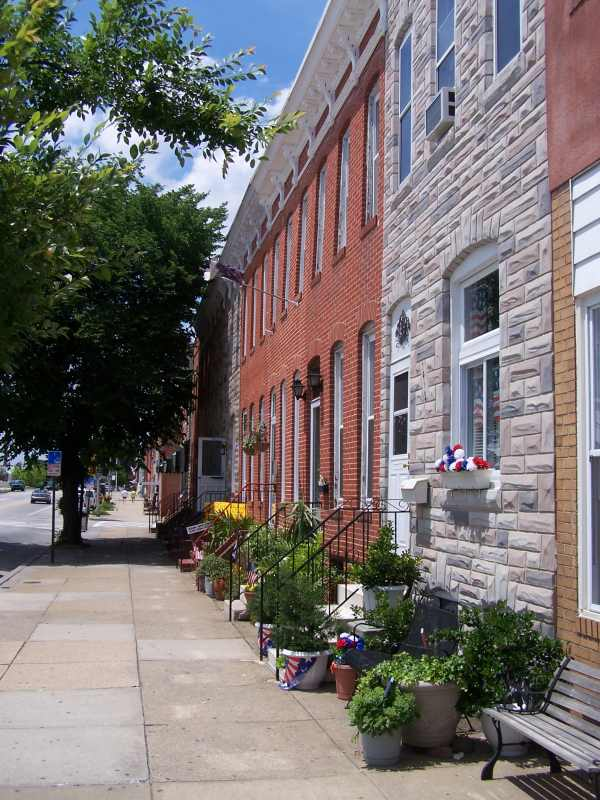
- Traditional rowhouses on East Fort Avenue in Locust Point
- Interactive map of Locust Point
- Country: United States
- State: Maryland
- City: Baltimore

Area
  - Total: 0.175 sq mi (0.45 km^{2})
  - Land: 0.175 sq mi (0.45 km^{2})

Population (2009)
  - Total: 1,858
  - Density: 10,600/sq mi (4,100/km^{2})
- Time zone: UTC-5 (Eastern)
  - Summer (DST): UTC-4 (EDT)
- ZIP code: 21230
- Area code: 410, 443, and 667
- Locust Point Historic District
- U.S. National Register of Historic Places
- U.S. Historic district
- Location within Baltimore Location within Maryland Location within the United States
- Location: Roughly bounded by Fort Ave., B & O RR., Woodall & Reynolds Sts., Baltimore, Maryland
- Coordinates: 39°16′13″N 76°35′35″W
- Area: 98 acres (40 ha)
- Architectural style: Late Federal / Greek Revivals, Italianate, Queen Anne, Classical Revival, Gothic Revival
- NRHP reference No.: 12001084
- Added to NRHP: December 26, 2012

Locust Point is a peninsular neighborhood in Baltimore, Maryland. Located in South Baltimore, the neighborhood is entirely surrounded by the Locust Point Industrial Area; the traditional boundaries are Lawrence street to the west and the Patapsco River to the north, south, and east. It once served as a center of Baltimore's Polish-American, Irish-American and Italian-American communities; in more recent years Locust Point has seen gradual gentrification with the rehabilitation of Tide Point and Silo Point. The neighborhood is also noted as being the home of Fort McHenry and the western end of its namesake tunnel that carries eight lanes of Interstate 95 under the river.

Locust Point has been called "Baltimore's Ellis Island" because the neighborhood was once the third largest point of entry for immigrants to the United States after Ellis Island and the Port of Philadelphia. From 1868 until the closure of the Locust Point piers in 1914, 1.2 million European immigrants entered Baltimore through Locust Point.

It was listed on the National Register of Historic Places in 2012.

== History ==
In 1776, with the outbreak of the American Revolution, the citizens of the City of Baltimore, assisted by the State of Maryland, dug fortifications at the end of the "Whetstone Point" peninsula that juts into Baltimore Harbor between the Northwest Branch of the Patapsco River on the north and the Middle Branch and the Ferry Branch (now the Southern Branche) to the south. This fort was named "Fort Whetstone". This fort escaped British attack, although it was nearly attacked in August 1777 when a British fleet from New York City sailed up the Chesapeake Bay to the Head of Elk in Cecil County in the northeastern corner of the state. There the ships disembarked troops heading for the new American capital city in Philadelphia, and thus engaged in the Battle of Brandywine and the Battle of Germantown. However, Baltimore was considered safe enough for the Continental Congress to meet in when Philadelphia was overrun.

Later near the war's end, French troops under Comte de Rochambeau and the American Continental troops under George Washington marched through the area and they camped for several weeks during their southward movement to trap the army of British General Lord Cornwallis at Yorktown, Virginia, in 1781. Hence, Fort Whetstone's batteries of cannon never yet had to fire in anger.

Starting In 1793 the Fort was rebuilt from scratch. By 1798, a new star-shaped fortification with additional buildings, barracks, storehouses, and bunkers was constructed under the design of French military engineer Jean Foncin, and it was renamed Fort McHenry for James McHenry of Maryland, third U.S. Secretary of War.

When Fort McHenry blocked the attempted invasion of Baltimore's inner harbor by British warships in September 1814, it was located on a grassy peninsula that was used for pasture. The grassy but jaggedly shaped peninsula point had been known as Whetstone Point, also the name of a park in London, since it was established as a port of entry by the Maryland Colonial Assembly in 1706, twenty-three years before the establishment of the town. Whetstone Point and the future South Baltimore peninsula was annexed by the City of Baltimore in 1816. The peninsula was renamed Locust Point in 1846, for the locust trees growing on the peninsula.

Many of the streets built here during the later half of the 19th century bear the names of local heroes from the War of 1812. The oldest buildings are from circa 1840-1850, two-story houses on Cuba, Clement, and Towson Streets. Portions of the neighborhood were listed on the National Register of Historic Places in 2012.

The area of Locust Point was featured in the second season of the HBO cable TV series The Wire.

On June 10, 2013, a tornado hit the Locust Point area as a part of a severe storm system sprawling across the East Coast. The tornado caused damage to a warehouse nearby.

== Industry ==
Procter & Gamble chose the Locust Point neighborhood as the location its second East Coast soap manufacturing plant in the late 1920s, reflecting the strengths of Baltimore's industrial infrastructure in the early 20th century. By 1990, the Procter and Gamble Baltimore Plant was producing only soaps like Ivory and Camay, and synthetic liquid detergents like Joy, Dawn, and liquid Cascade. In 1993, Procter & Gamble set aside reserves to fund a major restructuring of the corporation, including plant consolidation. On January 13, 1994, they announced that the Baltimore Plant was one of four that would be closed. The Baltimore Plant ceased production in 1995. In 1996, A&E International, a Korean firm, purchased the property with the intent to manufacture a specialty liquor for shipping to the Far East. Forced to abandon their plans because of the Asian financial crisis, A&E sold the plant to Struever Bros. Eccles & Rouse (SBER) in 1999, who rehabilitated the historic waterfront located at the end of Hull Street, calling it Tide Point. It was the first major redevelopment in the neighborhood in decades. When the project was completed in 2002, the former soap factory was made into office space.

There are two marine terminals of the Helen Delich Bentley Port of Baltimore located within the neighborhood, as well as the massive Domino sugar factory, a reminder that the industrial use of Baltimore Harbor is still a very important component of the local economy.

== Community ==
Locust Point is located in Baltimore City's 11th District, with the current district representative Zac Blanchard. Locust Point is part of Maryland's 46th Legislative and State Senate District, with the current state senator Bill Ferguson and current delegates Mark Edelson, Robbyn Lewis, and Luke Clippinger. Locust Point is located in Maryland's 7th congressional district, and is represented by Kweisi Mfume in Congress.

Locust Point is home to the Baltimore Museum of Industry, Fort McHenry, and Latrobe Park.. Also located in Locust Point are the Locust Point Recreation Center, a Baltimore Water Taxi stop, South Locust Point Cruise Terminal, and Francis Scott Key Elementary and Middle Grades School.

== See also ==
- List of Baltimore neighborhoods
- National Register of Historic Places listings in South and Southeast Baltimore
