= St. Brigid's School and Convent =

- U.S. National Register of Historic Places
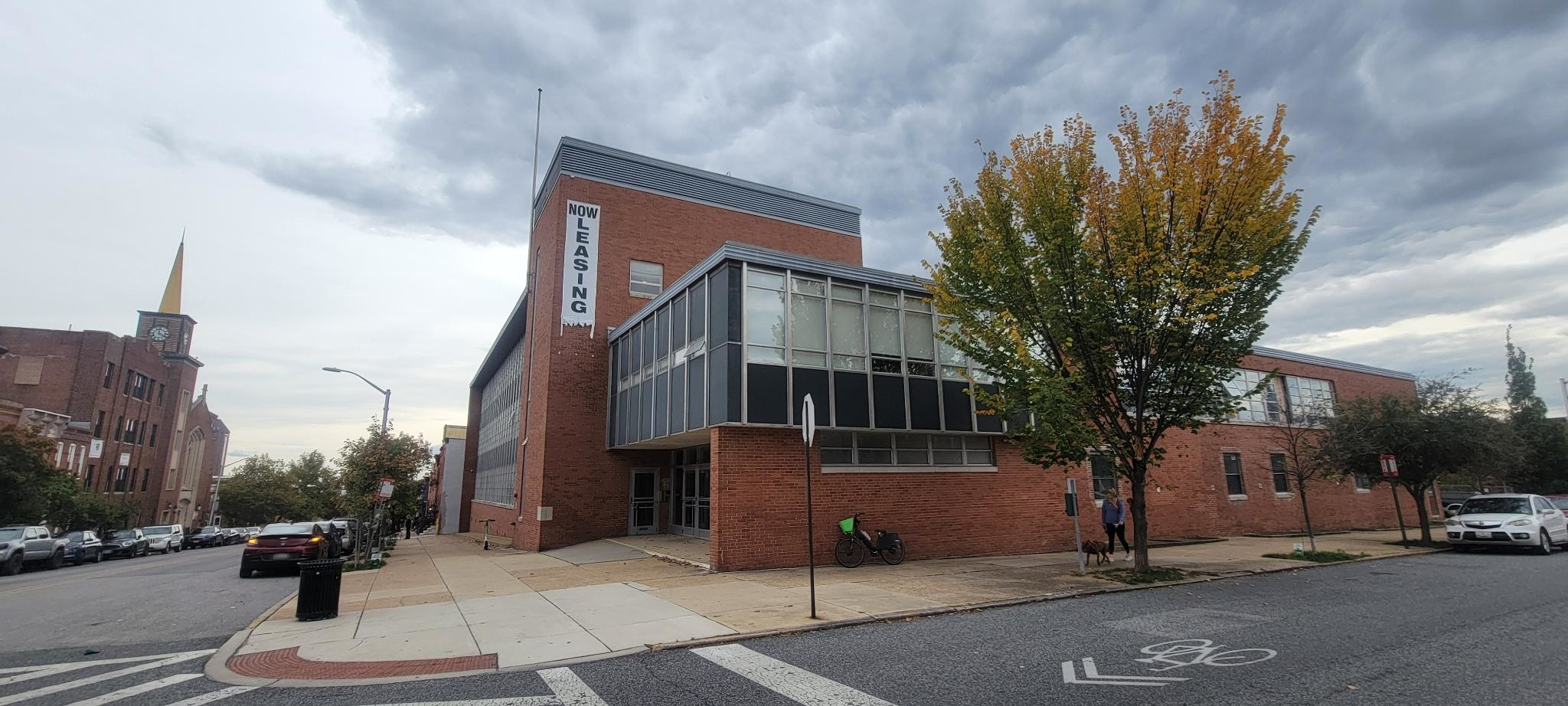
- The building in October 2025

- Location within Baltimore Location within Maryland Location within the United States
- Location: 900 S. East Ave., Baltimore, Maryland
- Coordinates: 39.28204°N 76.57147°W
- Area: less than one acre
- Built: 1961
- Architect: Glidden, Edward H.
- Architectural style: International
- NRHP reference No.: 16000909
- Added to NRHP: December 27, 2016

St. Brigid's School and Convent is a historic religious building at 900 South East Avenue in the Canton neighborhood of Baltimore, Maryland. It is a three-story L-shaped steel framed structure, its exterior finished in aluminum and brick. A two-story section at the corner of Hudson Street houses the main entrance, with a three-story classroom wing to its left. The rightmost section of the classroom wing consists of a four-story stairhouse, finished in brick with small windows, while the balance of the wing is finished in bands of windows separated by metal paneling. The school was built in 1961 to a design by Edward H. Glidden, Jr., and is a well-preserved example of mid-century International style architecture. The school was closed by the Archdiocese of Baltimore in 1980.

The building was listed on the National Register of Historic Places in 2016.

== See also ==
- National Register of Historic Places listings in South and Southeast Baltimore
