= Union Bros. Furniture Company =

- U.S. National Register of Historic Places
- Location within Baltimore Location within Maryland Location within the United States
- Location: 1120 S Hanover St. Baltimore, Maryland
- Coordinates: 39°16′34″N 76°36′56.6″W
- Area: less than one acre
- Built: 1923-1955
- Built by: Louis Ulman & Co.
- Architect: Stanislaus Russell
- NRHP reference No.: 100001959
- Added to NRHP: February 7, 2018

The Union Bros. Furniture Company, also known as the Plymouth Wallpaper Building, is a historic building located in Baltimore, Maryland, United States. It is composed of three sections that were built at three different times between 1923 and 1955. Each section reflects a distinct architectural style and construction techniques from the city's industrial architectural history. The oldest section, completed in 1923, is a utilitarian design that consists of simple brick walls and timber framing with punched openings for the windows. The second section utilized poured-in-place concrete construction techniques. The third section, completed in 1955, is a single-story mid-century modern structure that consists of brick load bearing walls that are spanned by steel beams. It features more elaborate brick detailing than the other two sections and features a streamlined aluminum entrance canopy.

The building is also significant for its association with Baltimore's furniture industry, and brothers Philip and Rubin Union and their partner Benjamin Ruttenberg who owned the building. The Union Brothers Furniture Company was in operation from 1919 to 1972. The building was listed on the National Register of Historic Places in 2018.
