= Procter and Gamble Baltimore Plant =

- U.S. National Register of Historic Places
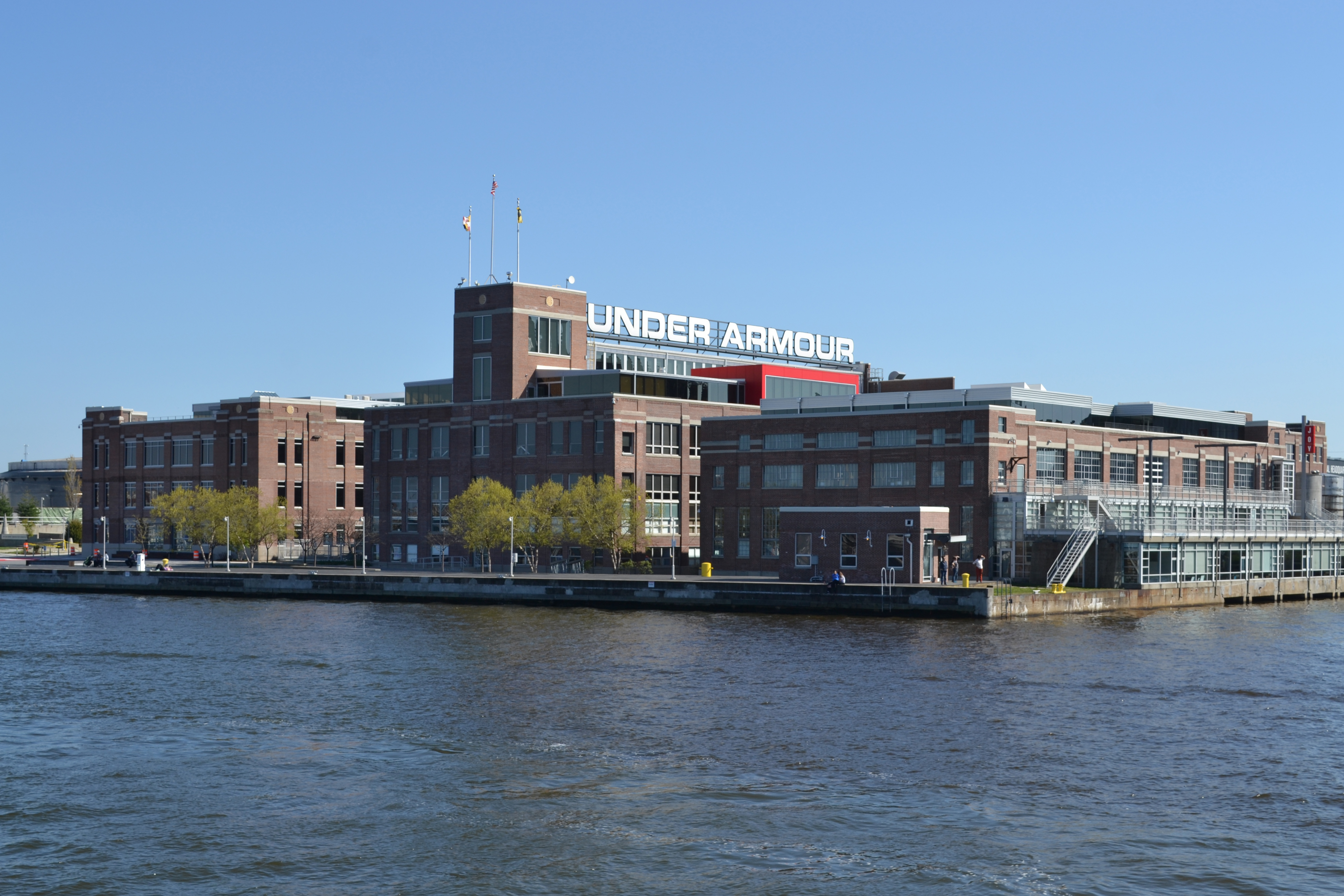
- Bar Soap, Soap Chip, and Process Buildings seen from Baltimore Harbor

- Location within Baltimore Location within Maryland Location within the United States
- Location: 1422 Nicholson St., Baltimore, Maryland
- Coordinates: 39°16′30″N 76°35′30″W
- Area: 10 acres (4.0 ha)
- Built: 1929
- Architect: Manley, Henry, engineer
- Architectural style: Modern Movement
- NRHP reference No.: 99001280
- Added to NRHP: October 28, 1999

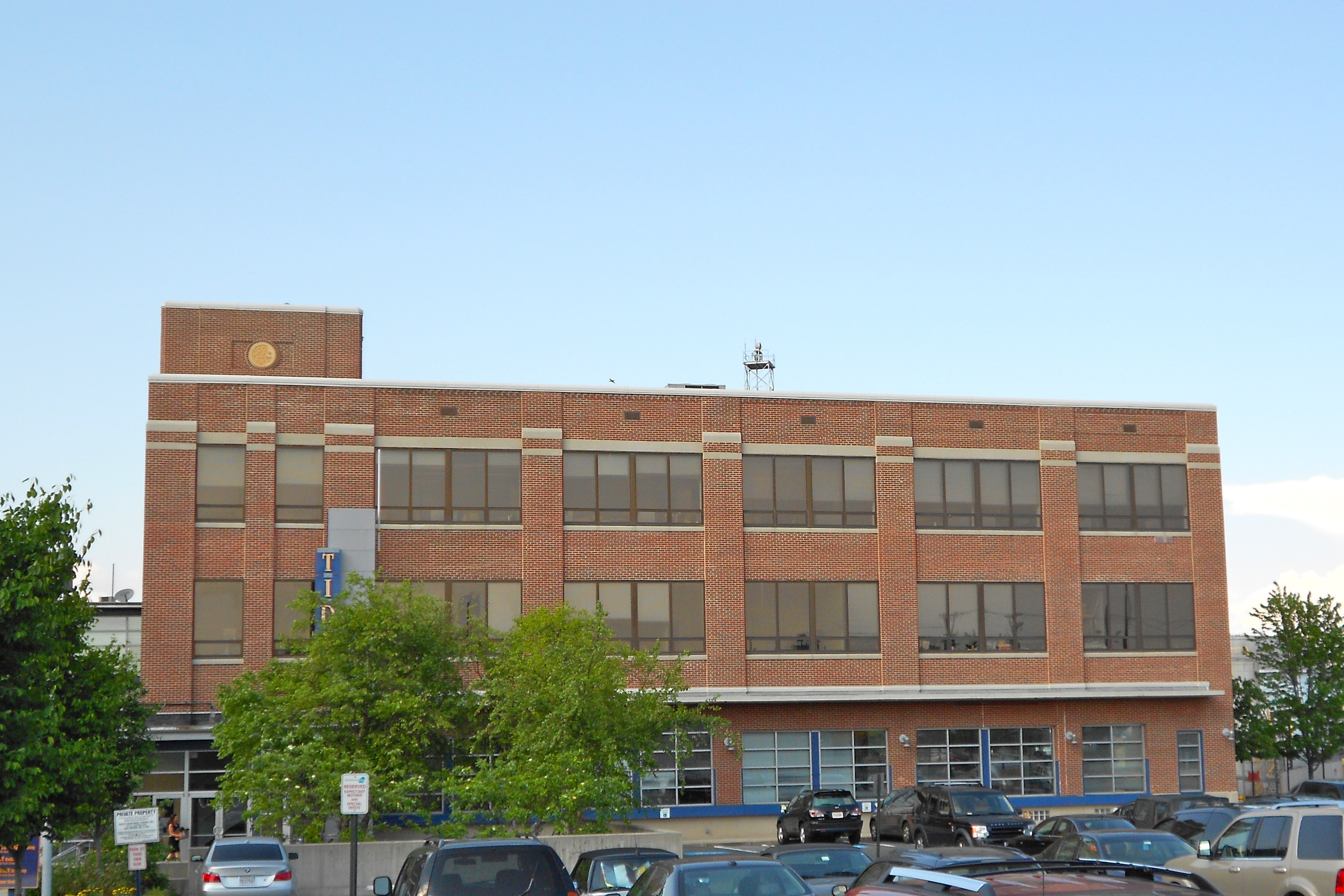
Tide Building

Procter and Gamble Baltimore Plant is a historic factory complex located at Locust Point in Baltimore, Maryland, United States. It is a compact industrial complex built by the national corporation Procter & Gamble comprising five major three-story brick buildings spread over 10 acres (40,000 m^{2}). These major buildings are the Process Building (1929), the Soap Chip Building (1929), the Bar Soap Building (1929), the Warehouse (1929), and the Tide Building (1949).

Procter & Gamble's late 1920s decision to locate its second east coast soap manufacturing plant in Baltimore reflects the strengths of Baltimore's industrial infrastructure in the early 20th century. Their choice of sites is particularly telling in light of Procter & Gamble's unique strengths as a corporation. Founded in 1837 as a family partnership, Procter & Gamble by the beginning of the 20th century had developed into a major U.S. corporation. Procter & Gamble pioneered practices such as radio and television advertising, application of technology developed by in-house laboratories, market research, brand-management systems, promotion from within the organization, employee profit-sharing, and rationalized production schedules. The company has long been known as an innovative, well-run entity that developed and refined methods that defined mid-20th century American corporate culture.

Material published in 1955 and 1964 provides an indication of the company's impact and operations. On the occasion of their 25th anniversary in 1955, Procter & Gamble placed an advertisement that touted the company's impact on Baltimore:

Better Business!

Most of the dollars that Ivory brings to Baltimore in P&G Payroll and plant-operating expenditures are quickly passed on to local business. Whenever possible Procter & Gamble buys the supplies and services it needs here in town.

Better Jobs!

Employees at Procter & Gamble are able to help make better jobs for others because they enjoy unusually steady jobs themselves -- are year- round customers for local businesses of all kinds. Procter & Gamble's famous employment plan guarantees eligible employees 48 weeks' work each year - - in addition to profit-sharing and pension benefits.

Better Living!

Tax money paid by P&G and other leading local industries benefits the entire community. It helps provide better schools and parks, greater fire and police protection.

By 1990, the Procter & Gamble Baltimore Plant was producing only soaps like Ivory and Camay, and synthetic liquid detergents like Joy, Dawn, and liquid Cascade. In 1993, Procter & Gamble set aside reserves to fund a major restructuring of the corporation, including plant consolidation. On January 13, 1994, they announced that the Baltimore Plant was one of four that would be closed.

Procter and Gamble Baltimore Plant was listed on the National Register of Historic Places in 1999. Between 1999 and 2001, the plant was converted into an office complex called Tide Point. The largest tenant is the Under Armour corporate headquarters.
