= Loft Historic District South =

Historic district in Maryland, United States

- U.S. National Register of Historic Places
- U.S. Historic district
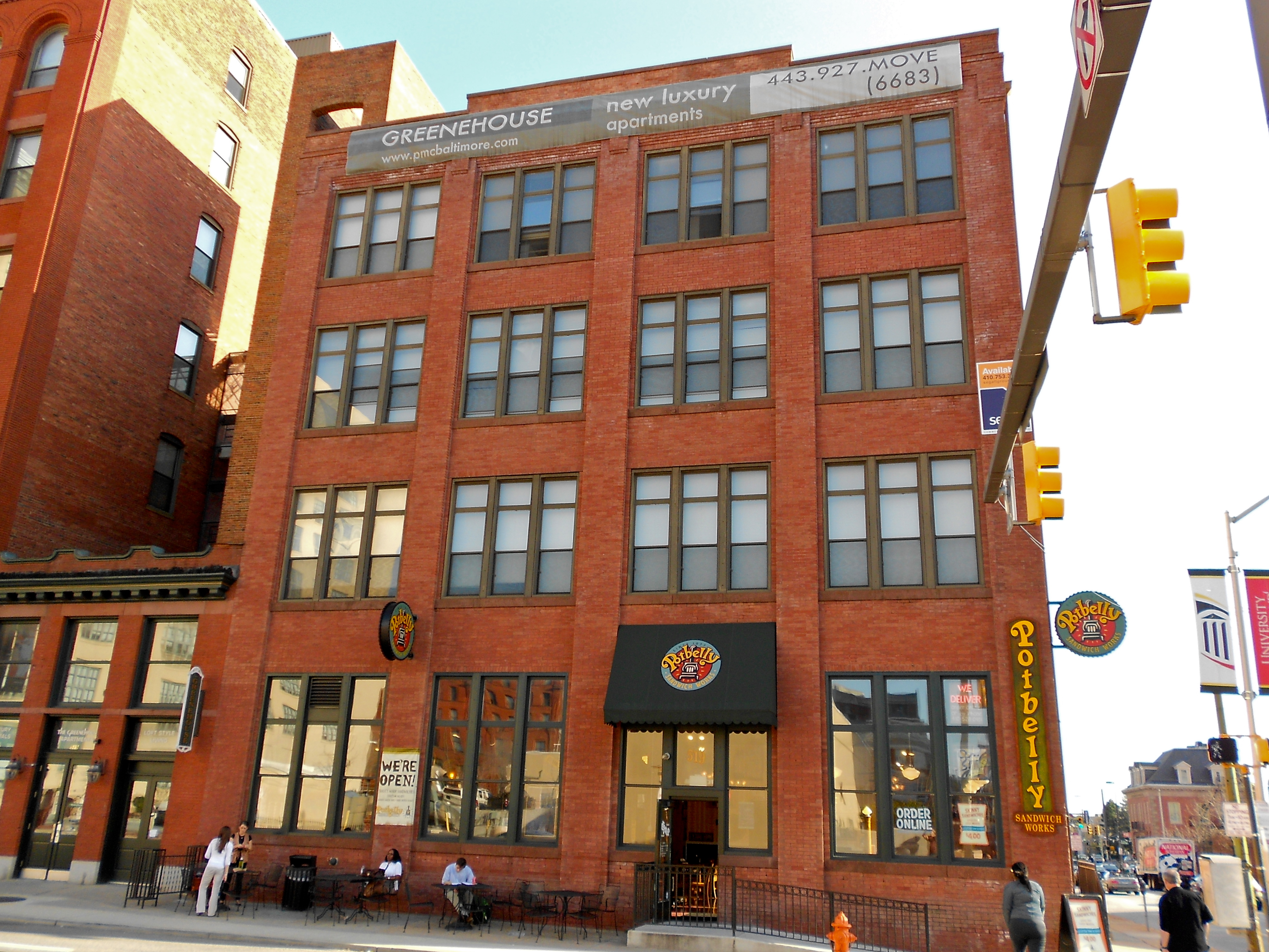

- Location within Baltimore Location within Maryland Location within the United States
- Location: Along 500 Block West Pratt Street bounded by Green Street and 100 Block South Paca Street, Baltimore, Maryland
- Coordinates: 39°17′10″N 76°37′23″W
- Area: 2 acres (0.81 ha)
- Built: 1890
- Architect: George Archer (Heywood Brothers Building)
- Architectural style: Romanesque
- NRHP reference No.: 85000017
- Added to NRHP: January 3, 1985

The Loft Historic District South is a national historic district in Baltimore, Maryland, United States. It includes seven large brick manufacturing buildings on both sides of the 500 block of West Pratt Street near the University of Maryland campus in downtown Baltimore. Of the seven buildings, four have been converted into a loft apartment building complex known as the Greenehouse. The district includes the Sonneborn Building.

The Loft Historic District South was added to the National Register of Historic Places in 1985.

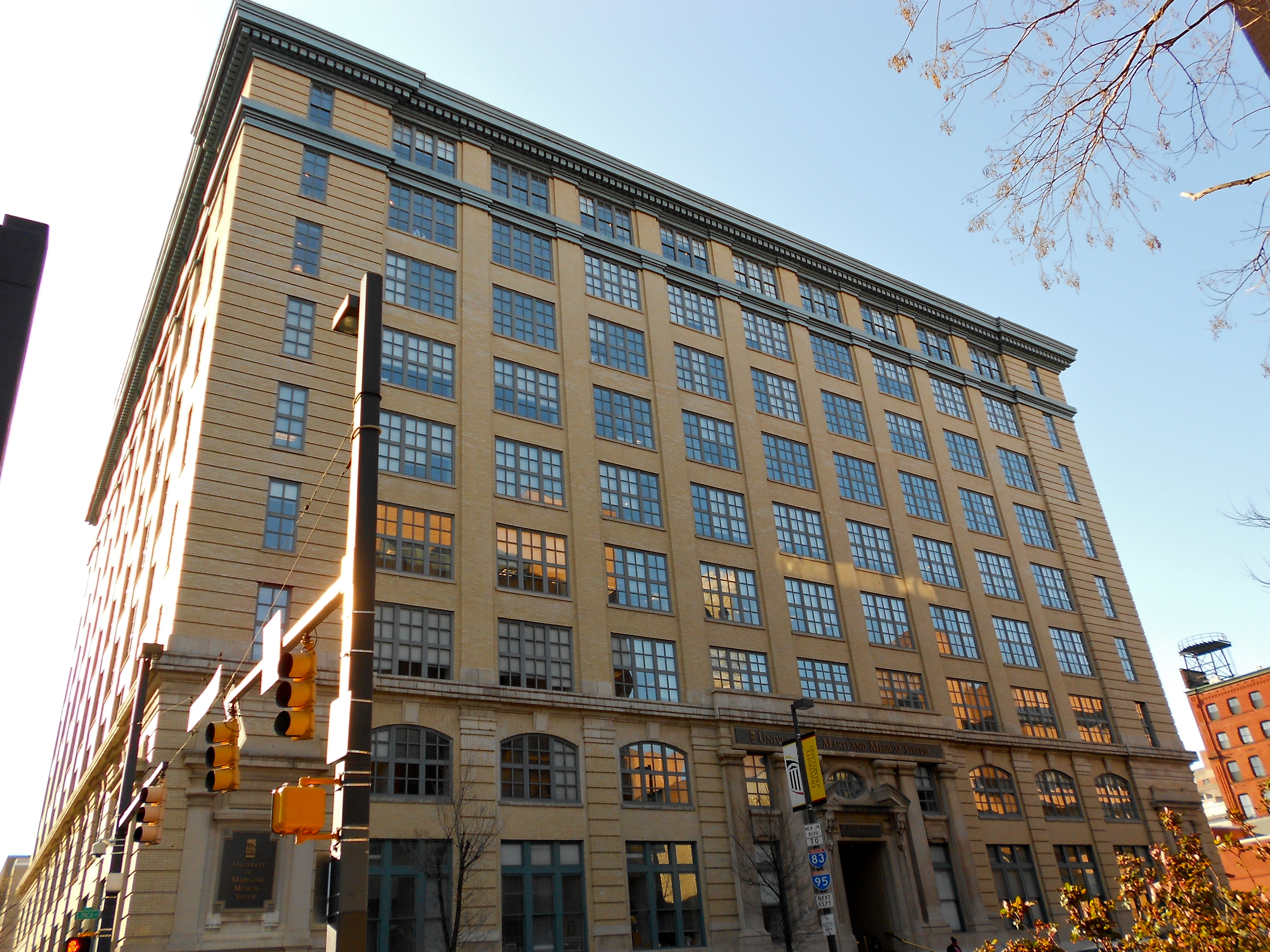
Sonneborn Building
