= School No. 27 (Commodore John Rodgers Elementary School) =

Historic school in Maryland, USA

- U.S. National Register of Historic Places
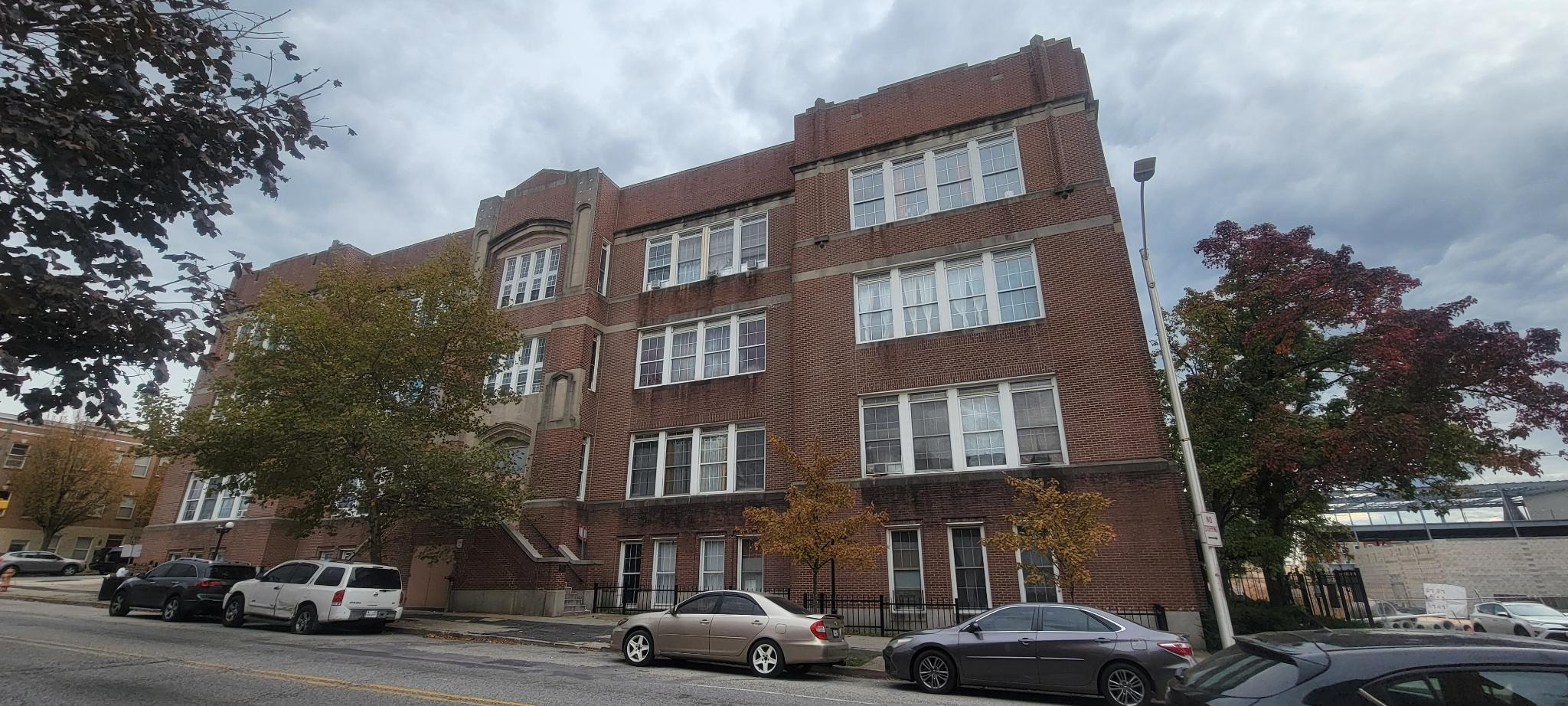

- Location within Baltimore Location within Maryland Location within the United States
- Location: 2031 East Fayette St., Baltimore, Maryland
- Coordinates: 39.2940°N 76.5880°W
- Area: 0.5 acres (0.20 ha)
- Built: 1913
- Architect: Clarence E. Stubbs
- NRHP reference No.: 86000613
- Added to NRHP: March 21, 1986

School No. 27 (Commodore John Rodgers Elementary School) is a historic elementary school located in Baltimore, Maryland, United States. It was built and opened in 1913. It is a freestanding brick building that rises 3 1/2–4 levels from a low granite base to its essentially flat roof and parapet. The exterior features a double stair of granite that leads up to the main entrance at the first floor of the building.

School No. 27 (Commodore John Rodgers Elementary School) was listed on the National Register of Historic Places in 1986.
