= Parker Metal Decoration Company Plant =

- U.S. National Register of Historic Places
- Location within Baltimore Location within Maryland Location within the United States
- Location: 333 W. Ostend St., Baltimore, Maryland
- Coordinates: 39°16′30.4″N 76°37′16.5″W
- Area: 0.7 acres (0.28 ha)
- Built: 1921
- NRHP reference No.: 00001391
- Added to NRHP: November 22, 2000

Parker Metal Decoration Company Plant is a historic factory building located at Baltimore, Maryland, United States. It is a steel-frame brick industrial building, ranging from one to three stories in height, and consists of five components built in stages between the first decade of the 20th century and the 1940s. The Parker Metal Decorating Company operated between 1921 and 1994.

Parker Metal Decoration Company Plant was listed on the National Register of Historic Places in 2000.
