= Loft Historic District North =

Historic district in Maryland, United States

- U.S. National Register of Historic Places
- U.S. Historic district
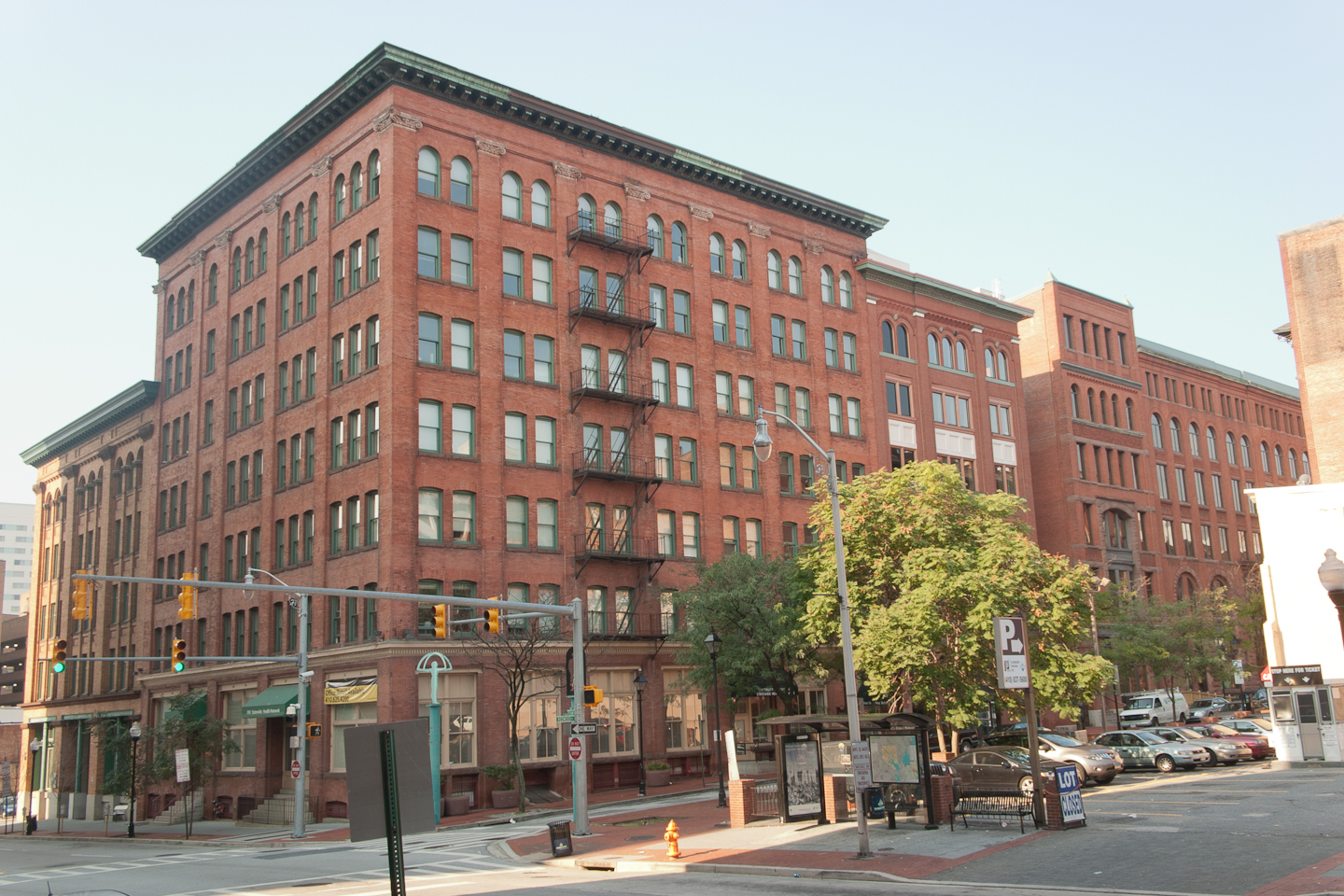
- Buildings along Redwood Street, August 2011

- Location within Baltimore Location within Maryland Location within the United States
- Location: Roughly bounded by Paca, Redwood, Eutaw, and Lombard Streets, Baltimore, Maryland
- Coordinates: 39°17′18″N 76°37′19″W
- Area: 3 acres (1.2 ha)
- Built: 1875
- Architectural style: Late Victorian, Romanesque, Early Modern Industrial
- NRHP reference No.: 85000016
- Added to NRHP: January 3, 1985

The Loft Historic District North is a national historic district in Baltimore, Maryland, United States. It includes 12 large 19th–early 20th century vertical brick manufacturing buildings centering on Paca, Redwood, and Eutaw Streets near the University of Maryland Campus in downtown Baltimore. Most of the buildings are still used for manufacturing purposes, although a few, including the Heiser, Rosenfeld, and Strauss buildings, have been converted into loft apartments or offices. They are representative of Romanesque, Victorian, and early modern industrial architectural design. It was in this area that Baltimore's garment industry grew to national importance.

The Loft Historic District North was added to the National Register of Historic Places in 1985.
