= Wilkens–Robins Building =

- U.S. National Register of Historic Places
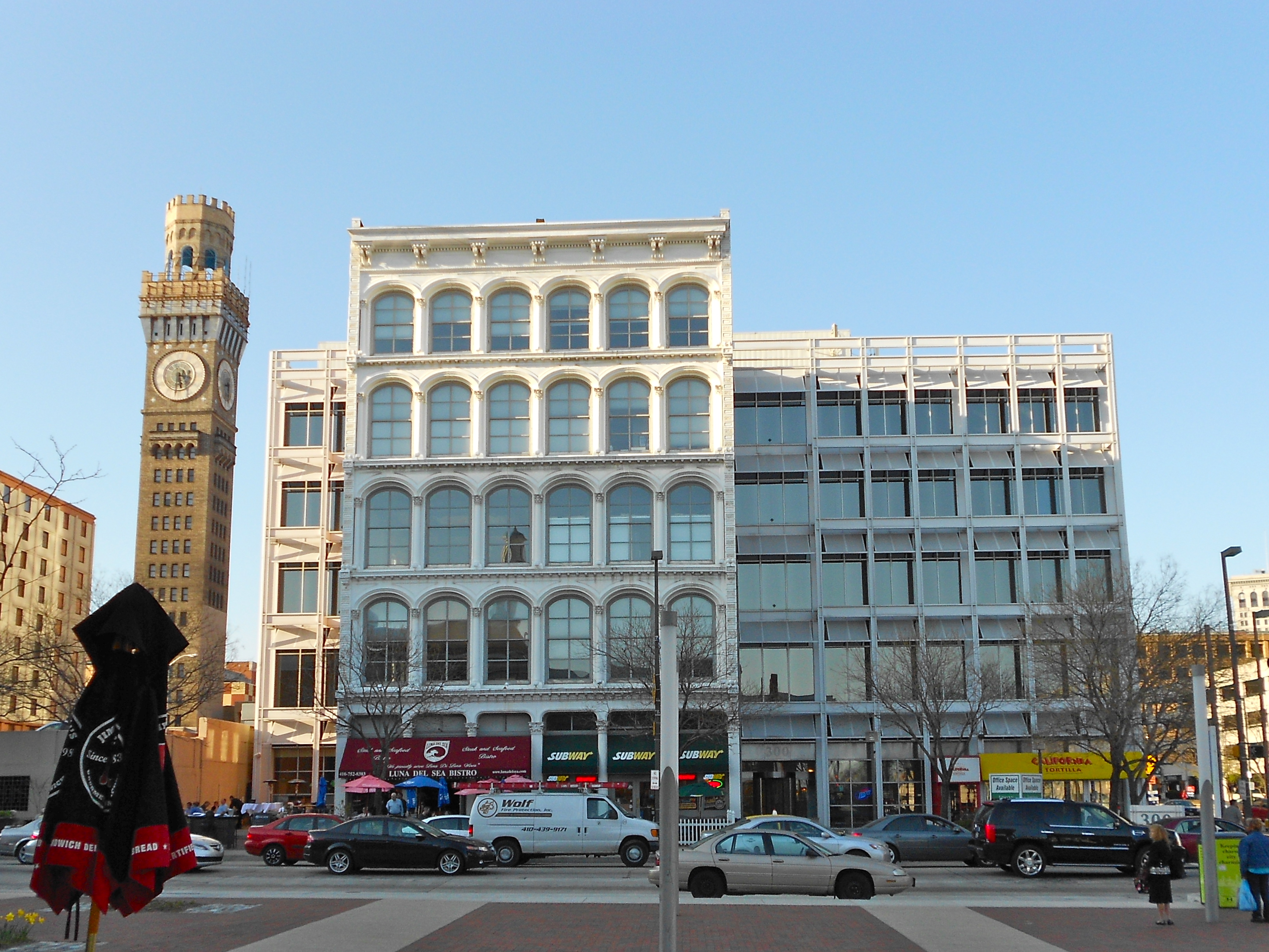
- Wilkens–Robins Building, March 2012

- Location within Baltimore Location within Maryland Location within the United States
- Location: 308–312 W. Pratt St., Baltimore, Maryland
- Coordinates: 39°17′11″N 76°37′12″W
- Area: less than one acre
- Built: 1871
- Architect: Bartlett-Hayward Company
- Architectural style: Renaissance, North Italian Renaissance
- NRHP reference No.: 80001792
- Added to NRHP: December 3, 1980

Wilkens–Robins Building is a historic loft building located at Baltimore, Maryland, United States. It was built in 1871 and is a five-story, six-bay brick structure with a cast iron front. It is approximately 80 feet (24 m) tall, 50 feet (15 m) wide, and 110 feet (34 m) deep with a gently sloping roof. The facade features an expanse of oversized windows and are the highlights of one of the few surviving cast-iron facades in Baltimore.

The Wilkens–Robins Building was listed on the National Register of Historic Places in 1980.
