= Building at 239 North Gay Street =

- U.S. National Register of Historic Places
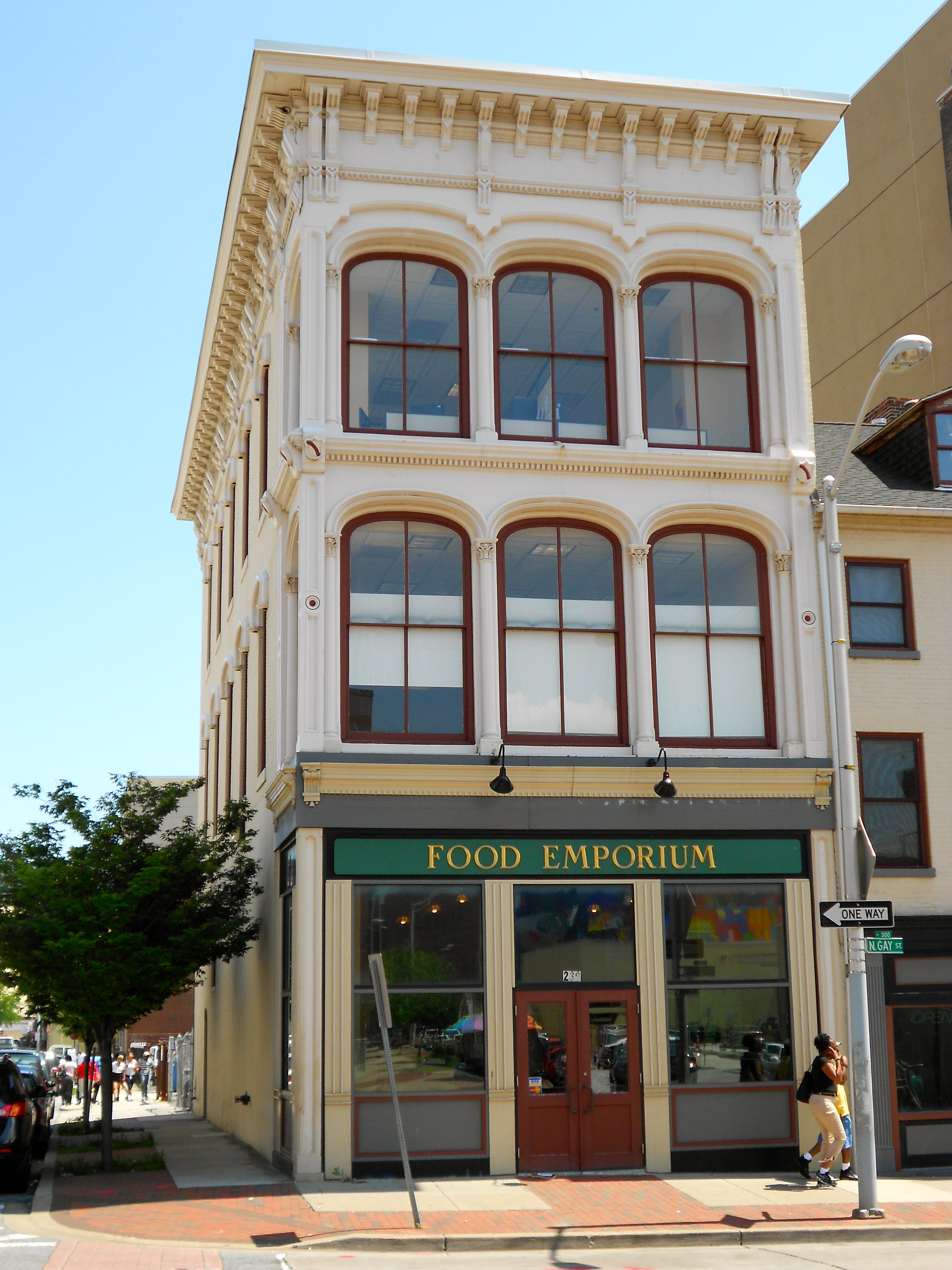
- Building at 239 North Gay Street, May 2012

- Location within Baltimore Location within Maryland Location within the United States
- Location: 239 N. Gay St., Baltimore, Maryland
- Coordinates: 39°17′35.3″N 76°36′28.7″W
- Area: less than one acre
- Built: 1875
- Architectural style: Italianate
- MPS: Cast Iron Architecture of Baltimore MPS
- NRHP reference No.: 94001202
- Added to NRHP: October 7, 1994

Building at 239 North Gay Street, also known as Spartana Electronics, is a historic building located at Baltimore, Maryland, United States. It is a tall three-story iron-front structure of Italianate style built in 1875. It represents a Full Cast Iron Front and Major Exterior Cast Iron Detail type building. It was altered at street level by the construction of a modern store façade. Large window openings are flanked by Corinthian columns and headed by segmental arches. In 1974, the property was purchased by Anthony R. Spartana, who founded an electronic supplies business in 1925.

Building at 239 North Gay Street was listed on the National Register of Historic Places in 1994.
