= Public School No. 25 =

Historic elementary school in Maryland, USA

- U.S. National Register of Historic Places
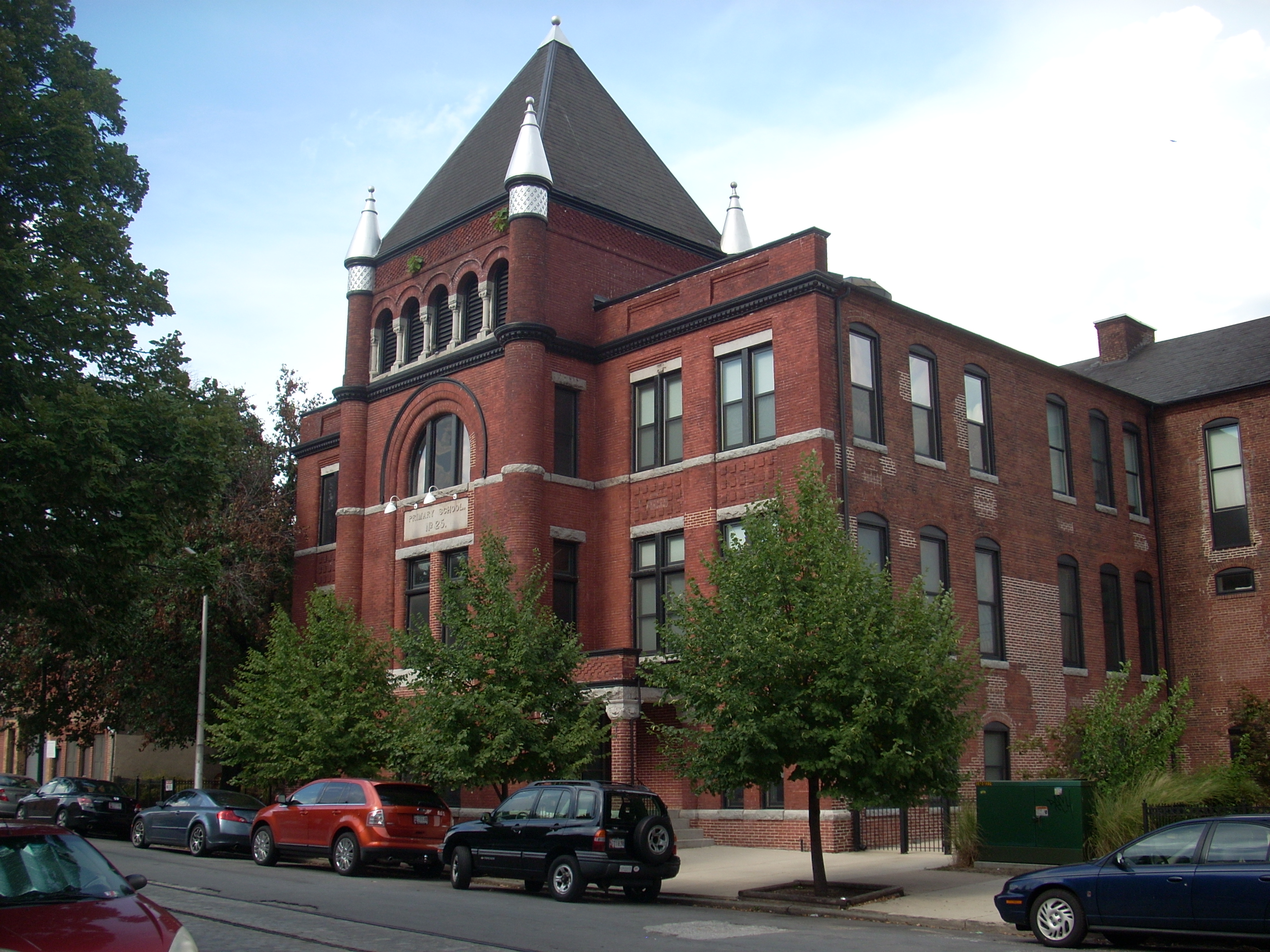
- Public School No. 25 in 2011

- Location within Baltimore Location within Maryland Location within the United States
- Location: S. Bond St., Baltimore, Maryland
- Coordinates: 39°17′6″N 76°35′43″W
- Area: 0.3 acres (0.12 ha)
- Built: 1892
- Architect: Kratz, Charles
- Architectural style: Late Victorian, Romanesque
- NRHP reference No.: 79001111
- Added to NRHP: September 25, 1979

Public School No. 25 (also known as "Captain Henry Fleete School" or "Primary School 25"), is a historic elementary school located at Baltimore, Maryland, United States. It is a late Victorian brick structure with an imposing Romanesque tower. It is a two-story, brick structure with a ground-level basement and features a central three-story tower capped by a pyramidal roof. It served a school for nearly 75 years.

Public School No. 25 was listed on the National Register of Historic Places in 1979.
