= Equitable Gas Works =

- U.S. National Register of Historic Places
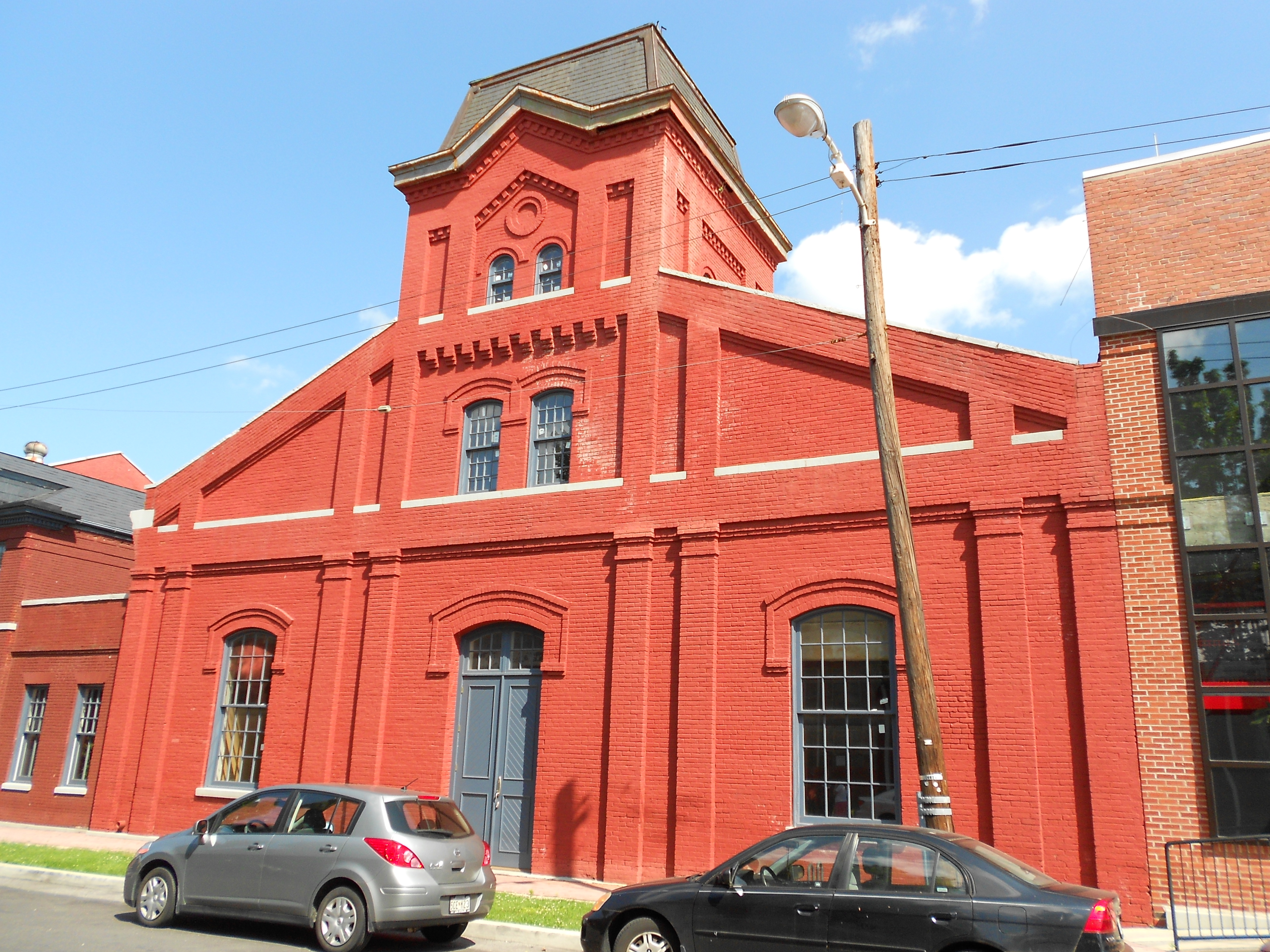
- Equitable Gas Works, May 2012

- Location within Baltimore Location within Maryland Location within the United States
- Location: 1401 Severn St., Baltimore, Maryland
- Coordinates: 39°16′30.1″N 76°37′56.3″W
- Area: 2.8 acres (1.1 ha)
- Built: 1882
- Architectural style: Romanesque
- NRHP reference No.: 03001322
- Added to NRHP: December 29, 2003

Equitable Gas Works is a historic gas works located at Baltimore, Maryland, United States. It is a U-shaped complex occupying an entire city block and consisting of five 1882-1883 Romanesque Revival painted brick buildings ranging from one to two stories in height and one 1947 office building adjacent to CSX tracks in Spring Gardens, an industrial precinct in South Baltimore, Maryland.

The rectangular, 19 century buildings are set on semi-coursed stone foundations, and are topped with monitor and gable roofs. The buildings exhibit a recessed wall plane behind paired brick pilasters and corbelled brick cornices and oculus openings set within their gables. The Office is notable for its delicate wood louvered dormer with a sunburst- ornamented tympanum. The exposed structural system remains visible in the industrial buildings; historic finishes also survive in the office building. The architect for the building is not presently known.

The period of gas production in the complex extends from 1882 to 1901, when gas-related uses abandoned the site. Despite infill and alterations, Equitable Gas Works complex retains all of its original brick buildings and remains clearly recognizable as a purpose-built, 19 century gas manufactory. Both the form and massing of the buildings and the quality and character of surviving architectural fabric provide important evidence of the stature of the manufactured gas industry in the late 19 century.

Equitable Gas Works was listed on the National Register of Historic Places in 2003.
