= Maryland White Lead Works =

- U.S. National Register of Historic Places
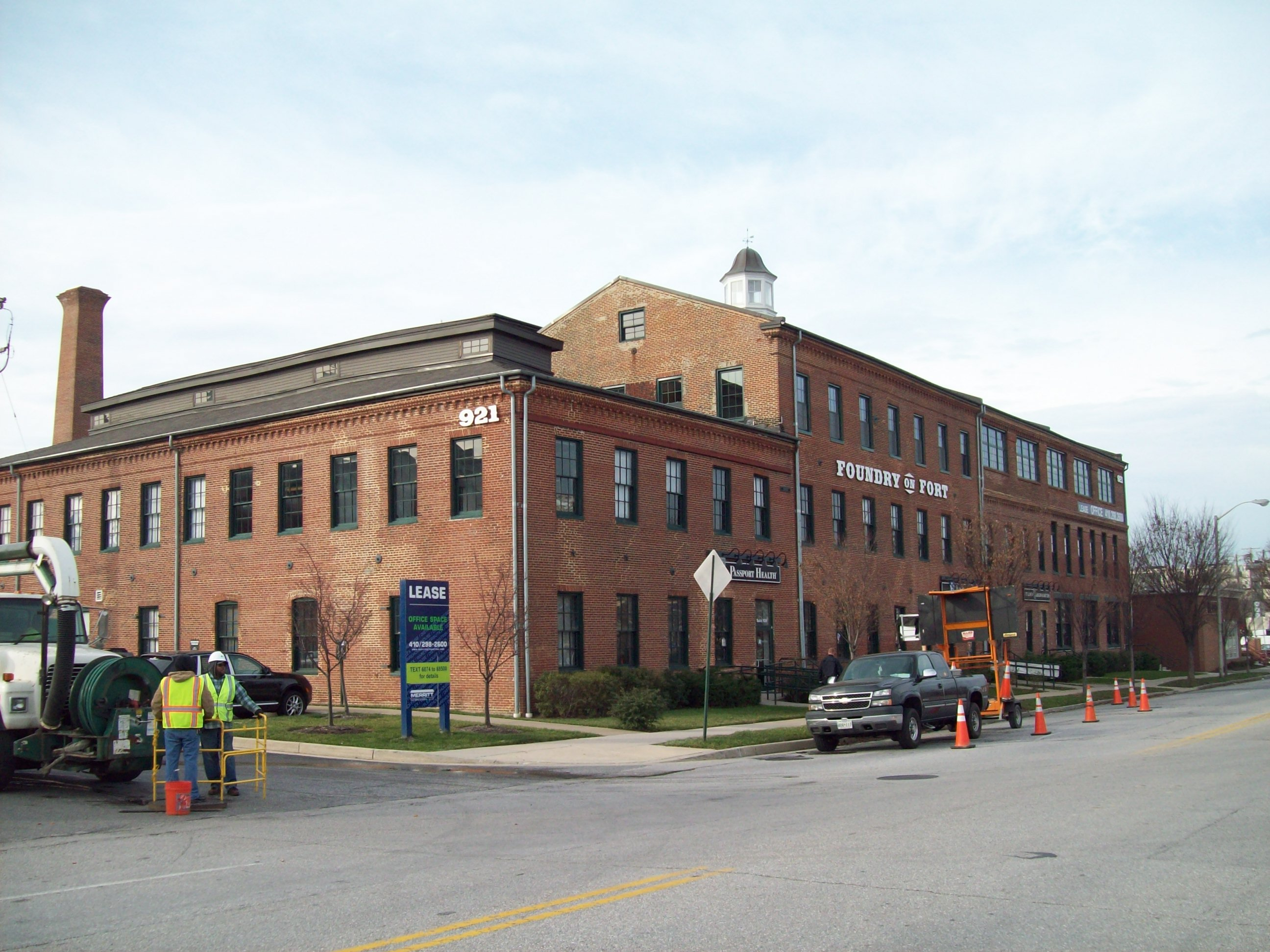
- Maryland White Lead Works, December 2011

- Location within Baltimore Location within Maryland Location within the United States
- Location: 921–979 E. Fort Ave., Baltimore, Maryland
- Coordinates: 39°16′14.3142″N 76°36′3.6642″W
- Area: 4 acres (1.6 ha)
- Built: 1867
- Architectural style: lead works
- NRHP reference No.: 02001604
- Added to NRHP: December 27, 2002

Maryland White Lead Works is a historic lead paint factory complex located at Baltimore, Maryland, United States. It is a U-shaped industrial complex constructed about 1867. It consists of nine interconnected brick and wood-frame buildings, which vary in height from one to four stories, surrounding a yard. The complex includes the powerhouse, two production sheds, a manufactory loft with an office wing, and a service building. The Maryland White Lead Company occupied the site from 1867 to 1896, Baltimore's first and most substantial manufacturer of lead paints.

Maryland White Lead Works was listed on the National Register of Historic Places in 2002.
