= Heiser, Rosenfeld, and Strauss Buildings =

Historic buildings in Maryland, USA

- U.S. National Register of Historic Places
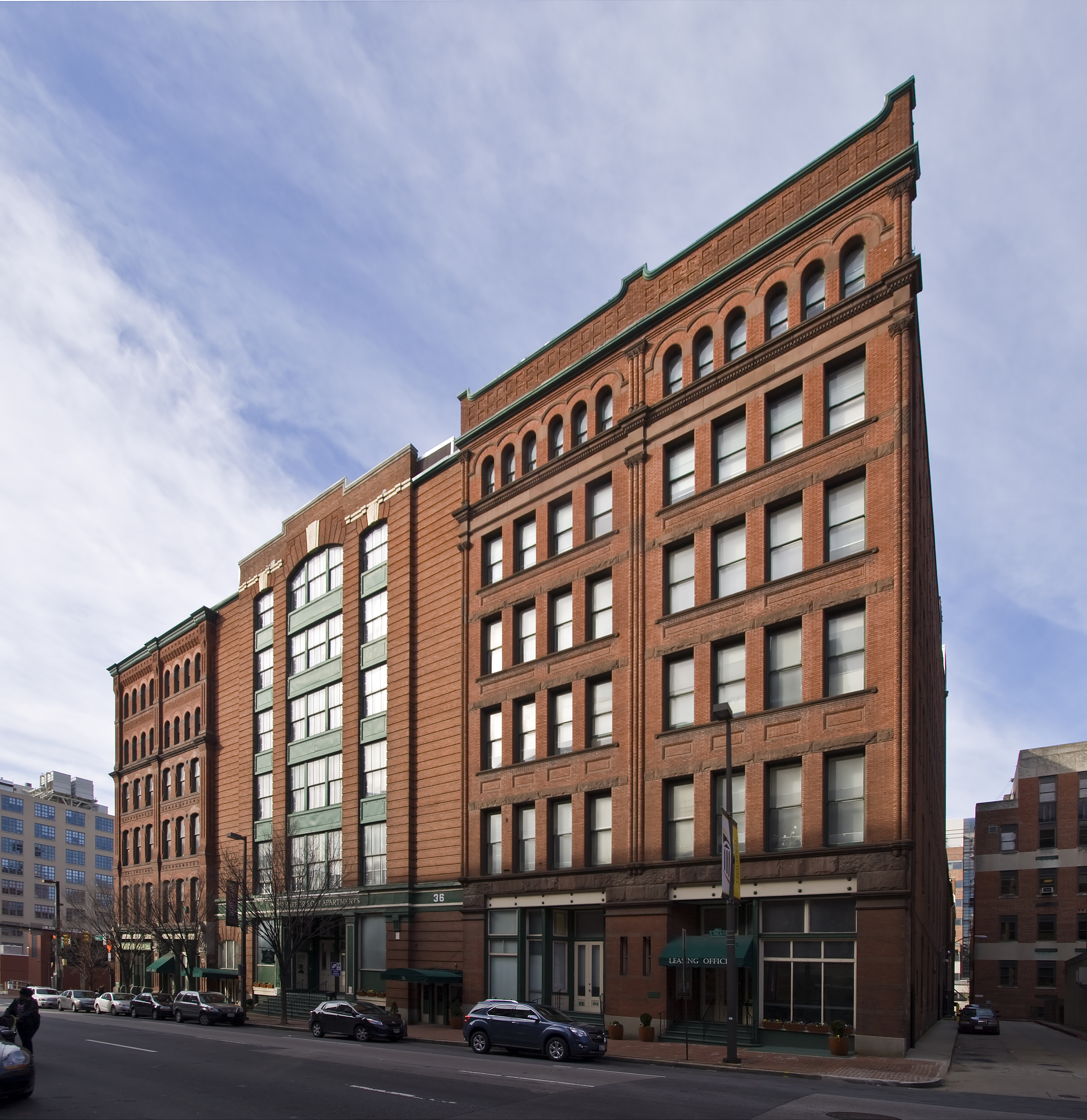
- Heiser, Rosenfeld, and Strauss Buildings, February 2012

- Location within Baltimore Location within Maryland Location within the United States
- Location: 32-42 S. Paca St. Baltimore, Maryland, U.S.
- Coordinates: 39°17′16″N 76°37′21″W
- Area: 0.5 acres (0.20 ha)
- Built: 1886
- Architect: Parker & Thomas; Et al.
- Architectural style: Late Victorian, Beaux Arts, Romanesque
- NRHP reference No.: 80001787
- Added to NRHP: March 10, 1980

Heiser, Rosenfeld, and Strauss Buildings, also known as Inner Harbor Lofts I, is a historic loft building located at Baltimore, Maryland, United States. It is a complex of three structures. The Heiser Building is a Romanesque Revival style, six-story brick, stone, and iron structure, eight bays wide and 14 bays deep, built as a show factory in 1886. The Rosenfeld Building is a six-story, five-bay loft building, with Beaux Arts styling and built for E. Rosenfeld and Company in 1905. The Strauss Building is a six-story high, six-bay wide, and 11-bay deep loft structure built in 1887 for the Kinny Tobacco Company, cigarette manufacturers, and later occupied by the Strauss Brothers, clothing manufacturers and became part of the Rosenfeld complex around 1910.

Heiser, Rosenfeld, and Strauss Buildings was listed on the National Register of Historic Places in 1980.
