= Turner-White Casket Co. Building =

- U.S. National Register of Historic Places
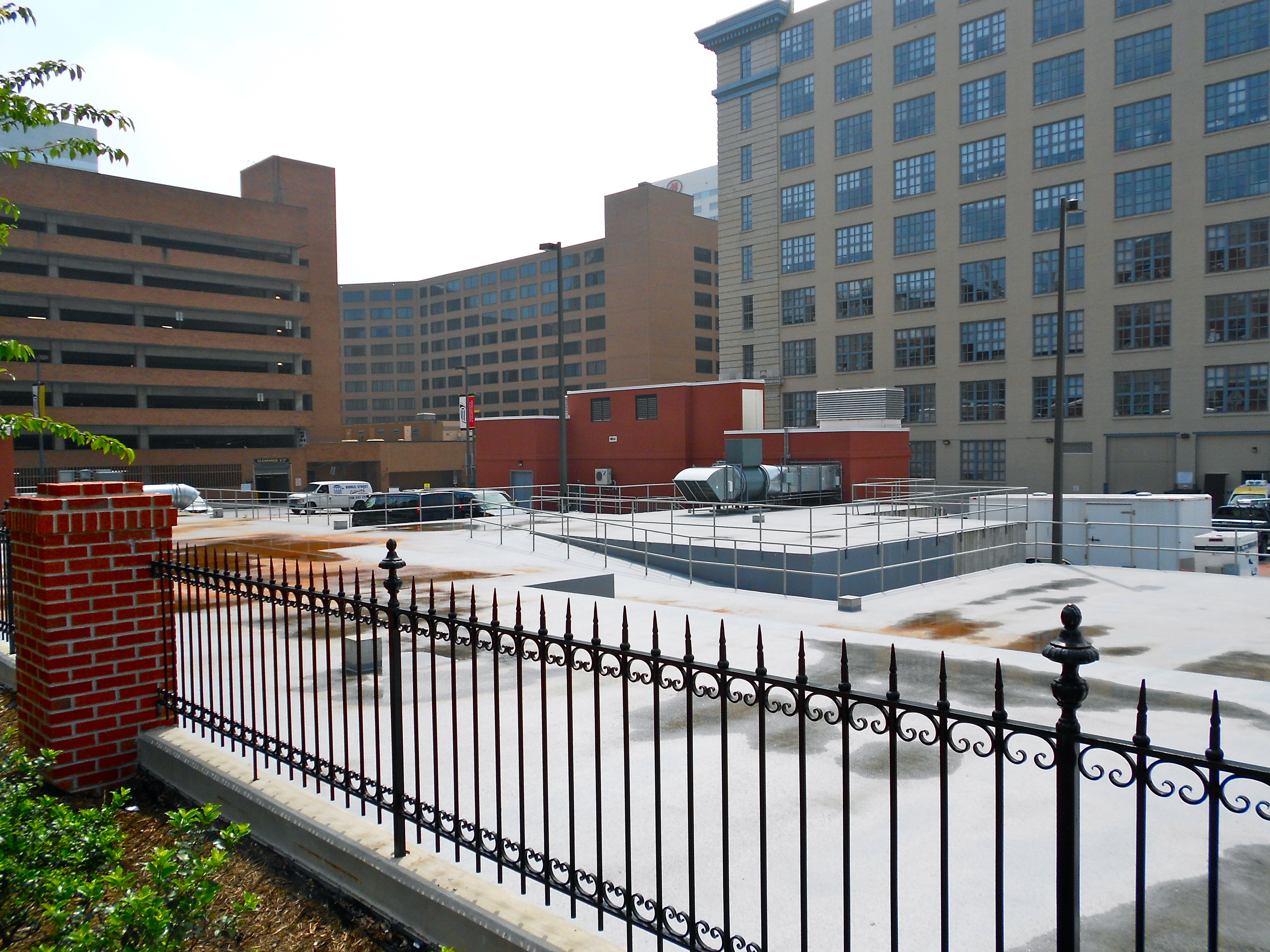
- Site in 2012

- Location within Baltimore Location within Maryland Location within the United States
- Location: 509--511 W. Lombard St., Baltimore, Maryland
- Coordinates: 39°17′14″N 76°37′21″W
- Area: less than one acre
- Built: 1893
- Architectural style: Romanesque
- MPS: Cast Iron Architecture of Baltimore MPS
- NRHP reference No.: 94001553
- Added to NRHP: January 26, 1995

Turner-White Casket Co. Building was a historic loft building located at Baltimore, Maryland, United States. It was a six-story loft building constructed in 1893 in the Romanesque style. Its façade organization and detailing featured brick, stone, and cast iron elements. It was two bays wide and six stories high with a full basement.

It was constructed as a factory with street level display rooms that was rehabilitated in the 1990s. The Turner-White Casket Co. occupied the building from 1931 to 1965. A 2012 photograph shows that a parking lot now occupies the building site.

Turner-White Casket Co. Building was listed on the National Register of Historic Places in 1995.
