= Sonneborn Building =

Historic place in Maryland, United States

- U.S. National Register of Historic Places
- U.S. Historic district – Contributing property
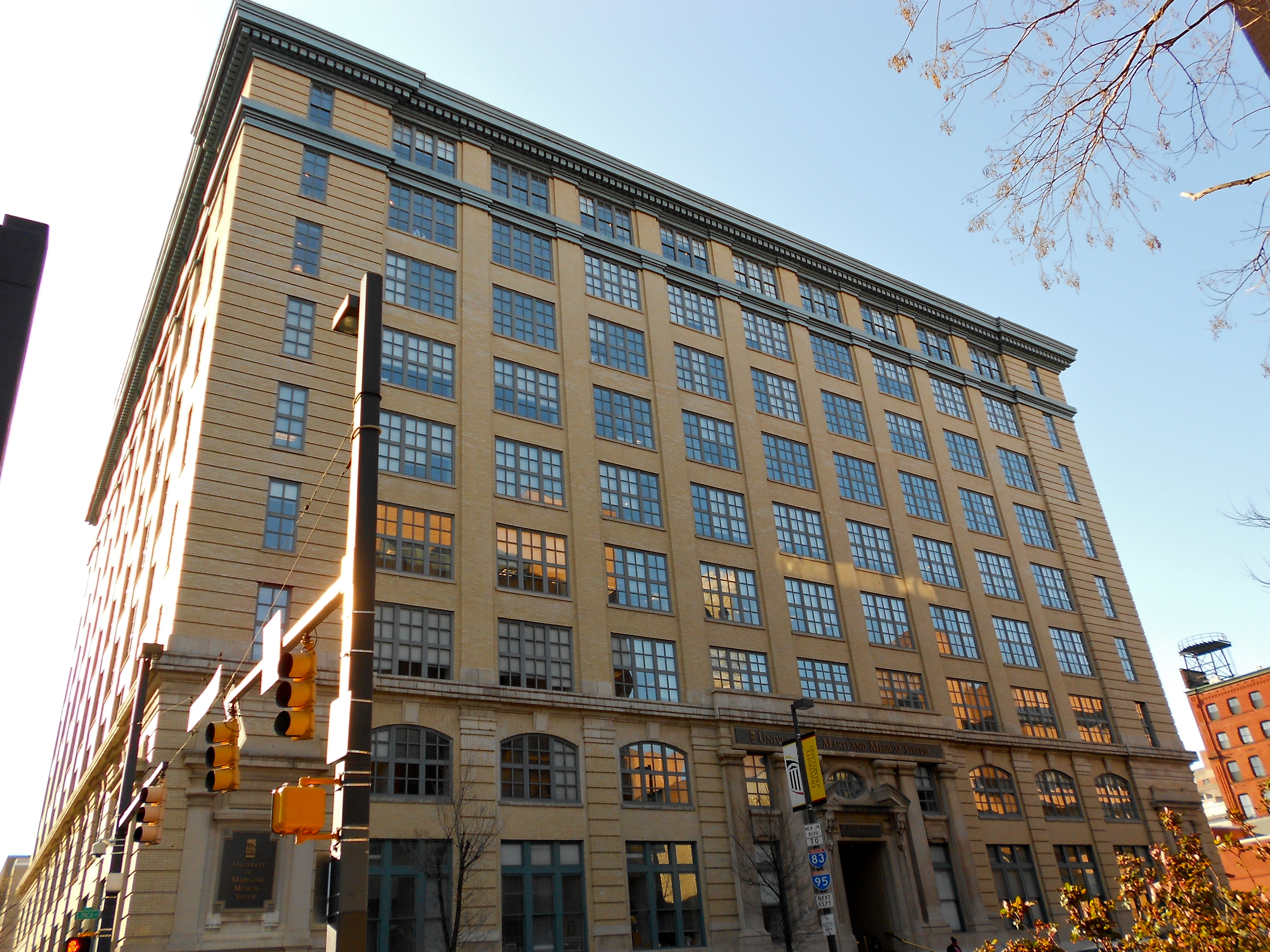
- Sonneborn Building March 2012

- Location within Baltimore Location within Maryland Location within the United States
- Location: 110 South Paca Street, Baltimore, Maryland
- Coordinates: 39°17′11″N 76°37′21″W
- Area: 0.6 acres (0.24 ha)
- Built: 1905
- Architect: Theodore Wells Pietsch
- Architectural style: Classical Revival, Late 19th And Early 20th Century American Movements, Industrial/Loft
- NRHP reference No.: 82001588
- Added to NRHP: October 29, 1982

Sonneborn Building, also known as Paca-Pratt Building, is a historic loft building in Baltimore, Maryland, United States. Designed by Theodore Wells Pietsch, it is a nine-story loft building constructed in 1905 of "fireproof" reinforced-concrete construction, faced in buff-colored brick, with a coursed ashlar foundation and stone trim. Its detailing reflects the Neoclassical Revival of the early 20th century. It was built for Henry Sonneborn and Company as a vertical clothing manufactory and was the tallest and largest strictly manufacturing building in the city of Baltimore.

Sonneborn Building was listed on the National Register of Historic Places in 1982. It is located in the Loft Historic District South.
