= South Central Avenue Historic District =

Historic district in Maryland, United States

- U.S. National Register of Historic Places
- U.S. Historic district
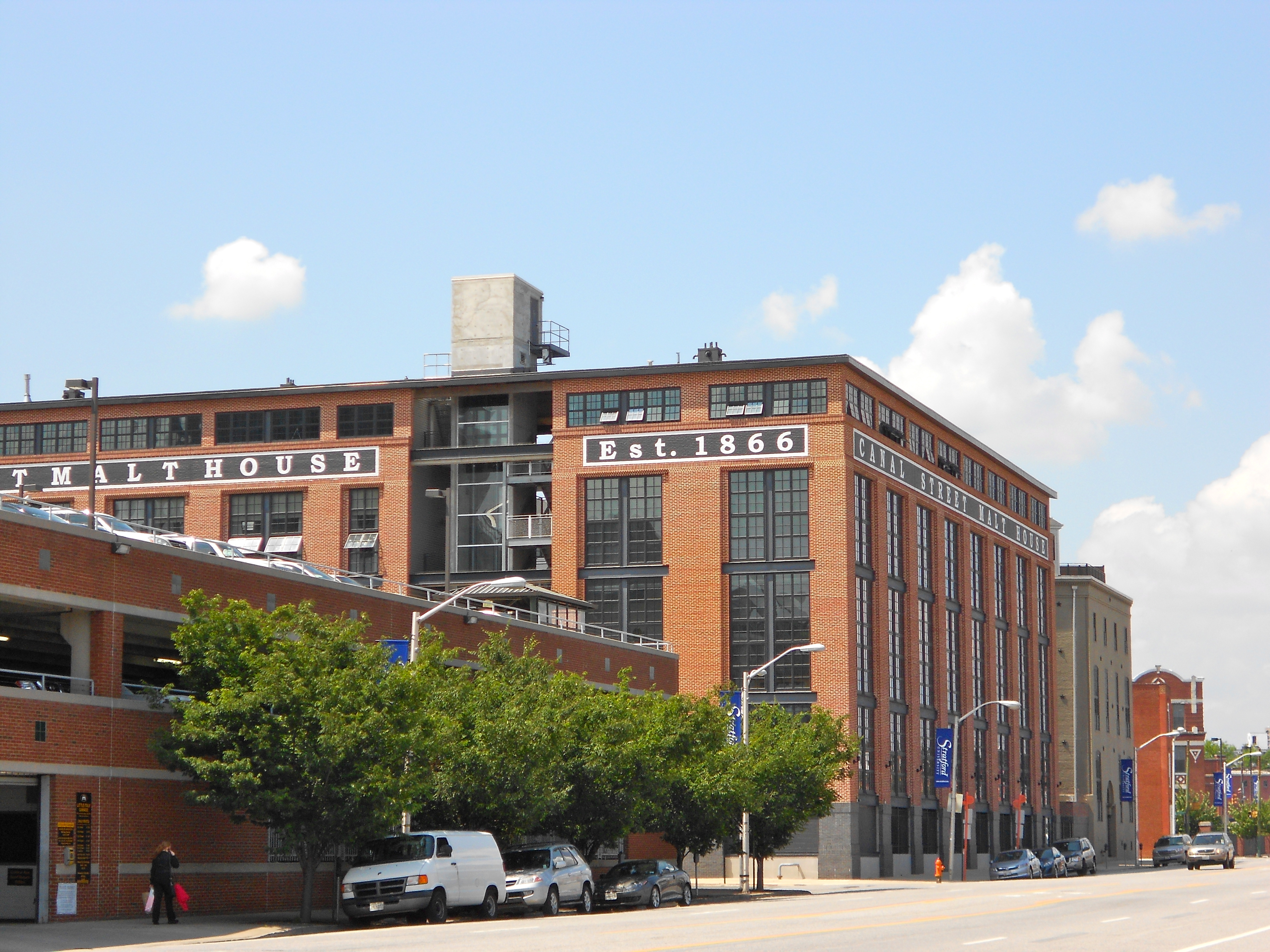
- Malt house, May 2012

- Location within Baltimore Location within Maryland Location within the United States
- Location: Approx. 8 blocks centering Central Ave. Bet. Pratt and Fleet Sts., Baltimore, Maryland
- Coordinates: 39°17′12″N 76°35′58″W
- Area: 21 acres (8.5 ha)
- Architectural style: Mid 19th Century Revival, Late Victorian, et al.
- NRHP reference No.: 01001213
- Added to NRHP: November 11, 2001

South Central Avenue Historic District is a national historic district in Baltimore, Maryland, United States. It contains brick two- and three-story industrial and residential buildings reflecting over 150 years of utilitarian adaptation of buildings and space. The district includes early 19th century rowhouses, late 19th century and early 20th century manufacturing and warehouse buildings, gas stations, stables, car barns, commercial/residential buildings, and corner stores. Several larger buildings are the Bagby Furniture Company Building (4 stories), the Strauss Malt House (5 stories), and the Alameda School. Many rowhouses have been covered with formstone.

It was added to the National Register of Historic Places in 2001.
