= Montgomery Ward Warehouse and Retail Store =

Historic place in Maryland, United States

- U.S. National Register of Historic Places
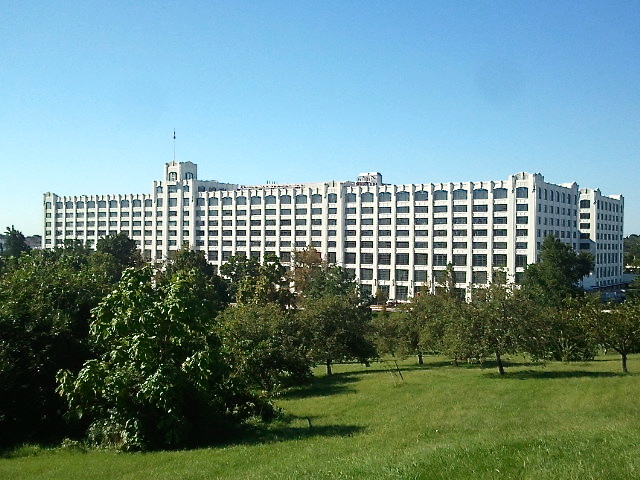
- Montgomery Ward Warehouse and Retail Store, September 2012

- Location within Baltimore Location within Maryland Location within the United States
- Location: 1000 S. Monroe St., Baltimore, Maryland
- Coordinates: 39°16′34″N 76°38′41″W
- Area: 16.2 acres (6.6 ha)
- Built: 1925
- Built by: Wells Bros. Construction Co.
- Architect: McCaully, W.H.
- Architectural style: Early Commercial, Art Deco
- NRHP reference No.: 00001085
- Added to NRHP: September 14, 2000

Montgomery Ward Warehouse and Retail Store is a historic warehouse and retail building in Baltimore, Maryland, United States. It is an eight-story (plus penthouse) concrete structure and is roughly shaped like a squared-off number "4". The front features a penthouse tower at the main entrance bay with a balcony and capped by a flagpole. The building houses over 1,200,000 square feet (110,000 m^{2}) of floor space flooded by light from approximately 1,000 large multi-paned, steel frame windows. It was built about 1925 as a mail order and retail warehouse for Montgomery Ward on an 11 acres (4.5 ha) site adjacent to the Baltimore and Ohio Railroad tracks. The complex was one of nine large warehouses built by the company in the United States.

From 2001 to 2002, the vacant warehouse was restored as an office building by Himmelrich Associates, Inc. for Maryland Department of the Environment, M&T Bank and other tenants.

Montgomery Ward Warehouse and Retail Store was listed on the National Register of Historic Places in 2000.

== Gallery ==
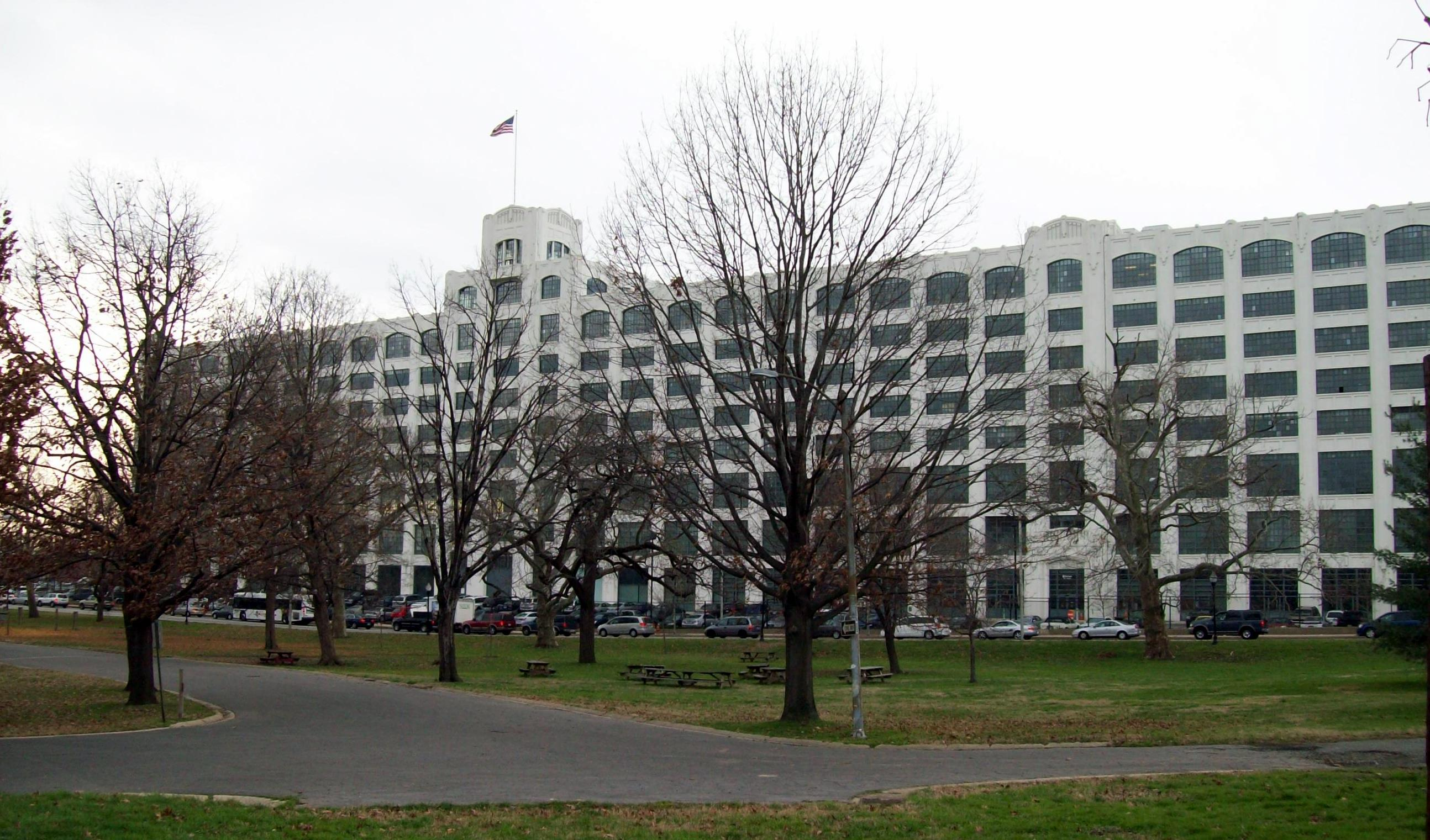
Montgomery Ward Warehouse and Retail Store, December 2011
