= History of Baltimore =

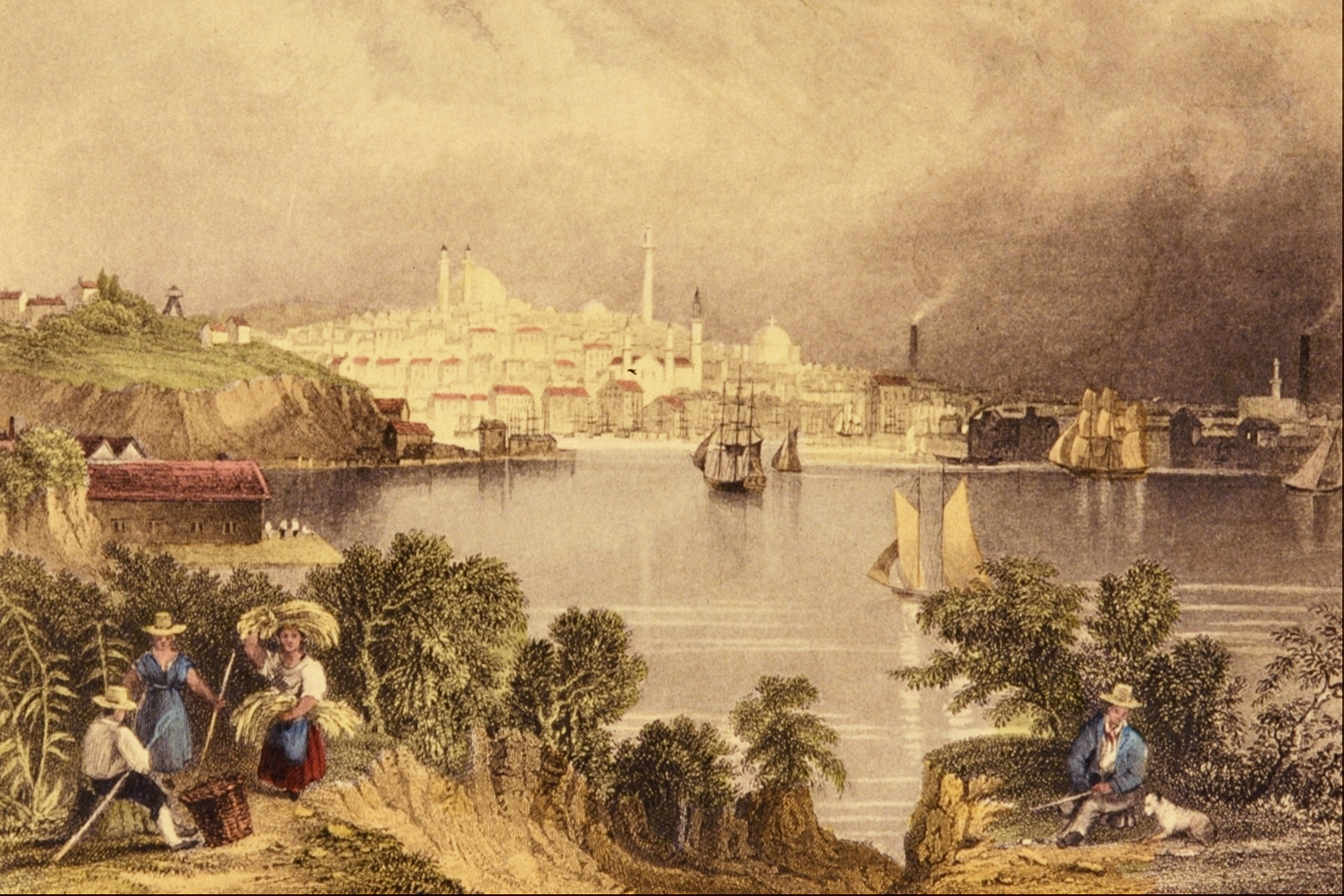
View of Baltimore by William Henry Bartlett (1809–1854)

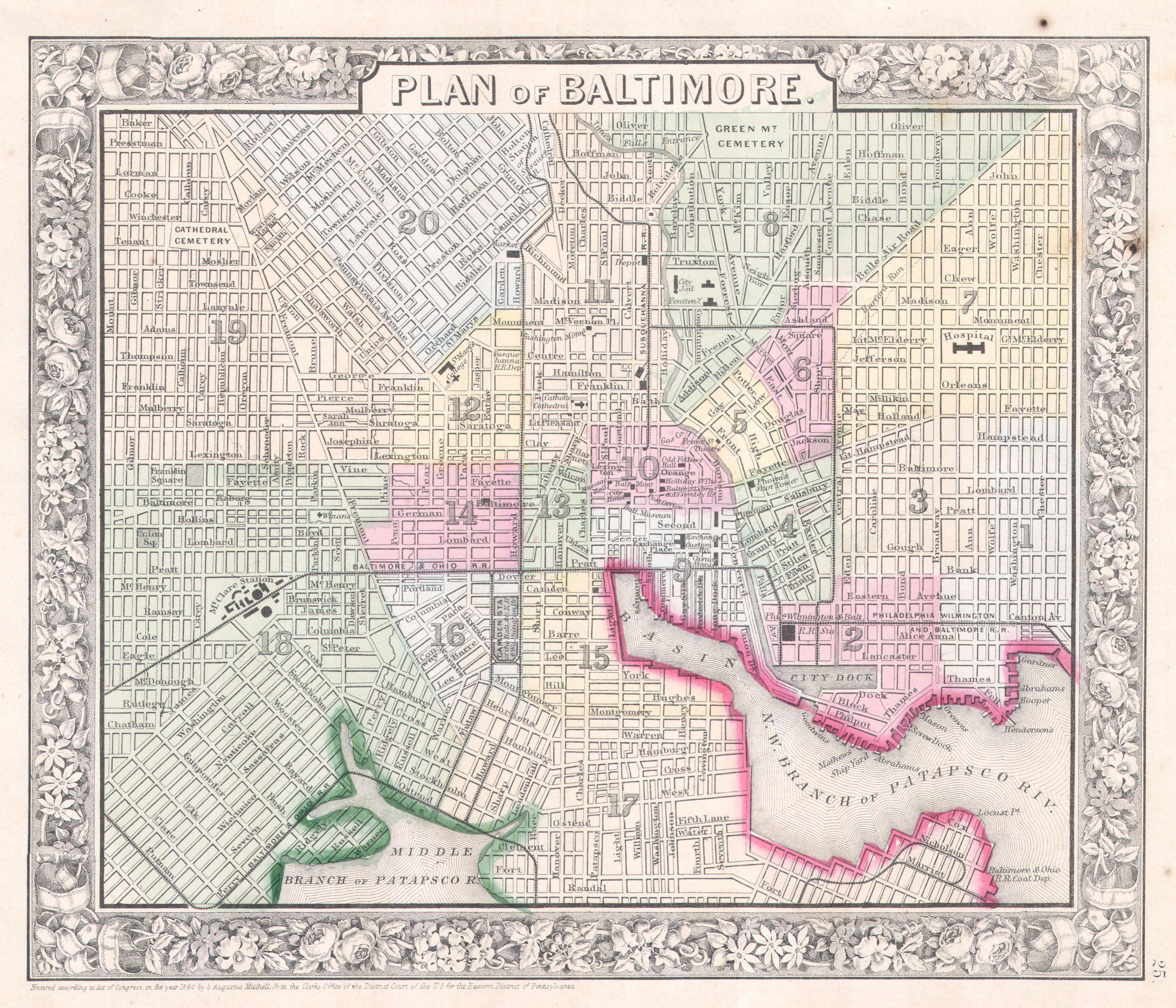
An 1864 map of Baltimore

The history of Baltimore spans back to 1659, when the Baltimore County was declared erected by the General Assembly of Maryland. The area where the city now lays was settled by David Jones in 1661. While this has been inhabited by Indigenous people since the 10th millennium BCE, it was not until European settlers arrived that it was given the name Baltimore, after the Province of Maryland's founding proprietor.

The city of Baltimore was founded in 1729. Early on, it was largely populated by German immigrants. The city gained prominence as a major hub for trade and commerce after successfully fending off British forces during the War of 1812. Seeing to maintain this position, the Baltimore & Ohio Railroad was established in 1829, making it one of the first commercial railroad lines in the world.

Before the Civil War, Baltimore was home to the largest free Black community in the U.S. It became known as a "city of refuge" and a destination for many former slaves, including Frederick Douglass. However, the city's growing Black population caused unease among white residents, leading to increased racial tensions after the war.

Baltimore has been the site of early organization for social movements, including women's suffrage and the civil rights movement of the 20th century.

== Native American settlement ==
The Baltimore area had been inhabited by Native Americans since at least the 10th millennium BC, when Paleo-Indians first settled in the region. One Paleo-Indian site and several Archaic period and Woodland period archaeological sites have been identified in Baltimore, including four from the Late Woodland period.

During the Late Woodland period, the archaeological culture known as the "Potomac Creek complex" resided in an area from Baltimore to the Rappahannock River in Virginia, primarily along the Potomac River downstream from the Fall Line.

In the early 17th century, the immediate Baltimore vicinity was populated by Native Americans. The Baltimore County area northward was used as hunting grounds by the Susquehannocks living in the lower Susquehanna River valley who "controlled all of the upper tributaries of the Chesapeake" but "refrained from much contact with Powhatan in the Potomac region." Pressured by the Susquehannocks, the Piscataway tribe of Algonquians stayed well south of the Baltimore area and inhabited primarily the north bank of the Potomac River in what is now Charles and southern Prince George's south of the Fall Line as depicted on John Smith's 1608 map which faithfully mapped settlements, mapped none in the Baltimore vicinity, while noting a dozen Patuxent River settlements that were under some degree of Piscataway suzerainty.

In 1608, Captain John Smith traveled 210 mi (340 km) from Jamestown to the uppermost Chesapeake Bay, leading the first European expedition to the Patapsco River, a word used by the Algonquin language natives who fished shellfish and hunted The name "Patapsco" is derived from pota-psk-ut, which translates to "backwater" or "tide covered with froth" in Algonquian dialect.

A quarter-century after John Smith's voyage, Cecil Calvert, 2nd Baron Baltimore led 140 colonists on the merchantman The Ark to settle in North America. The colonists were initially frightened by the Piscataway in southern Maryland because of their body paint and war regalia, incorrectly assuming they wished to attack the fledgling colonial settlement. However, the chief of the Piscataway tribe was quick to grant the colonists permission to settle within Piscataway territory and cordial relations were established between them and the Piscataway.

== European settlement ==
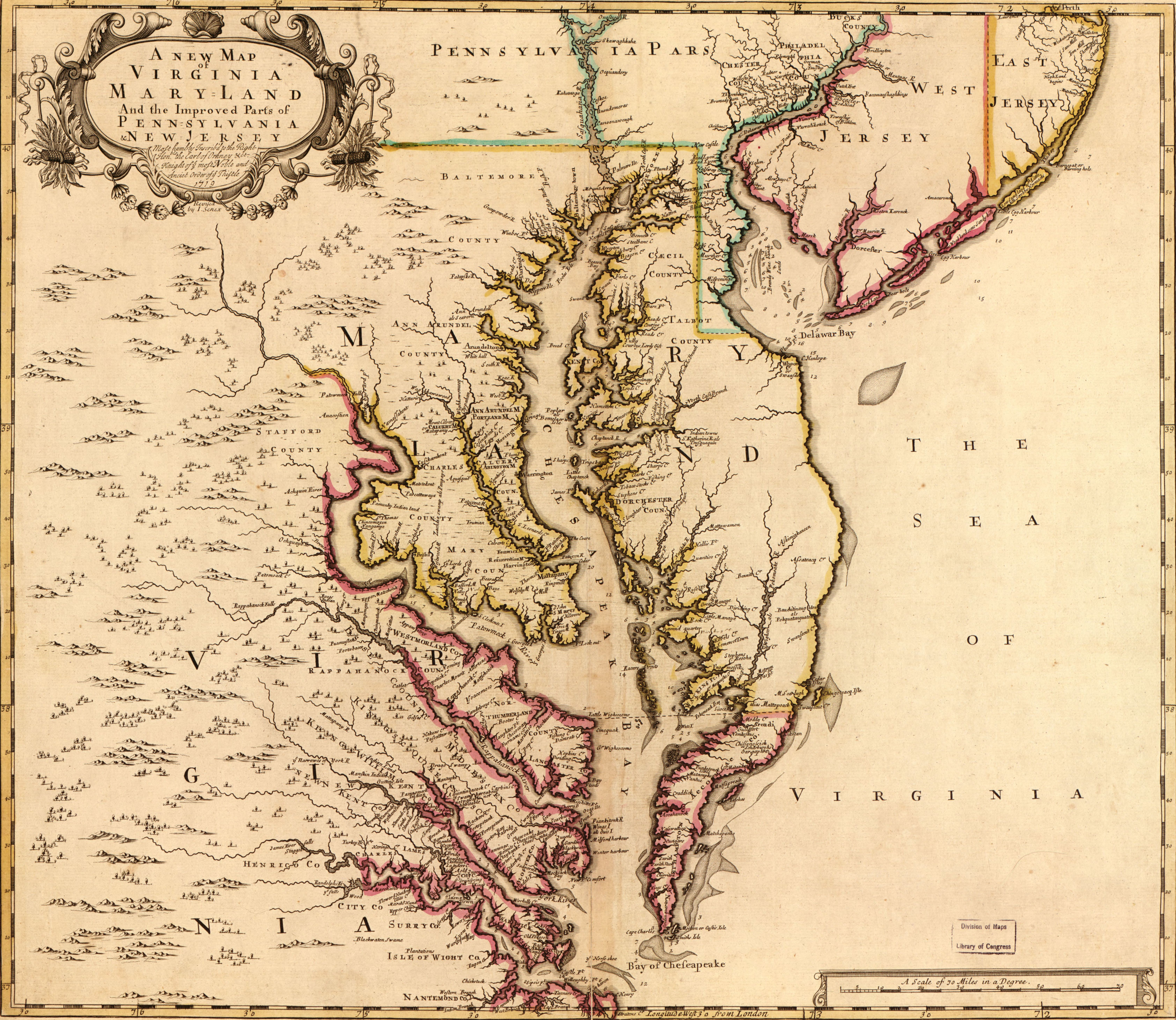
Map of Chesapeake Bay area by John Senex, 1719, with Baltimore County labeled near Maryland's border with Pennsylvania.

Baltimore city is named for Cecil Calvert, second Lord Baltimore, (1605–1675), of the Irish House of Lords and founding proprietor of the Province of Maryland. Cecilius Calvert was the oldest son of Sir George Calvert, (1579–1632), who became the First Lord Baltimore of County Longford, Ireland in 1625. Previously, he had been a loyal agent of King Charles I of England (1600–1649) as his Secretary of State until declaring himself a follower of Roman Catholicism. Regardless, the King still gave his heir Cecil the 1632 grant for the Maryland colony, named after Charles's wife, Queen Henrietta Maria. The colony was a followup to his earlier settlement in Newfoundland, known as "Acadia" or "Avalon", (future Canada), which he found too cold and difficult for habitation.

The County of Baltimore was "erected" around 1659 in the records of the General Assembly of Maryland one of the earliest divisions of the Maryland Colony into counties when a warrant was issued to be served by the "Sheriff of Baltimore County." The area constituting the modern City of Baltimore and its metropolitan area was settled by David Jones in 1661, his claim covering in the area known today as Harbor East on the east bank of the Jones Falls river, which flows south into Baltimore's Inner Harbor. The following year, shipwright Charles Gorsuch settled Whetstone Point, the present location of Fort McHenry. In 1665, the west side of the Jones Falls on the Inner Harbor was settled when 550 acres of land, thereafter named Cole's Harbor, was granted to Thomas Cole and later sold to David Jones in 1679. Old Saint Paul's Parish of Baltimore County was one of the "Original Thirty" parishes designated for the Colony. It included the county of Baltimore and the future Baltimore Town and was part of the "established" or "state" Church of England, also known as the Anglican Church. It was the first church built in the metro area, erected in 1692 on the Patapsco Neck peninsula in southeastern Baltimore County, along the Colgate Creek which flowed into the Patapsco River (present site of today's Dundalk Marine Terminal of the Port of Baltimore). Jones's stepson James Todd resurveyed Cole's Harbor in 1696. The tract was renamed Todd's Range, which was then sold off in progressively smaller parcels, thereby forming the land that would become the Town of Baltimore thirty years later.

Another "Baltimore" existed on the Bush River as early as 1674. That first county seat of Baltimore County is known today as "Old Baltimore". It was located on the Bush River on land that in 1773 became part of Harford County. In 1674, the General Assembly passed "An Act for erecting a Court-house and Prison in each County within this Province." The site of the courthouse and jail for Baltimore County was evidently "Old Baltimore" near the Bush River. In 1683, the General Assembly passed "An Act for Advancement of Trade" to "establish towns, ports, and places of trade, within the province." One of the towns established by the act in Baltimore County was "on Bush River, on Town Land, near the Court-House." The courthouse on the Bush River referenced in the 1683 Act was in all likelihood the one created by the 1674 Act. "Old Baltimore" was in existence as early as 1674, but we don't know with certainty what if anything happened on the site prior to that year. The exact location of Old Baltimore was lost for years. It was certain that the location was somewhere on the site of the present-day Aberdeen Proving Ground (APG), a U.S. Army testing facility. in the 1990s, APG's Cultural Resource Management Program took up the task of finding Old Baltimore. The firm of R. Christopher Goodwin & Associates was contracted for the project. After Goodwin first performed historical and archival work, they coordinated their work with existing landscape features to locate the site of Old Baltimore. APG's Explosive Ordnance Disposal personnel went in with Goodwin to defuse any unexploded ordnance. Working in 1997 and 1998, the field team uncovered building foundations, trash pits, faunal remains, and 17,000 artifacts, largely from the 17th century. The Bush River proved to be an unfortunate location because the port became silted and impassable to ships, forcing the port facilities to relocate. By the time Baltimore on the Patapsco River was established in 1729, Old Baltimore Town had faded away.

Maryland's colonial General Assembly created and authorized the Port of Baltimore in 1706 at the Head of the Northwest Branch of the Patapsco River in what was later known as "the Basin" (today's Inner Harbor) and later expanded east and southeast down-river to the settlement later known as Fells Point to the east near the mouth of the Jones Falls and further in the nineteenth century to what became known as Canton.

The Port of Baltimore began to take shape in the mid-eighteenth century. While Thomas Cole owned the parcel at the northwest of the Patapsco River, he had not yet settled it. William and Edward Fells negotiated a good price for the unused land and developed the harbor in the 1740s. This port attracted traffic from southern Pennsylvania and western Maryland.

Also around the Basin to the southeast along the southern peninsula which ended at Whetstone Point—today South Baltimore, Federal Hill, and Locust Point—the funding for new wharves and slips came from individual wealthy ship-owners and brokers and from the public authorities through the town commissioners by means of lotteries, for the tobacco trade and shipping of other raw materials overseas to the Mother Country, for receiving manufactured goods from England, and for trade with other ports being established up and down the Chesapeake Bay and in the other burgeoning colonies along the Atlantic coast.

=== Early development of Baltimore Town: 1729–1796 ===
The Maryland General Assembly established the Town of Baltimore in 1729. Unlike many other towns established around that time, Baltimore was more than just existence on paper. German immigrants began to settle along the Chesapeake Bay by 1723, living in the Baltimore area. The General Assembly enlarged Baltimore Town in 1745 and incorporated David Jones's original settlement known as Jones Town. Baltimore sent representatives to the Assembly, and over the next two decades it acquired nine parcels of land and annexed neighboring villages including Fells Point to become an important community on the head of the Patapsco River. As the Town grew, increasing numbers of German Lutheran immigrants established Zion Church in 1755, and later also a German Reformed congregation was organized as the first among the Protestants to be represented which also attracted more of these "Pennsylvania Dutch" settlers to the region. Early German settlers also later established the German Society of Maryland in 1783 in order to foster the German language and German culture in Baltimore.

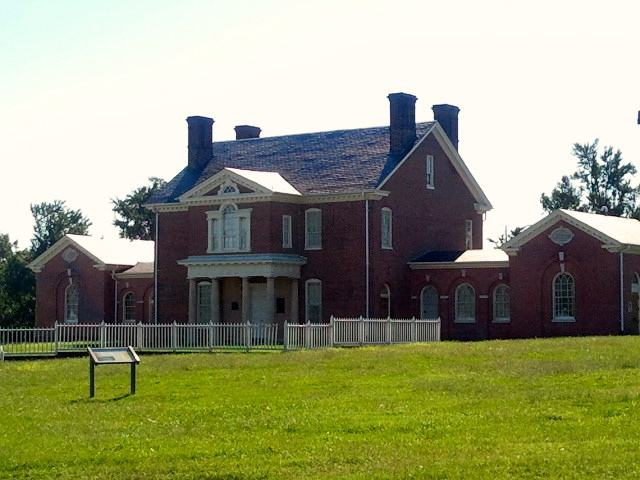
Mount Clare Mansion, known today as the Mount Clare Museum House, is the oldest Colonial-era structure in Baltimore.

The first printing press was introduced to the city in 1765 by a German immigrant, Nicholas Hasselbach, whose equipment was later used in the printing of Baltimore's first newspapers, The Maryland Journal and The Baltimore Advertiser, first published by William Goddard in 1773.

Baltimore grew from a village of 250 people in 1752 to the fourth largest city in the United States in 1790. Driving this rapid urbanization were wheat exports and wartime profiteering. While early Maryland had been a tobacco-producing colony, increased demand for imported food to the cash-crop producing British Caribbean colonies induced wheat exported from Maryland though the emerging port of Baltimore. In addition, the Seven Years War dampened demand for tobacco, which favored the products moving through Baltimore. The Revolutionary War favored the port of Baltimore as well. British occupations of Boston, New York, and Philadelphia shifted shipping to and from Baltimore. Even some Pennsylvania Quaker millers moved to Baltimore to avoid British harassment.

Throughout the 18th Century, Baltimore drained and filled in marshes (notably Thomas "Harrison's Marsh" along the Jones Falls west bank), built canals around the falls and through the center of town, built bridges across the Falls and annexed neighboring Jones's Town to the northeast in 1745 and expanded southeastward towards the neighboring, bustling, shipbuilding port at Fells Point. It became by far the largest city in the Middle Atlantic colonies between Philadelphia and Charleston, South Carolina. A political deal by the increasingly powerful financial interests in the growing town and with the rapidly growing population was reached and the county seat with its important center of a courthouse for all Baltimore County was moved from Old Joppa over its citizens enraged protests. Baltimoreans paid some 300 pounds sterling the next year to erect a fine brick courthouse with a bell tower and steeple on a Courthouse Square (future Calvert Street, between East Lexington and Fayette Streets) along with the necessary "whipping post", stocks (for confining heads and arms), podium for making public announcements and news, and a nearby jail, on the northern hills overlooking the harbor basin and with its back sitting over a rugged cliff and bluffs to the northeast with "Steiger's Meadow" bordering the twisting loop of the Jones Falls which bent southwestward before running north again.

During the American Revolution, the Second Continental Congress temporarily fled from Philadelphia and held sessions in Baltimore between December 1776 and February 1777. When the Continental Congress authorized the privateering of British merchantmen, eager Baltimore merchants accepted the challenge, and as the war progressed, the shipbuilding industry expanded and boomed. There was no major military action near the city though, except for the passing nearby and a feint towards the town by a Royal Navy fleet as they headed north up the Chesapeake Bay to land an army at Head of Elk in the northeast corner to march on the American capital at Philadelphia and the following battles at Brandywine and Germantown.

The American Revolution stimulated the domestic market for wheat and iron ore, and in Baltimore, flour milling increased along the Jones and Gwynns Falls. Iron ore transport greatly boosted the local economy. The British naval blockade hurt Baltimore's shipping, but also freed merchants and traders from British debts, which along with the capture of British merchant vessels furthered Baltimore's economic growth. By 1800 Baltimore had become one of the major cities of the new republic.

The economic foundations laid down between 1763 and 1776 were vital to the even greater expansion seen during the Revolutionary War. Though still lagging behind Philadelphia, Baltimore merchants and entrepreneurs produced an expanding commercial community with family businesses and partnerships proliferating in shipping, the flour-milling and grain business, and the indentured servant traffic. International trade focused on four areas: Britain, Southern Europe, the West Indies, and the North American coastal towns. Credit was the essence of the system and a virtual chain of indebtedness meant that bills remained long unpaid and little cash was used among overseas correspondents, merchant wholesalers, and retail customers. Bills of exchange were used extensively, often circulating as currency. Frequent crises of credit and the wars with France kept prices and markets in constant flux, but men such as William Lux and the Christie brothers produced a maturing economy and a thriving metropolis by the 1770s.

The population reached 14,000 in 1790, but the decade was a rough one for the city. The Bank of England's suspension of specie payments caused the network of Atlantic credit to unravel, leading to a mild recession. The Quasi-War with France in 1798-1800 caused major disruptions to Baltimore's trade in the Caribbean. Finally, a yellow fever epidemic diverted ships from the port, while much of the urban population fled into the countryside. The downturn widened to include every social class and area of economic activity. In response, the business community diversified away from an economy based heavily on foreign trade.

Rapid economic expansion in the area preceded the layout of the town of Baltimore, covering a total of four decades. Baltimore replaced the tobacco economy with wheat and iron as its chief goods. Baltimore shipped iron to England and wheat to English sugar colonies in the Caribbean. Several streams over falls lines served as ideal sites for flour mills, and the head of the Patapsco River was the closest point of navigation for shipping flour overseas. Likewise, furnaces were being developed in the region, so iron shipped overseas through the Baltimore and the Patapsco.

== Baltimore City before the Civil War: 1797–1861 ==
Population growth
Year	1790	1800	1810	1820	1830	1840	1850	1860	1870	1880	1890
Population	14,000	27,000	47,000	63,000	81,000	102,000	169,000	212,000	267,000	332,000	434,000

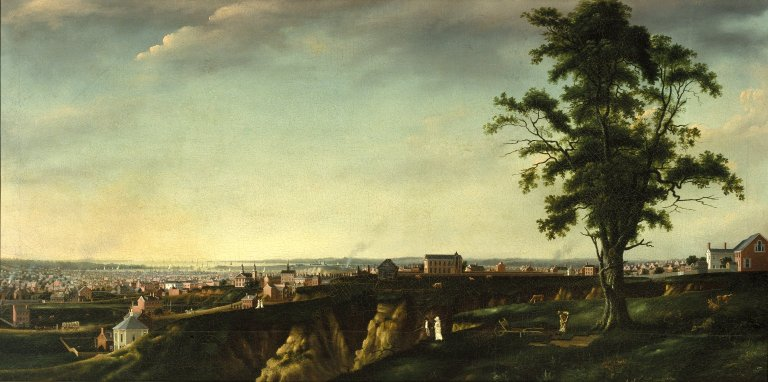
View of Baltimore from Chapel Hill, by Francis Guy, 1802-03 (Brooklyn Museum)

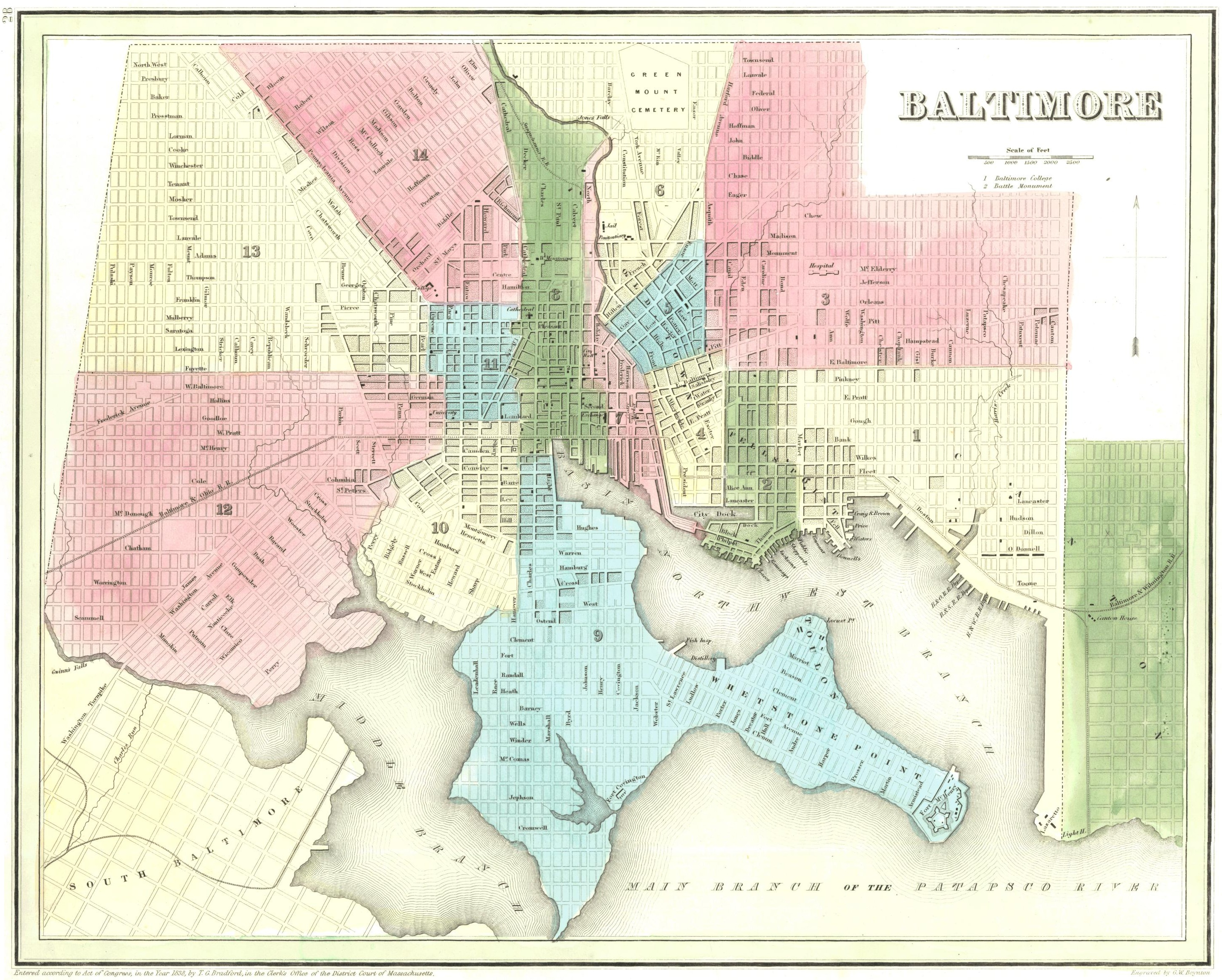
Baltimore Street Map, 1838

In 1797, Baltimore Town merged with Fell's Point and incorporated as the City of Baltimore. Baltimore grew rapidly, becoming the largest city in the Southern United States. It dominated the American flour trade after 1800 due to the milling technology of Oliver Evans, the introduction of steam power in processing, and the merchant-millers' development of drying processes which greatly slowed spoilage. Still, by 1830 New York City's competition was felt keenly, and Baltimoreans were hard-pressed to match the merchantability standards despite more rigorous inspection controls than earlier, nor could they match the greater financial resources of their northern rivals.

The city was the site of the Battle of Baltimore during the War of 1812. After burning Washington, D.C., the British attacked Baltimore outside the eastern outskirts of town on the "Patapsco Neck" on September 12, at the Battle of North Point, then on the night of September 13–14, 1814. United States forces from Fort McHenry successfully defended the city's harbor from the British.

Francis Scott Key, (1779–1843), a Maryland lawyer from Georgetown and Frederick, was aboard a British ship where he had been negotiating for the release of an American prisoner, Dr. William Beanes. Key witnessed the bombardment from this ship and after seeing the huge American flag on the morning of September 14, 1814, he wrote "The Star-Spangled Banner", a poem recounting the attack. Key's poem was set to a 1780 drinking song by British composer John Stafford Smith, and "The Star-Spangled Banner" became the official national anthem of the United States in 1931.

In the wake of the War of 1812, residents expected the city to become America's leading cultural and commercial center and the literary community dubbed their city "the Rome of the United States". The number of Baltimore printers, publishers, and booksellers had doubled in the preceding years. Between 1816 and 1825, Baltimore's literary focal point was the Delphian Club. Twelve newspapers had editors in the Club and the club's sixteen members published at least 48 books of fiction, history, travel, letters, and biography, as well as nine volumes of poetry, one play, and nineteen speeches. The club's organ was The Portico literary magazine.

A distinctive local culture started to take shape, and a unique skyline peppered with churches and monuments developed. Baltimore acquired its moniker "The Monumental City" after an 1827 visit to Baltimore by President John Quincy Adams. At an evening function, Adams gave the following toast: "Baltimore: the Monumental City—May the days of her safety be as prosperous and happy, as the days of her dangers have been trying and triumphant."

=== Finance ===
Alexander Brown (1764–1834), a Protestant immigrant from Ireland, came to the city in 1800 and set up a linen business with his sons. Soon the firm Alex. Brown & Sons moved into cotton and, to a lesser extent, shipping. Brown's sons opened branches in Liverpool, Philadelphia, and New York. The firm was an enthusiastic supporter of the B&O Railroad. By 1850 it was the leading foreign exchange house in the United States. Brown was a business innovator who observed social conditions carefully and was a transition figure to the era after 1819 when cash and short credits became the norms of business relations. By concentrating his capital in small-risk ventures and acquiring ships and Bank of the United States stock during the Panic of 1819, he came to monopolize Baltimore's shipping trade with Liverpool by 1822. Brown next expanded into packet ships, extended his lines to Philadelphia and began financing Baltimore importers, specializing in merchant banking from the late 1820s to his death in 1834. The emergence of a money economy and the growth of the Anglo-American cotton trade allowed him to escape Baltimore's declining position in trans-Atlantic trade. His most important innovation was the drawing up of his own bills of exchange. By 1830 his company rivaled the Bank of the United States in the American foreign exchange markets, and the transition from the 'traditional' to the 'modern' merchant was nearly complete. It became the nation's first investment bank. It was sold in 1997, but the name lives on as Deutsche Bank Alex. Brown, a division of Germany's Deutsche Bank.

=== Baltimore & Ohio Railroad established ===
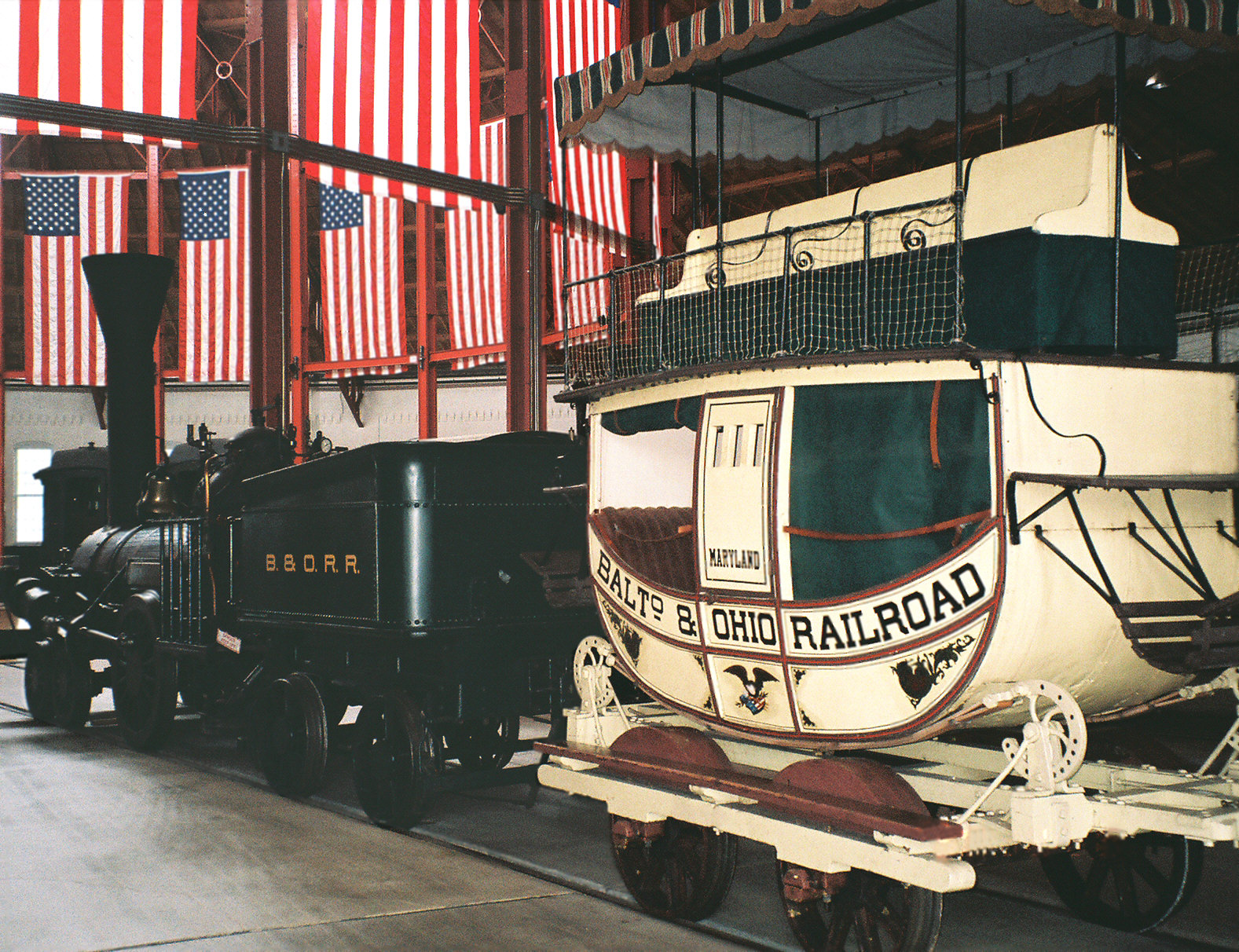
Baltimore & Ohio Railroad engine and passenger car from the 1830s.

Baltimore faced economic stagnation unless it opened routes to the western states, as New York had done with the Erie Canal in 1820. In 1827, twenty-five merchants and bankers studied the best means of restoring "that portion of the Western trade which has recently been diverted from it by the introduction of steam navigation." Their answer was to build a railroad—one of the first commercial lines in the world. The Baltimore and Ohio Railroad (B&O) became the first chartered railroad in the United States; twenty thousand investors purchased $1.5 million in stock to import the rolling stock and build the line, and the city and state governments invested the remaining $1.5 million of the company's $3 million capitalization. It was a commercial and financial success and invented many new managerial methods that became standard practice in railroading and modern business. The B&O became the first company to operate a locomotive built in America, with the Tom Thumb in 1829. It built the first passenger and freight station (Mount Clare in 1829) and was the first railroad that earned passenger revenues (December 1829), and published a timetable (May 23, 1830). On December 24, 1852, it became the first rail line to reach the Ohio River from the eastern seaboard. The railroad was merged into its former rival, the Chesapeake and Ohio (C&O), to create "The Chessie System Railroad." The Chessie System merged with the Seaboard System Railroad to create CSX in 1987, with the letters "CSX" referring to "Chessie," Seaboard," and "much more to come."

Following the B&O's start of regular operations in 1830, other railroads were built in the city. In the early 1830s the Baltimore and Port Deposit Rail Road began running trains in the Canton area, and later in the decade it reached Havre de Grace. Also in the 1830s, the Baltimore and Susquehanna Railroad operated trains initially to Owings Mills, and later into Pennsylvania. Both lines were later controlled by the Pennsylvania Railroad. In the mid-1850s the Western Maryland Railway began constructing a line to Westminster and points west, reaching Hagerstown in 1872.

The Baltimore-Washington telegraph line was established along a B&O route in 1843–44.

=== Free and enslaved labor ===
From the late 18th century into the 1820s Baltimore was a "city of transients," a fast-growing boom town attracting thousands of ex-slaves from the surrounding countryside. Slavery in Maryland declined steadily after the 1810s as the state's economy shifted away from plantation agriculture, as evangelicalism and a liberal manumission law encouraged slaveholders to free enslaved people held in bondage, and as other slaveholders practiced "term slavery," registering deeds of manumission but postponing the actual date of freedom for a decade or more. Baltimore's shrinking population of enslaved people often lived and worked alongside the city's growing free black population as "quasi-freedmen." With unskilled and semiskilled employment readily available in the shipyards and related industries, little friction with white workers occurred. Despite the overall poverty of the city's free blacks, compared with the condition of those living in Philadelphia, Charleston, and New Orleans, Baltimore was a "city of refuge," where enslaved and free blacks alike found an unusual amount of freedom. Churches, schools, and fraternal and benevolent associations provided a cushion against hardening white attitudes toward free people of color in the wake of Nat Turner's revolt in Virginia in 1831. But a flood of German and Irish immigrants swamped Baltimore's labor market after 1840, driving free blacks deeper into poverty.

The Maryland Chemical Works of Baltimore used a mix of free labor, hired slave labor, and enslaved people held by the corporation to work in its factory. Since chemicals needed constant attention, the rapid turnover of free white labor encouraged the owner to use enslaved workers. While slave labor was about 20 percent cheaper, the company began to reduce its dependence on enslaved labor in 1829 when two slaves ran away and one died.

The location of Baltimore in a border state created opportunities for enslaved people in the city to run away and find freedom in the north—as Frederick Douglass did. Therefore, slaveholders in Baltimore frequently turned to gradual manumission as a means to secure dependable and productive labor from slaves. In promising freedom after a fixed period of years, slaveholders intended to reduce the costs associated with lifetime servitude while providing slaves incentive for cooperation. Enslaved people tried to negotiate terms of manumission that were more advantageous, and the implicit threat of flight weighed significantly in slaveholders' calculations. The dramatic decrease in the enslaved population during 1850-60 indicates that slavery was no longer profitable in the city. Slaves were still used as expensive house servants: it was cheaper to hire a free worker by the day, with the option of dropping him or replacing him with a better worker, rather than run the expense of maintaining a slave month in and month out with little flexibility.

On the eve of the Civil War, Baltimore had the largest free black community in the nation. About 15 schools for black people were operating, including Sabbath schools operated by Methodists, Presbyterians, and Quakers, along with several private academies. All black schools were self-sustaining, receiving no state or local government funds, and whites in Baltimore generally opposed educating the black population, continuing to tax black property holders to maintain schools from which black children were excluded by law. Baltimore's black community, nevertheless, was one of the largest and most divided in America due to this experience.

=== Know-Nothing Party and Baltimore politics ===
Baltimore in the Third Party System had two-party competitive elections, with powerful bosses, carefully orchestrated political violence, and an emerging working-class consciousness at the polls. The fierce politics of the 1850s had galvanized the white workers, most of them German, who opposed slavery. The American Party emerged in the mid-1850s to represent Protestants and to counter the Democratic Party, which was increasingly controlled by Catholic Irish. When Baltimore erupted in violence at the time of President Abraham Lincoln's 1861 inauguration, for example, the pro-Union "Blood Tubs" that took to the streets were veterans of political rioting. The nativist American (Know-Nothing) Party captured the Baltimore government in 1854. The party promoted modernization, including professionalizing police and fire departments, expanding the courts, and upgrading the water supply. The party used patronage and, especially, coercion and election-day violence; its armed gangs scared off Democratic voters, but the Irish and Germans fought back. Voters elected a congressman and governor nominated by the party during its short life. In 1860 the Democrat-controlled legislature took back the city police, the militia, patronage, and the electoral machinery, and prosecuted some Know-Nothings for electoral fraud. By 1861 the Know-Nothings had split over secession.

== Baltimore during and after the Civil War: 1861–1894 ==
=== Baltimore plot ===
Because of fear of assassination while passing through Baltimore on the way to his inauguration, Lincoln separated from his family and traveled through Baltimore first, in the middle of the night. Whether the plot existed is disputed, but Lincoln and his security escort from the Pinkerton Agency believed that the danger could not be safely ignored.

=== Civil War ===
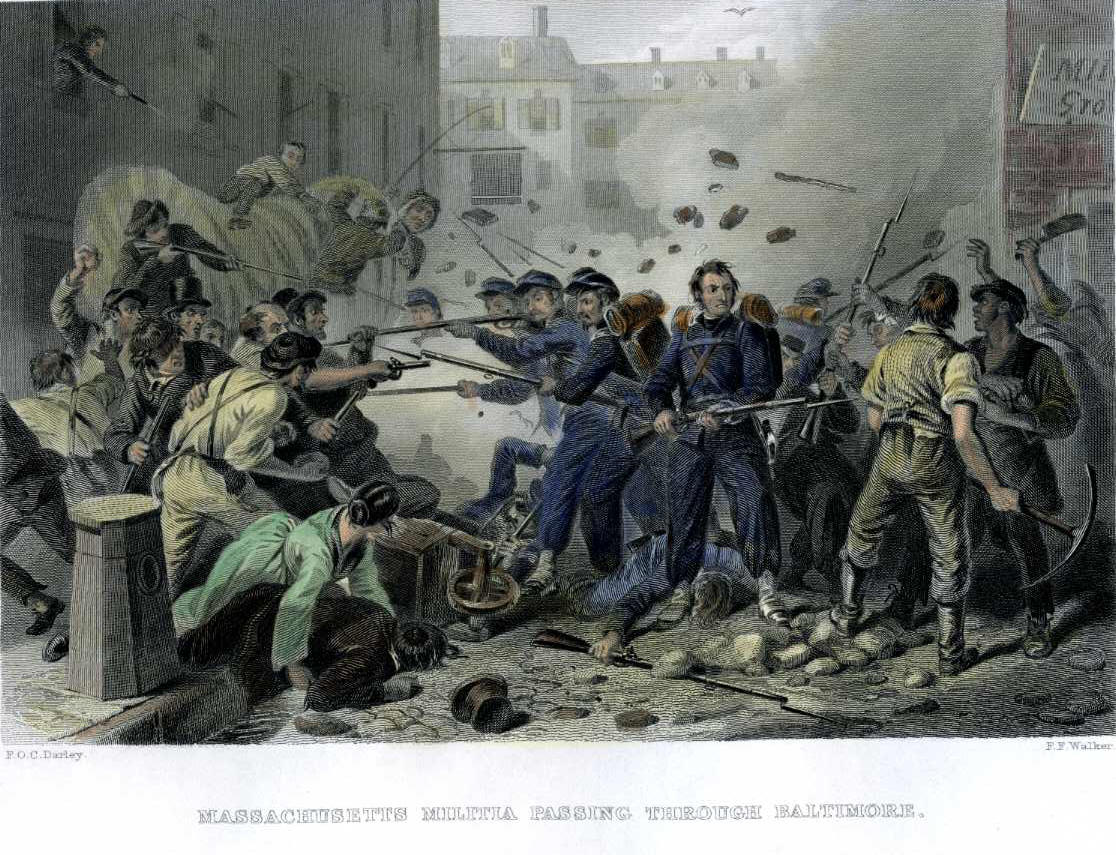
The Baltimore riot of 1861

The Civil War divided Baltimore and Maryland's residents. Much of the social and political elite favored the Confederacy—and indeed owned house slaves. In the 1860 election the city's large German element voted not for Lincoln but for Southern Democrat John C. Breckinridge. They were less concerned with the abolition of slavery, an issue emphasized by Republicans, and much more with nativism, temperance, and religious beliefs, associated with the Know-Nothing Party and strongly opposed by the Democrats. However the Germans hated slavery and supported the Union.

When Union soldiers from the 6th Massachusetts Militia and some unarmed Pennsylvania state militia known as the "Washington Brigade" from Philadelphia with their band marched through the city at the start of the war, Confederate sympathizers attacked the troops, which led to the first bloodshed in the Civil War during the Baltimore riot of 1861. Four soldiers and twelve civilians were killed during the riot, which caused Union troops to later occupy Baltimore in May under Gen. Benjamin F. Butler of Massachusetts. Maryland came under direct federal administration—in part, to prevent the state from seceding—until the end of the war in April 1865.

When Massachusetts troops marched through the city on April 19, 1861, en route to Washington, D.C., a rebel mob attacked; 4 soldiers and 12 rioters were dead, and 36 soldiers and uncounted rioters had been injured. Governor Thomas Hicks realized action needed to be taken. He convened a special session of the General Assembly but moved its location to a site in Frederick, a distance from the secessionist groups. In doing this and by other actions, Hicks managed to neutralize the General Assembly to avoid Maryland's secession from the Union, becoming a hero in the eyes of the Unionists in the state. Meanwhile, pro-Confederate gangs burned the bridges connecting Baltimore and Washington to the North, and cut the telegraph lines. Lincoln sent in federal troops under Gen. Ben Butler; they seized the city, imposed martial law, and arrested leading Confederate spokesmen. The prisoners were later released and the rail lines reopened, making Baltimore a major Union base during the war.

=== African Americans after the Civil War ===
Maryland was not subject to Reconstruction, but the end of slavery meant heightened racial tensions as free blacks flocked to the city and many armed confrontations erupted between blacks and whites. Rural blacks who flocked to Baltimore created increased competition for skilled jobs and upset the prewar relationship between free blacks and whites. As black migrants were relegated to unskilled work or no work at all, violent strikes erupted. Denied entry into the regular state militia, armed blacks formed militias of their own. In the midst of this change, white Baltimoreans interpreted black discontent as disrespect for law and order, which justified police repression.

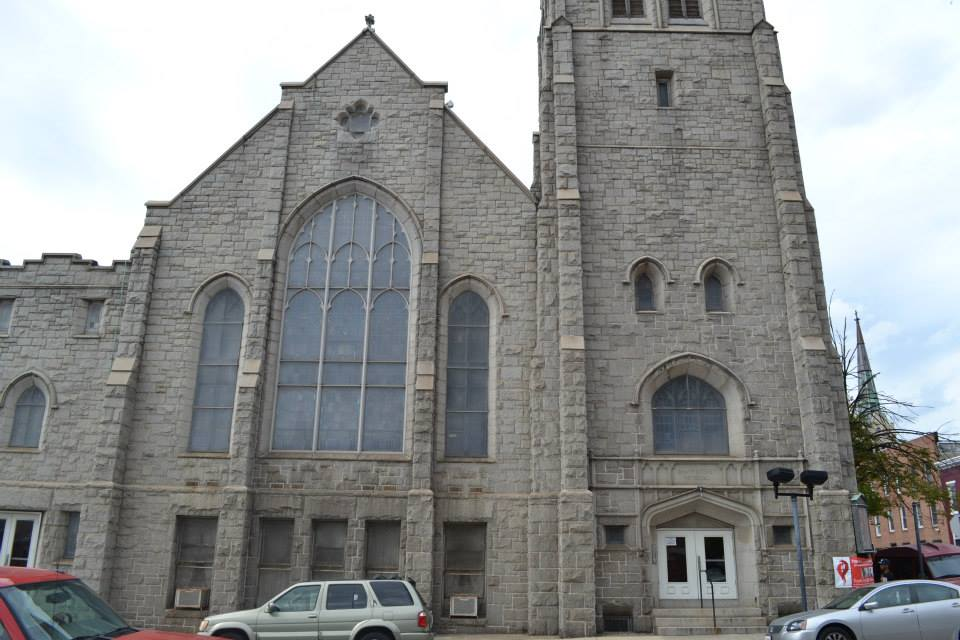
Sharp Street Church was established 1787, the existing building having been erected in 1898

Baltimore had a larger population of African Americans than any northern city. The new Maryland state constitution of 1864 ended slavery and provided for the education of all children, including blacks. The Baltimore Association for the Moral and Educational Improvement of the Colored People established schools for blacks that were taken over by the public school system, which then restricted education for blacks beginning in 1867 when Democrats regained control of the city. Establishing an unequal system that prepared white students for citizenship while using education to reinforce black subjugation, Baltimore's postwar school system exposed the contradictions of race, education, and republicanism in an age when African Americans struggled to realize the ostensible freedoms gained by emancipation. Thus blacks found themselves forced to support Jim Crow legislation and urged that the "colored schools" be staffed only with black teachers. From 1867 to 1900 black schools grew from 10 to 27 and enrollment from 901 to 9,383. The Mechanical and Industrial Association achieved success only in 1892 with the opening of the Colored Manual Training School. Black leaders were convinced by the Rev. William Alexander and his newspaper, the Afro American, that economic advancement and first-class citizenship depended on equal access to schools.

=== Economic growth ===
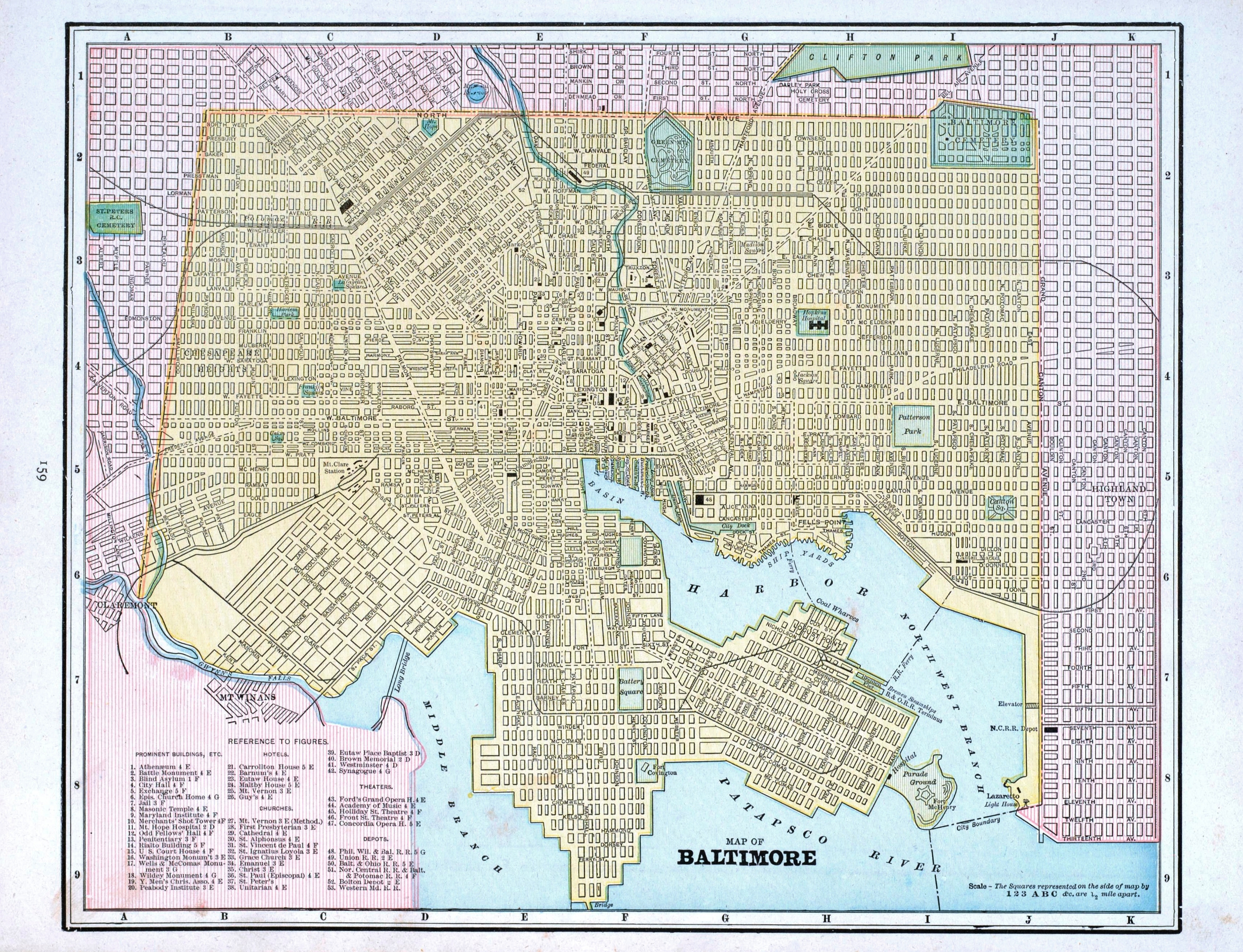
Baltimore Street Map, 1892

By 1880 manufacturing replaced trade and made the city a nationally important industrial center. The port continued to ship increasing amounts of grain, flour, tobacco, and raw cotton to Europe. The new industries of men's clothing, canning, tin and sheet-iron ware products, foundry and machine shop products, cars, and tobacco manufacture had the largest labor force and largest product value.

The construction of new housing was a major factor in Baltimore's economy. Vill (1986) examines the activities of major builders between 1869 and 1896, especially as they gained access to building land and capital. Most, but not all, of the major builders were craftsmen who were entrepreneurs compared with others in the building trades, but were still small businessmen who built small numbers of houses during long careers. They worked with landowners, and both groups manipulated the city's leasehold system to their own advantage. Builders obtained credit from a diverse array of sources, including sellers of land, building societies, and land companies. The most important source was individual lenders, who lent money in small amounts either on their own account or through lawyers and trustees overseeing funds held in trust. In spite of their important role in shaping the city, the contractors were small businessmen who rarely achieved citywide visibility. Until the 1890s, Baltimore remained a patchwork of nationalities with white natives, German and Irish immigrants, and black Baltimoreans scattered throughout the 'social quilt' in heterogeneous neighborhoods.

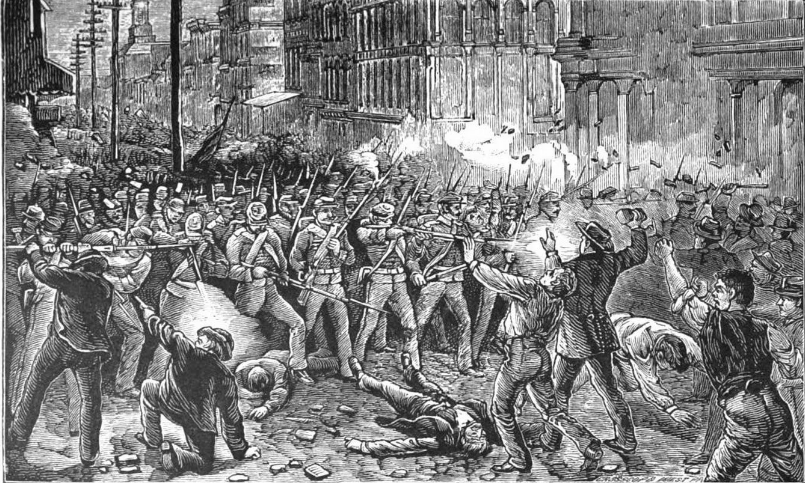
Baltimore railroad strike of 1877

Baltimore was the origin of a major railroad workers' strike in 1877 when the B&O company attempted to lower wages. On July 20, 1877, Maryland Governor John Lee Carroll called up the 5th and 6th Regiments of the National Guard to end the strikes, which had disrupted train service at Cumberland in western Maryland. Citizens sympathetic to the railroad workers attacked the National Guard troops as they marched from their armories in Baltimore to Camden Station. Soldiers from the 6th Regiment fired on the crowd, killing 10 and wounding 25. Rioters then damaged B&O trains and burned portions of the rail station. Order was restored in the city on July 21–22 when federal troops arrived to protect railroad property and end the strike.

=== YWCA ===
An expanded economic activity brought many immigrants from the countryside and from Europe after the Civil War. Concerns for young, single Protestant women alone in cities led to the growth of the Young Women's Christian Association (YWCA) movement. When the Baltimore YWCA was founded in 1883, they only offered their services to white women and so the Colored Women's YWCA was founded in 1896. They merged in 1920.

== Progressive Era: 1895–1928 ==
Population growth and decline
Year	1900	1910	1920	1930	1940	1950	1960	1970	1980	1990	2000	2007
Population	509,000	558,000	734,000	805,000	859,000	950,000	939,000	906,000	787,000	736,000	651,000	637,000

Political reform began in the mid-1890s with the defeat of the Arthur Gorman-Isaac Freeman Rasin Democratic machine.

=== Women's rights ===
Maryland was one of four US states to establish suffrage associations for women in 1867. In 1894, a second generation of Maryland suffrage organizations emerged. The Maryland Suffrage Association included leaders such as Etta Maddox and Emma Jane Funck. The association's activities included lobbying for suffrage at the state level and later lobbying for passage of the Nineteenth Amendment. Together with the Equal Suffrage League of Baltimore, they lobbied for women's right to vote at every session of the General Assembly until the Nineteenth Amendment was ratified in Maryland in 1941. Prior to ratification, early suffragists in Maryland helped advance women's rights in other ways. For example, Elizabeth King Ellicott, Martha Carey Thomas, Mary Garrett, Mary Gwinn, and Julia Rogers formed the Women's Fund Committee of the Johns Hopkins University and successfully negotiated that they would help raise money to build the new medical school on the condition that the school allows women to attend when it opened. In 1893, when the Johns Hopkins Medical School opened, there were three women and fifteen men in the first class.

=== The Great Baltimore Fire ===
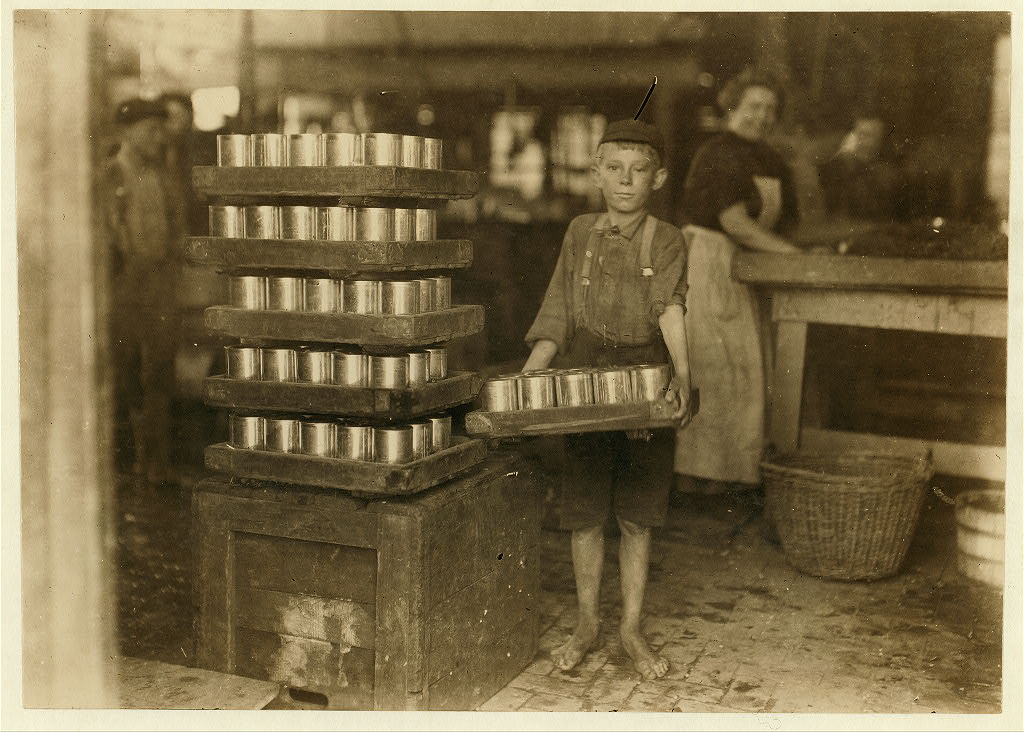
Child labor at J.S. Farrand Packing Company in Baltimore, 1909. Photo by Lewis Hine.

The Great Baltimore Fire of 1904 destroyed 70 blocks and 1,526 buildings in the downtown and led to systematic urban renewal programs. Baltimore was a poorly managed city in 1890, despite its economic vitality. Already Boston, Chicago, and New York were moving to modernize their public works infrastructures and to support the construction of capital-intensive, technologically sophisticated sewer and water supply systems. Baltimore lagged behind the other American metropolises because of its culture of privatism and the politicization of its municipal administration. However, during the 1890–1920 period the city responded to the same concerns as Chicago, New York, and Boston. The increase in urban crises, particularly the 1904 fire and the deterioration of sanitary conditions, prompted demands for reform. Moreover, the municipal administration underwent a process of moralization and professionalization in the 20th century. Afterward, Baltimore modeled itself on the other American metropolises and chose to modernize its institutions and address the industrial and urban challenges of the era.

=== Park planning ===
The story of the Patapsco Forest Reserve (later renamed the Patapsco Valley State Park) near Baltimore reveals notable connections between the Progressive-era movements for forest conservation and urban park planning. In 1903, the Patapsco Valley site, although outside the city boundary, was nevertheless identified by the Olmstead Brothers landscape architecture firm as an ideal site to acquire property for future park development. At the same time, the Maryland State Board of Forestry, seeking to establish scientific forestry research, received donated land for this purpose in the Patapsco Valley. Over subsequent decades, a powerful alliance of urban elites, state managers, and city officials assembled thousands of acres along the Patapsco River. The site evolved into a unique hybrid of forest preserve and public park that reflected both its location on the urban fringe and its dual heritage in the conservation and parks movements.

=== Baseball ===
When in 1918 the US government reversed its draft exemption for married workers and required all men to work in essential occupations or serve in the military, professional baseball players either enlisted or joined industrial baseball leagues. Company leagues included those of Bethlehem Steel, which had recreational leagues on both coasts that by 1918 represented a major-league level of competition. Sparrows Point, Maryland, a Bethlehem Steel company town, had a Steel League team, whose results Baltimore baseball fans followed closely. At the same time, fans also followed the draft status and 1918 season of Baltimore native Babe Ruth, then playing with the Boston Red Sox and considering his own options, including joining an industrial league team. In September Bethlehem Steel, fearing competition with other leagues over professional talent, disbanded the Steel League. When the war ended in November, players such as Ruth were free to re-sign with their major league teams.

=== Residential segregation ===
With the upswell of urbanization and industrialization, Baltimore experienced a boom in population, with its African American population growing from 54,000 to 79,000 between 1880 and 1900 and its total population more than doubling from 250,000 to 509,000 between 1870 and 1900. At the turn of the century, Baltimore citizens were also grappling with the escalation of disease and economic depression. African Americans moving from the South and rural areas with little money and limited job opportunities compromised living conditions by seeking cheaper housing and sharing apartments designed for single-families across multiple large families. This influx of residents into neighborhoods with poor sanitation and structural integrity began the formation of Baltimore's first slums.

Throughout the nineteenth century, Baltimore citizens had experienced no legislation segregating their housing. However, white residents became hostile towards black citizens moving from rural areas and the Baltimore slums into predominantly white neighborhoods, leading lawyer Milton Dashiell to draft an ordinance to segregate Baltimore. In 1911, Mayor J. Barry Mahool passed Dasheill's bill into law, cementing Baltimore as the first U.S. city to pass a residential segregation ordinance that constrained where African Americans could live. The law prohibited people of color from moving onto blocks where whites were the majority, and prevented white people from moving onto blocks where people of color were the majority. Many other cities across the United States soon followed suit, passing their own residential segregation laws. The supreme court struck down the 1917 Louisville, Kentucky ordinance, repealing Baltimore's segregation ordinance, but the legacy of the ordinance remained.

Although Baltimore had experienced an influx in its African American population around the turn of the century, the start of the First World War and the increased availability of urban industry jobs spurred the Great Migration, leading Baltimore like other Northern cities to experience a surge in its African American population, particularly around its ports. In response to the 1917 supreme court decision that abolished residential segregation and the influx of African American migrants, Mayor James H. Preston ordered housing inspectors to report anyone who rented or sold property to black people in predominantly white neighborhoods. This order entrenched the geographical divide by race in Baltimore, laying the redline foundations in the city. Twenty years later, Baltimore's housing projects were racially segregated into "white housing" and "Negro housing", further discriminating the distribution of Baltimore's resources.

== Depression and War: 1929–1949 ==
Argersinger (1988) describes the loss of power by traditional Democratic leaders and organizations in Baltimore under the New Deal. The old-line Democrats operated in the spirit of traditional political bosses who dispensed the patronage. They were, at best, lukewarm Roosevelt supporters because the New Deal threatened their monopoly on patronage. Blacks, other ethnic groups, labor, and other former supporters turned from their patrons to other leadership. Baltimore Mayor Howard W. Jackson's support gradually eroded until he was defeated in a gubernatorial primary election to choose an opponent for a Republican who earlier defeated Governor Albert C. Richie, a conservative Democrat.

=== World War II ===
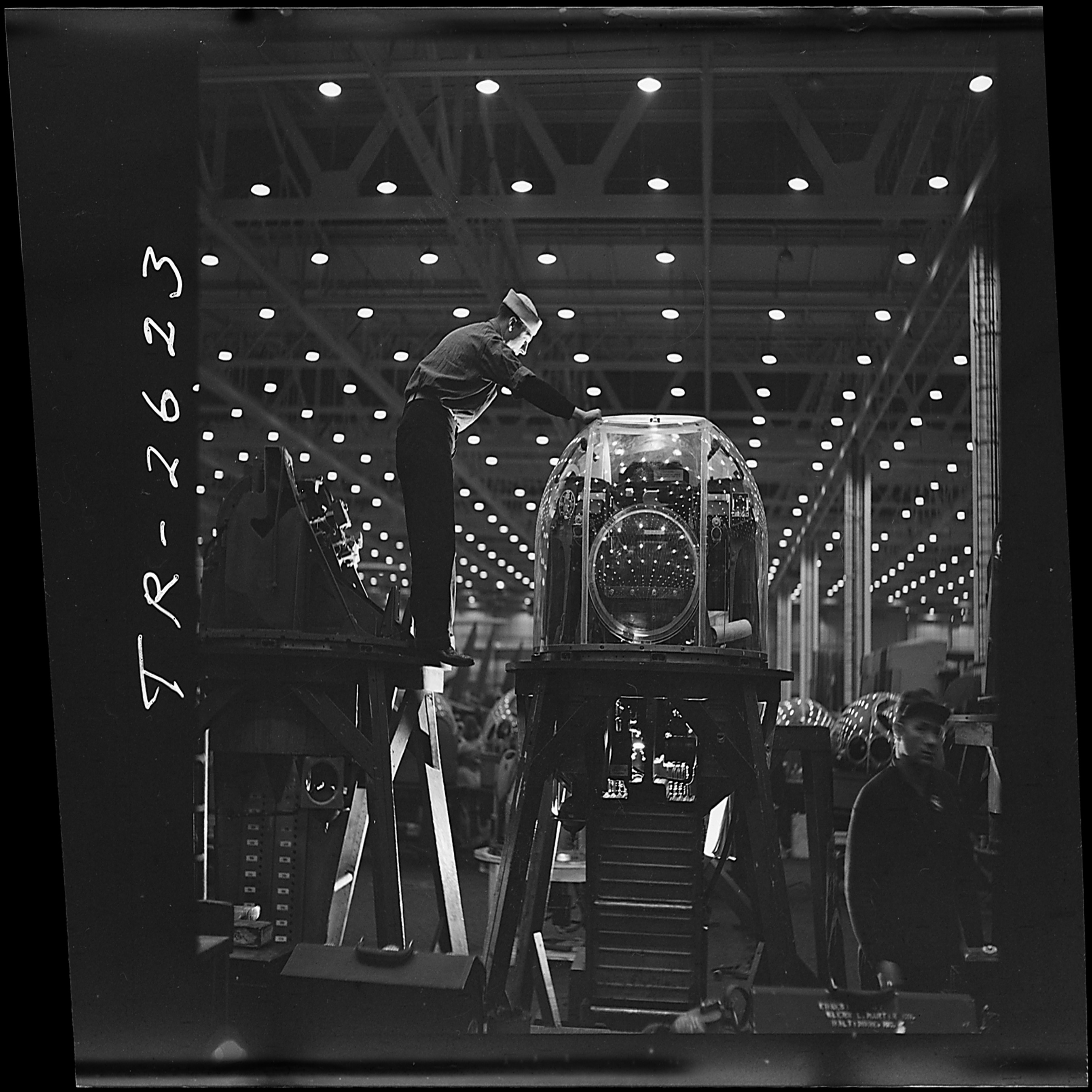
Worker assembling an aircraft at the Glenn L. Martin plant in Baltimore

Baltimore was a major war production center in World War II. The biggest operations were Bethlehem Steel's Fairfield Yard, on the southeastern edge of the harbor, which built Liberty ships; its workforce peaked at 46,700 in late 1943. Even larger was Glenn Martin, an aircraft plant located 10 miles (16 km) northeast of downtown. By late 1943 about 150,000 to 200,000 migrant war workers had arrived. They were predominantly poor white southerners; most came from the hills of Virginia, North Carolina, West Virginia, Pennsylvania, Kentucky, South Carolina, and Tennessee. War mobilization brought federal pressure to unionize the workforce, and by 1941 the leftist CIO had organized most of Baltimore's large industries, while the more conservative AFL also gained many new members. By 1945, labor unions and ethnics had taken over local politics and liberal mayors enjoyed black as well as white support. The machine was led by Italian Catholic politicians such as Nancy Pelosi's father, Thomas D'Alesandro, Jr., who was mayor in 1947–59; her brother, Thomas D'Alesandro III, was mayor from 1967 to 1971.

Father John F. Cronin's early confrontations with Communists in the World War II-era labor movement turned him into a leading anti-Communist in the Catholic Church and the US government during the Cold War. Father Cronin, then a prominent Catholic parish priest, saw a united labor movement as central to his moderate, reformist vision for Baltimore's social ills, and worked closely with anti-Communist labor leaders.

== Cold War era ==
In 1950, the city's population topped out at 950,000 people, of whom 24 percent were black. Then the white movement to the suburbs began in earnest, and the population inside the city limits steadily declined and became proportionately more black.

=== Schools ===
Integration of Baltimore's public schools at first went smoothly, as city elites suppressed working-class white complaints, as white families migrated to suburban school systems. By the 1970s new problems had surfaced. Formerly white schools had become mostly black schools, though whites still made up most of the faculty and administration. Worse, the school system had become dependent on federal funding. In 1974, these circumstances led to two dramatic incidents. A teachers' strike highlighted the city's unwillingness to raise teachers' salaries because a hike in property taxes would further alienate white residents. A second crisis revolved around a federally mandated desegregation plan that also threatened to alienate the remaining white residents.

=== Drugs ===
Heroin supply and use in Baltimore rose explosively in the 1960s, following a trend of rising drug use across the United States. In the late 1940s, there were only a few dozen African-American heroin addicts in the Pennsylvania Avenue area of the city. Heroin use began largely for reasons of prestige within a group that most middle-class blacks looked down on. When the Baltimore police formed the three-man narcotics squad in 1951 there was only moderate profit in drug dealing and shoplifting was the addict's crime of choice. By the late 1950s, young whites were using the drug, and by 1960 there were over one thousand heroin addicts in the police files; this figure doubled in the 1960s. A generation of profiteering young, violent black dealers took over in the 1960s as violence increased and the price of heroin skyrocketed. Increasing drug usage was the primary reason for burglaries rising tenfold and robberies rising thirtyfold from 1950 to 1970. Soaring numbers of broken homes and Baltimore's declining economic status probably exacerbated the drug problem. Adolescents in suburban areas began using drugs in the late 1960s.

=== Civil rights ===
In the 1930s and 1940s, the local chapter of the National Association for the Advancement of Colored People, the black churches, and the Afro-American weekly newspaper took charge of organizing and publicizing demonstrations. There was no rioting.

Read's Drug Store in Baltimore was the site of one of the nation's earliest sit-ins in January 1955. When a handful of black students sat at the store's lunch counter for less than half an hour, it precipitated a wave of desegregation.

In the late 1950s Martin Luther King Jr. and his national civil rights movement inspired black ministers in Baltimore to mobilize their communities in opposition to local discrimination. The churches were instrumental in keeping lines of communication open between the geographically and politically divided middle-class and poor blacks, a chasm that had widened since the end of World War II. Ministers formed a network across churches and denominations and did much of the face-to-face work of motivating people to organize and protest. In many cases they also adopted King's theology of justice and freedom and altered their preaching styles.

Civil rights activists also adopted more radical positions in the late 1960s. For example, Walter Lively, a socialist community activist, worked with and helped found several Black organizations devoted to racial and class equality and developed his own printing house and community museum.

=== 1968 unrest ===
Unrest in the black inner-city exploded for four nights in April 1968, after news arrived of the assassination of the Reverend Martin Luther King Jr. in Memphis Tennessee. Arson, looting, and attacks on police ended with six people dead, 700 injured, and 5,800 rioters arrested. About a thousand businesses were ransacked or burned, especially liquor stores, supermarkets, furniture stores, and taverns. Many shops never reopened, leaving the burned-out districts permanently under-served by retail stores. Governor Spiro T. Agnew sent in 5,000 National Guardsmen and imposed an 11 p.m. curfew. That was not enough, so President Lyndon Johnson, at the governor's request, sent in 6,000 U.S. Army combat troops to finally regain control of the city. The episode was a stimulus for an exodus to the suburbs and a political backlash by white voters. Agnew's statement that "evil men and not evil conditions" caused the riots resonated with white ethnic urban voters, and Republican Richard Nixon selected Agnew as his vice presidential running mate that summer.

=== Backlash ===
In the 1950s and 1960s, racial politics intensified in Baltimore, as in other cities. White Southerners came to Baltimore for factory jobs during World War II, permanently altering the city's political landscape. The new arrivals approved of the segregated system that had been in effect since the early 20th century. Working whites mobilized to prevent school integration after the Brown v. Board of Education decision of the Supreme Court in 1954. They believed that their interests were being sacrificed to those of black Americans. As working-class whites began to feel increasingly embattled in the face of federal intervention into local practices, many turned to the 1964 presidential primary campaign of George Wallace who swept the white working-class vote. Durr (2003) explains the defection of white working-class voters in Baltimore to the Republican Party as being caused by their fears that the Democratic Party's desegregation policies posed a threat to their families, workplaces, and neighborhoods.

Between 1950 and 1990, Baltimore's population declined by more than 200,000. The center of gravity has since shifted away from manufacturing and trade to service and knowledge industries, such as medicine and finance. Gentrification by well-educated newcomers has transformed the Harbor area into an upscale tourist destination.

== 21st century ==
In January 2004, the historic Hippodrome Theatre reopened after significant renovation as part of the France-Merrick Performing Arts Center. The Reginald F. Lewis Museum of Maryland African American History & Culture opened in 2005 on the northeast corner of President Street and East Pratt Street, and the National Slavic Museum in Fell's Point was established in 2012. On April 12, 2012, Johns Hopkins held a dedication ceremony to mark the completion of one of the United States' largest medical complexes – the Johns Hopkins Hospital in Baltimore – which features the Sheikh Zayed Cardiovascular and Critical Care Tower and The Charlotte R. Bloomberg Children's Center. The event, held at the entrance to the $1.1 billion 1.6 million-square-foot-facility, honored the many donors including Sheikh Khalifa bin Zayed Al Nahyan, first president of the United Arab Emirates, and Michael Bloomberg.

Maryland's Star-Spangled 200 celebration, launched as the "Star-Spangled Sailabration" and crescendo "Star-Spangled Spectacular" festivals, was a three-year commemoration of the 200th anniversary of the War of 1812 and the penning of The Star-Spangled Banner. The Star-Spangled Sailabration festival brought a total of 45 tall ships, naval vessels and others from the US, United Kingdom, Canada, Colombia, Brazil, Ecuador, and Mexico to Baltimore's Harbor. The event, held June 13–19, 2012, was the week encompassing Flag Day and the 200th anniversary of the Declaration of War. The Star-Spangled Spectacular was a 10-day free festival that celebrated the 200th anniversary of the United States National Anthem from September 6–16, 2014. More than 30 naval vessels and tall ships from the United States, United Kingdom, Canada, Norway, Germany, Spain, and Turkey berthed at the Inner Harbor, Fell's Point and North Locust Point. An air show from the Navy's Flight Demonstration Team, the Blue Angels performed during both festivals. Special guests such as President Barack Obama, Vice President Joe Biden, and Secretary of the Navy Ray Mabus, were in attendance at Fort McHenry National Monument and Historic Shrine. During the course of the Star-Spangled 200 celebration the city was showcased on three separate live television broadcasts. Visit Baltimore CEO, Tom Noonan, was quoted in the Baltimore Sun as calling the Spectacular, "the largest tourism event in our city's history." Over a million people visited Baltimore during both festivals.

=== 2015 protests ===
On April 19, 2015, West Baltimore resident Freddie Gray died after being in a coma for a week. Gray, who had a record of arrests for petty criminal activity, had been taken into custody after being racially profiled by police. Gray suffered spinal injuries while in police custody and fell into the coma. The cause of his injuries was disputed, with many finding they were the result of police brutality.

Protests were initially nonviolent, with thousands of peaceful protesters filled the City Hall square. Protests against police brutality turned violent following Gray's funeral on April 27, as people burned police cruisers and buildings and damaged shops. The Governor of Maryland, Larry Hogan sent in the National Guard and imposed a curfew. Six police officers were charged with crimes relating to Gray's death. One was acquitted, one trial ended in a hung jury, and four cases are ongoing as of June 12, 2016.

=== Port Covington development ===
On September 19, 2016, the Baltimore City Council approved a $660 million bond deal for the $5.5 billion Port Covington redevelopment project championed by Under Armour founder Kevin Plank and his real estate company Sagamore Development. Port Covington surpassed the Harbor Point development as the largest tax-increment financing deal in Baltimore's history and among the largest urban redevelopment projects in the country. The waterfront development that includes the new headquarters for Under Armour, as well as shops, housing, offices, and manufacturing spaces is projected to create 26,500 permanent jobs with a $4.3 billion annual economic impact. In an open letter Plank refers to the turbulent history in Baltimore's economic development and civic life as "forks in the road." He concludes by saying "we saw one of those great forks in the road, and chose the best course" with Port Covington. Mayor Stephanie Rawlings-Blake led the signing of three bills that commit the city to the sale of bonds over the next 15 to 20 years to fund the infrastructure for the Port Covington development on September 28, 2016.

=== Francis Scott Key Bridge collapse ===
On March 26, 2024 at 1:28 am, the Francis Scott Key Bridge that connects sections of the Baltimore Metropolitan Area was struck by a container ship bound for Singapore, causing the bridge to collapse and killing at least 6 people who were doing construction work on the bridge.

== Religious history ==
=== Roman Catholics ===
Francis Kenrick, the sixth Archbishop of Baltimore (1851–1863).

Baltimore has long been a major center of the Catholic Church. Important bishops include John Carroll (1735–1815, in-office 1789–1815), Francis Kenrick (1796–1863, in-office 1851–65), and especially Cardinal James Gibbons (1834—1921, in-office 1877–1921).

In 1806–21 Catholics constructed the Basilica of the National Shrine of the Assumption of the Blessed Virgin Mary, based on a neoclassical design by architect Benjamin Henry Latrobe. The church completed a $34 million restoration based on Latrobe's original plans in 2006.

During 1948–61, the Archdiocese of Baltimore was under the leadership of Francis Patrick Keough. The Baltimore Church identified with the anti-Communist and anti-pornography movements and with the expansion of Catholic institutions that addressed a myriad of social, economic, and educational issues. The Church also coordinated a multitude of action projects under the financial control of the Baltimore chancery.

=== Methodists ===
The Methodists were well received in Maryland in the 1760-1840 era, and Baltimore became an important center. Sutton (1998) looks at Methodist artisans and craftsmen, showing they embraced an evangelical identity, Protestant ethic, and complex organizational structure. This enabled them to express their anti-elitist or populist "producerist" values of self-discipline, honesty, frugality, and industry; they denounced greed and sought an interdependent common good. Such producerist views drew on aspects of the Wesleyan ethic, appropriated the commonweal traditions of 18th-century republicanism, and initially resisted those of classical liberal, individualistic, self-interested capitalism. They also accorded well with and helped produce the emerging amalgam of American populist, restorationist, biblicistic, revivalistic activism that Sutton terms "Arminianized Calvinism.

Inside the Methodist Church, the artisans were reformers who focused on three substantive and symbolic targets, each of which would democratize Methodist conferences: lay suffrage and representation; inclusion of the local preachers, who constituted two-thirds of Methodist leadership; and election of the officers who carried the administrative, personnel, and supervisory power, the presiding elders. The appeals made on behalf of these democratizations, Sutton shows, drew imaginatively on both producerist and Wesleyan rhetoric. By the 1850s, Sutton (1998) shows that the corporate ideals and individual disciplines of religious producerism were expressed in trade unionism, in evangelical missions to workers, in factory preaching, in workers' congregations, in temperance and Sabbatarianism, in the Sunday school movement, and in the politics of Protestant communal hegemony.

=== Baptists ===
The Appalachians and southern whites arriving in the 1940s brought along a strong religious tradition with them. Southern Baptist churches multiplied during the mid and late 1940s.

=== Evangelical Lutherans ===
The Zion Evangelical Lutheran congregation was founded in 1755 in order to serve the needs of Lutheran immigrants from Germany, as well as Germans from Pennsylvania who moved to Baltimore. It has a bi-lingual congregation that provides sermons in both German and English. In 1762 the congregation built its first church on Fish Street (now East Saratoga Street). It was replaced by a bigger building, the current Zion Church on North Gay Street and East Lexington Street erected from 1807 to 1808. An addition to the west along Lexington Street to Holliday Street of an "Aldersaal" (parish house), bell tower, parsonage, and enclosed garden in North German Hanseatic architecture under Pastor Julius K. Hoffman was made in 1912–1913.

=== Jews ===
Although the extent of Baltimore Jewry in the 18th century is not known, the existence of a Jewish cemetery in Baltimore can be traced back to 1786. The Jewish community grew significantly in the 19th century forming synagogues including Nidche Yisroel (now the Baltimore Hebrew Congregation; 1830), Har Sinai Congregation (1842), the Fell's Point Congregation (1848), and Temple Oheb Shalom (1853).

=== Muslims ===
Baltimore has had a Muslim community as far back as 1943. Masjid Ul-Haqq was established as a Nation of Islam mosque in 1947, on Ensor Street. The congregation later moved to 1000 Pennsylvania Avenue. The mosque was known as Mosque Six. The mosque moved to 514 Wilson Street in the late 1950s, where it is currently located. Nation of Islam leader Elijah Muhammad spoke at the mosque in 1960 to over a thousand people. After the death of Muhammad in 1975, the mosque's congregants converted to Sunni Islam and it became known as Masjid Ul-Haqq.

In 1979, the number of Muslims in Baltimore and its suburbs was estimated to be 3,000–5,000 by Islamic Society of Baltimore co-founder Dr. Mohamed Z. Awad.

As reported by The Baltimore Sun, in 1983, the number of Muslims in Baltimore was estimated to be several thousand. In 1985, the number was estimated the number to be around 15,000, as well as 40,000 Muslims living in the Baltimore–Washington region.

In 1995, Maqbool Patel, the president of the Islamic Society of Baltimore, estimated the number of active Muslim families in the state to be 5,000, with 1,500 being in the Baltimore area.

== See also ==
- Baltimore City Health Department#History for the history of public health.
- History of Native Americans in Baltimore
- History of African Americans in Baltimore
- History of the Germans in Baltimore
- History of slavery in MarylandComputer code
- Islam in Maryland
- Timeline of Baltimore
- List of mayors of Baltimore
- National Register of Historic Places listings in Baltimore, Maryland

== Bibliography ==
- Akerson, Louise A. (1988). American Indians in the Baltimore Area. Baltimore: Baltimore Center for Urban Archaeology. OCLC 18473413.
- Anderson, Alan D. (1977). The Origin and Resolution of an Urban Crisis: Baltimore, 1890–1930. Johns Hopkins studies in urban affairs. Baltimore: Johns Hopkins University Press. ISBN 9780801819704.
- Andrews, Dee E. (2002). The Methodists and Revolutionary America, 1760–1800: The Shaping of an Evangelical Culture. Princeton: Princeton University Press. ISBN 978-0691092980.
- Appleby, Joyce (2000). Inheriting the Revolution: The First Generation of Americans. Cambridge, Massachusetts: Belknap Press. ISBN 978-0-674-00236-4.
- Argersinger, Jo Ann E. (2011). Toward a New Deal in Baltimore: People and Government in the Great Depression. Chapel Hill: University of North Carolina Press. ISBN 0807857246.
- Bacon, Thomas (1765). Laws of Maryland At Large, with Proper Indexes. Vol. 75. Annapolis: Jonas Green.
- Browne, Gary Lawson (2012). Baltimore in the Nation, 1789–1861. Chapel Hill: University of North Carolina Press. ISBN 978-0807873144.
- Collier-Thomas, Bettye (1974). The Baltimore Black Community, 1865–1910. Washington, DC: George Washington University.
- Dilts, James D. (1996). The Great Road: The Building of the Baltimore and Ohio, the Nation's First Railroad, 1828–1853. Palo Alto, CA: Stanford University Press. ISBN 978-0-8047-2629-0.
- Durr, Kenneth D. (2003). Behind the Backlash: White Working-Class Politics in Baltimore, 1940–1980. Chapel Hill: University of North Carolina Press. ISBN 978-0807854334.
- Harwood, Herbert H. Jr. (1994). Impossible Challenge II: Baltimore to Washington and Harpers Ferry from 1828 to 1994. Baltimore: Barnard, Roberts. ISBN 0-934118-22-1.
- Krugler, John D (2004). English and Catholic: The Lords Baltimore in the Seventeenth Century. Baltimore: Johns Hopkins University Press. ISBN 0-8018-7963-9.
- Murphree, Daniel Scott (2012). Native America: A State-by-State Historical Encyclopedia. Santa Barbara, California: ABC-CLIO. ISBN 978-0-313-38126-3.
- Nix, Elizabeth; Elfenbein, Jessica; Hollowak, Thomas (2011). Baltimore '68: Riots and Rebirth in an American City. Philadelphia: Temple University Press. ISBN 978-1439906637.
- Olson, Sherry H. (1980). Baltimore: The Building of an American City. Baltimore: Johns Hopkins University Press. ISBN 978-0801856402.
- Phillips, Christopher (1997). Freedom's Port: The African American Community of Baltimore, 1791–1860. Urbana: University of Illinois Press. ISBN 978-0252066184.
- Potter, Stephen R. (1993). Commoners, Tribute, and Chiefs: The Development of Algonquian Culture in the Potomac Valley. Charlottesville, Virginia: University of Virginia Press. ISBN 0-8139-1422-1.
- Rice, Laura (2002). Maryland History In Prints 1743–1900. Baltimore: The Maryland Center for History and Culture. p. 77. ISBN 978-0938420712.
- Rizzo, Mary (2020). Come and Be Shocked: Baltimore Beyond John Waters and The Wire. Baltimore: Johns Hopkins University Press. ISBN 978-1421437910.
- Rosen, Christine Meisner (2003). "The Rebuilding of Baltimore". The Limits of Power: Great Fires and the Process of City Growth in America. Cambridge University Press. ISBN 9780521545709.
- Ryan, Mary P. (2019). Taking the Land to Make the City. Austin: University of Texas Press. ISBN 978-1-4773-1783-9.
- Schley, David (2020). Steam City: Railroads, Urban Space, and Corporate Capitalism in Nineteenth-Century Baltimore. Chicago: University of Chicago Press. ISBN 978-0226720258.
- Sharrer, G. Terry (1976). "Flour Milling in the Growth of Baltimore, 1750‒1830". Maryland Historical Magazine. 71 (3): 322‒333.
- Spalding, Thomas W. (1989). The Premier See: A History of the Archdiocese of Baltimore, 1789–1989. Baltimore: Johns Hopkins University Press. ISBN 978-0801852152.
- Sutton, William R. (1998). Journeymen for Jesus: Evangelical Artisans Confront Capitalism in Jacksonian Baltimore. Penn State Press. ISBN 9780271044125.
- Thomas, Isaiah (1874). The History of Printing in America, with a Biography of Printers, and an Account of Newspapers. Albany, N.Y.: J. Munsell.
- White, John H. Jr. (1980). A history of the American locomotive: its development, 1830–1880. Mineola, NY: Courier Dover Publications. ISBN 978-0-486-23818-0.
- Wroth, Lawrence C. (1922). A History of Printing in Colonial Maryland, 1686–1776. Baltimore: Typothetae of Baltimore.
- Wroth, Lawrence C. (1938). The Colonial Printer. Portland, ME: The Southworth-Anthoesen Press.
