= Masjid Muhammad =

Mosque in Washington, D.C.

Religion
- Affiliation: Islam
- Branch/tradition: Sunni

Location
- Location: 1519 4th St NW, Washington, D.C., 20008; United States
- Interactive map of Masjid Muhammad
- Coordinates: 38°54′37″N 77°00′57″W

Architecture
- Type: Mosque

Website
- thenationsmosque.org

Masjid Muhammad is an historically African-American mosque in Washington, D.C. Founded in 1960 as Nation of Islam Temple 4, the mosque is now affiliated with Sunni Islam. It is the second oldest mosque in Washington, D.C. and the city's oldest mosque founded by African-American descendants of enslaved people. Masjid Muhammad is commonly referred to as "The Nation's Mosque".

== History ==
Masjid Muhammad was founded in 1960 as Nation of Islam Temple 4 with the help of Malcolm X. Since The 1980s, it has been named Masjid Muhammad and has been affiliated with mainstream Sunni Islam.

In August 2023, the mosque received a bomb threat. The mosque was searched by the Metropolitan Police Department and later reopened. The incident was classified as a "felony offense hate crime" by the police.

== See also ==
- Islam in Washington, D.C.
- Nation of Islam
