= Islamic Society of Western Maryland =

Mosque in Hagerstown, Maryland, US

Religion
- Affiliation: Islam

Location
- Location: 2036 Day Road, Hagerstown, MD
- Interactive map of Islamic Society of Western Maryland
- Coordinates: 39°36′19.68″N 77°41′1.71″W

Architecture
- Type: mosque
- Style: Islamic
- Completed: 1994
- Minaret: One

Website
- iswmd.org

The Islamic Society of Western Maryland (ISWMD), located in Hagerstown, Maryland, is a mosque which was the first permanent structure to be built specifically to serve as a mosque in Western Maryland. The mosque was built in 1994, after the American Revolutionary War-era home proved to be insufficient to accommodate the growing community.

The society ran a day-care for five years but canceled it in 2003 due to concerns after a threat made to the day-care. Currently, the mosque operates a Sunday School program for children five years old and up. Construction to expand the mosque took place in 2014 and the masjid saw growth since the expansion. There are weekly events, charity events, as well as a food bank in the mosque.

== See also ==
- Islam in Maryland
