= Islam in Washington, D.C. =

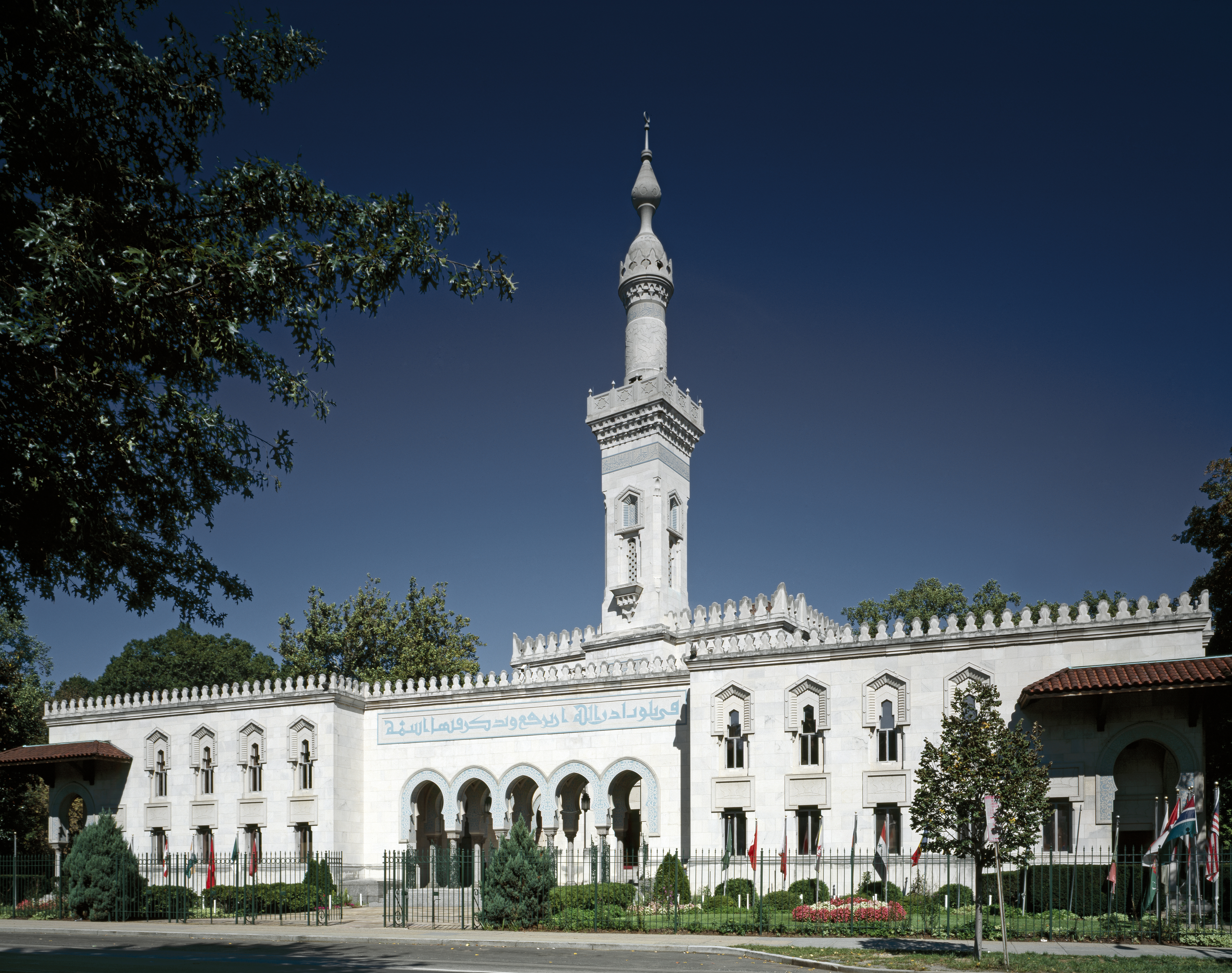
Islamic Center of Washington, 2016.

Islam in Washington, D.C. is the third largest religion, after Christianity and Judaism. As of 2023, Muslims were 3% of Greater Washington's population. Around 20,000 Muslims live in DC. DC's Muslim history dates to the early 1600s, when the first Muslim residents were enslaved and free African Americans. DC is home to seven mosques, including some of the oldest mosques in the United States. A copy of the Quran owned by Thomas Jefferson is held at the Library of Congress.

== History ==
Yarrow Mamout, a formerly enslaved Fulani Muslim property owner and entrepreneur, is one of the earliest known Muslim residents in DC history.

The Islamic Center of Washington, founded in 1952, is the oldest mosque in DC. At its dedication ceremony, President Dwight Eisenhower described it as among the "most beautiful buildings in Washington". The second oldest mosque in DC is the Masjid Muhammad, which began in 1960 as Nation of Islam Temple 4 and was founded with help from Malcolm X. Since 1975, the mosque has been affiliated with mainstream Sunni Islam. Masjid Muhammad is the oldest mosque in DC founded by African American descendants of slaves.

In 2006, Keith Ellison became the first Muslim elected to the United States Congress. He was sworn in on a copy of Thomas Jefferson's Quran, which caused controversy among right-wing pundits.

In a 2010 survey of religious congregations in Washington, D.C., the Association of Statisticians of American Religious Bodies found that 0.6% of congregants belonged to a Muslim congregation.

Some members of DC's Muslim community identify as LGBT. Daayiee Abdullah, an imam based in DC, is one of the few openly LGBT imams in the world. Imam Abdullah worked for many years to create a LGBT-inclusive mosque in DC. In 2011, Imam Abdullah created Masjid Nur Al-Isslaah (Light of Reform Mosque), which was held at a library in DC. He also runs the Mecca Institute, an online progressive Muslim organization.

== Mosques ==
- Fazl Mosque
- Islamic Center of Washington, Embassy Row
- Masjid Muhammad, Truxton Circle

== See also ==
- History of the Jews in Washington, D.C.
- Islam in Maryland
- White House Iftar dinner
