= Islam in Maryland =

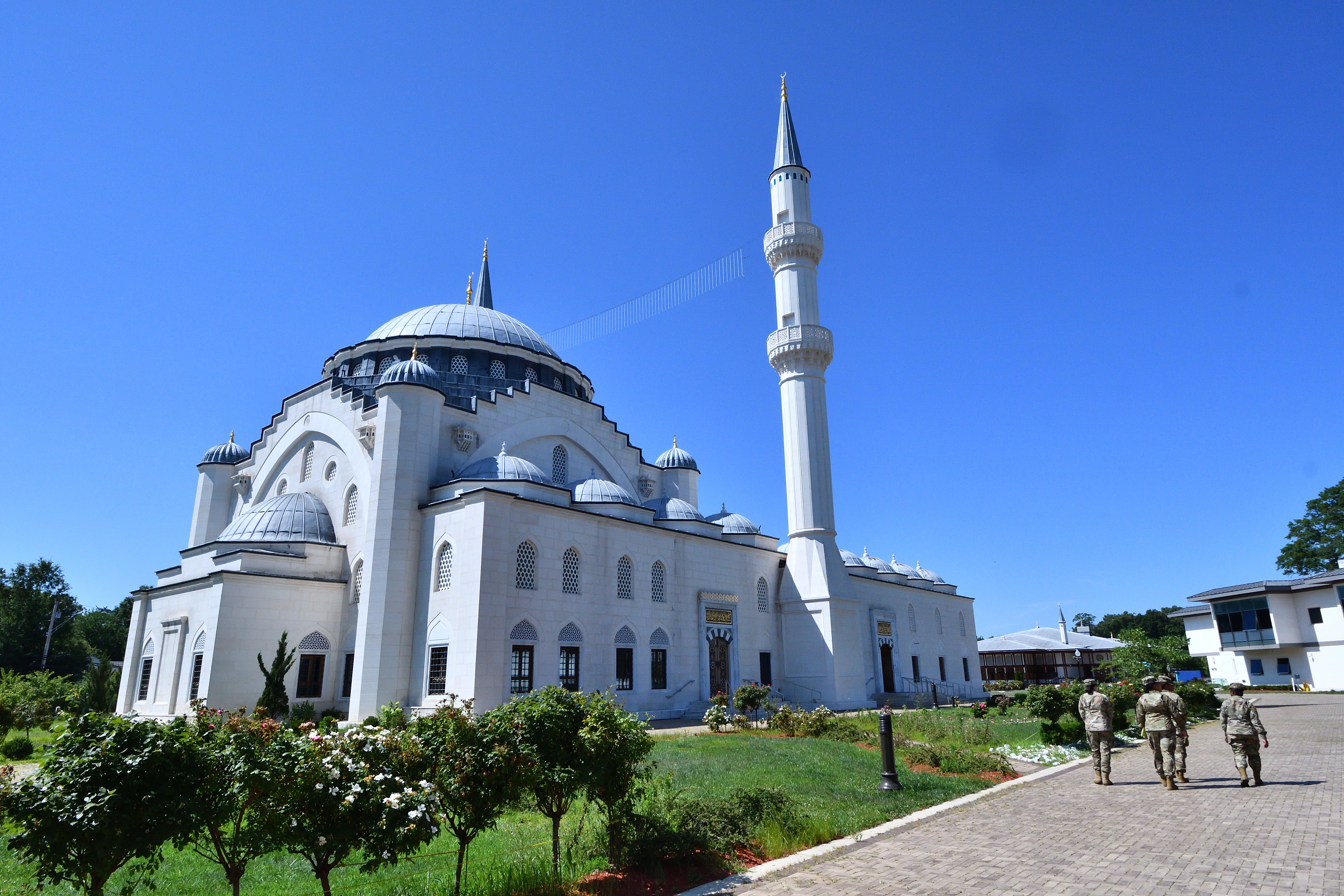
The Diyanet Center of America, a mosque and community center in Lanham, June 2017

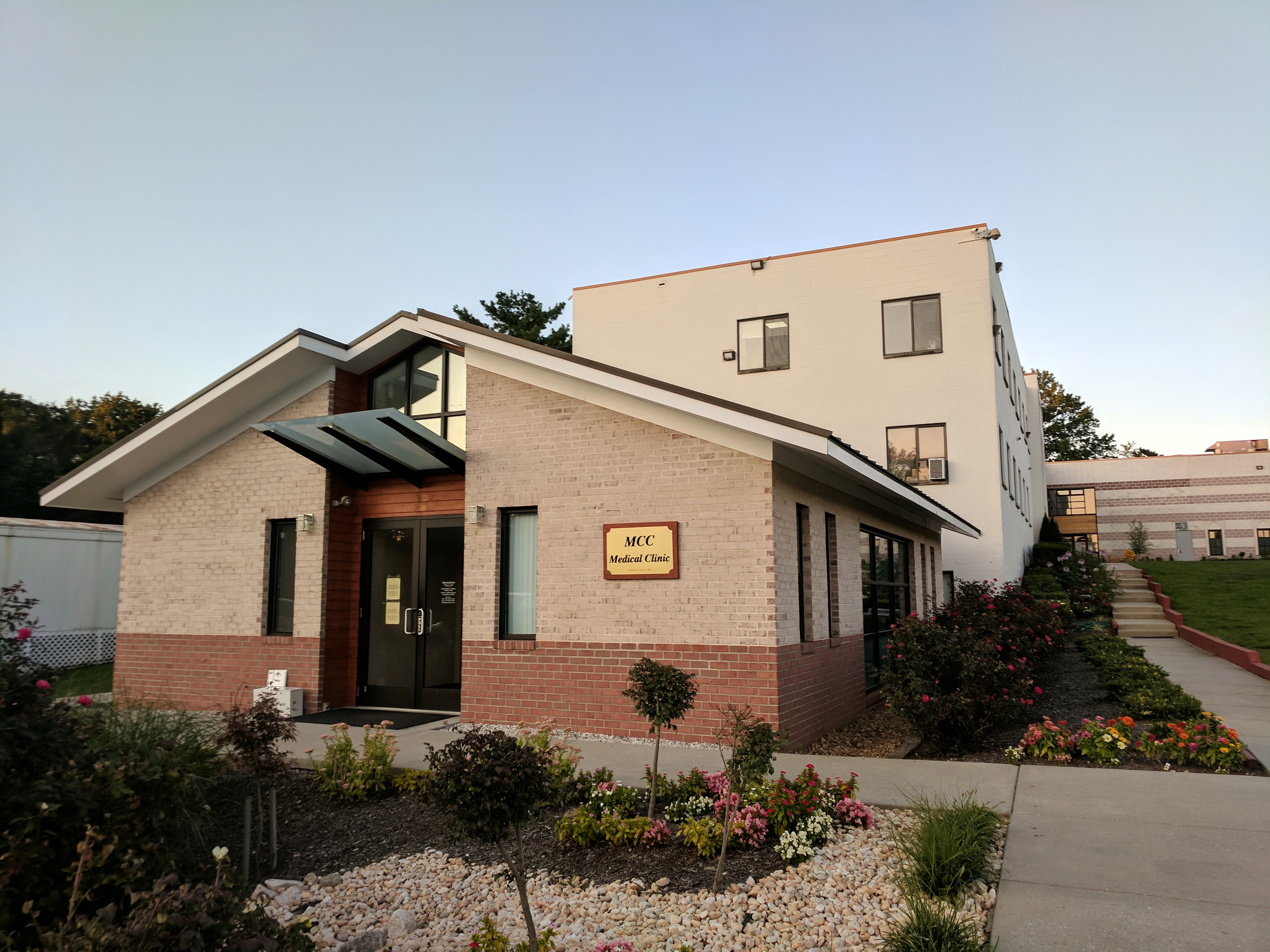
The Muslim Community Center Medical Clinic, a free clinic in Silver Spring, September 2017

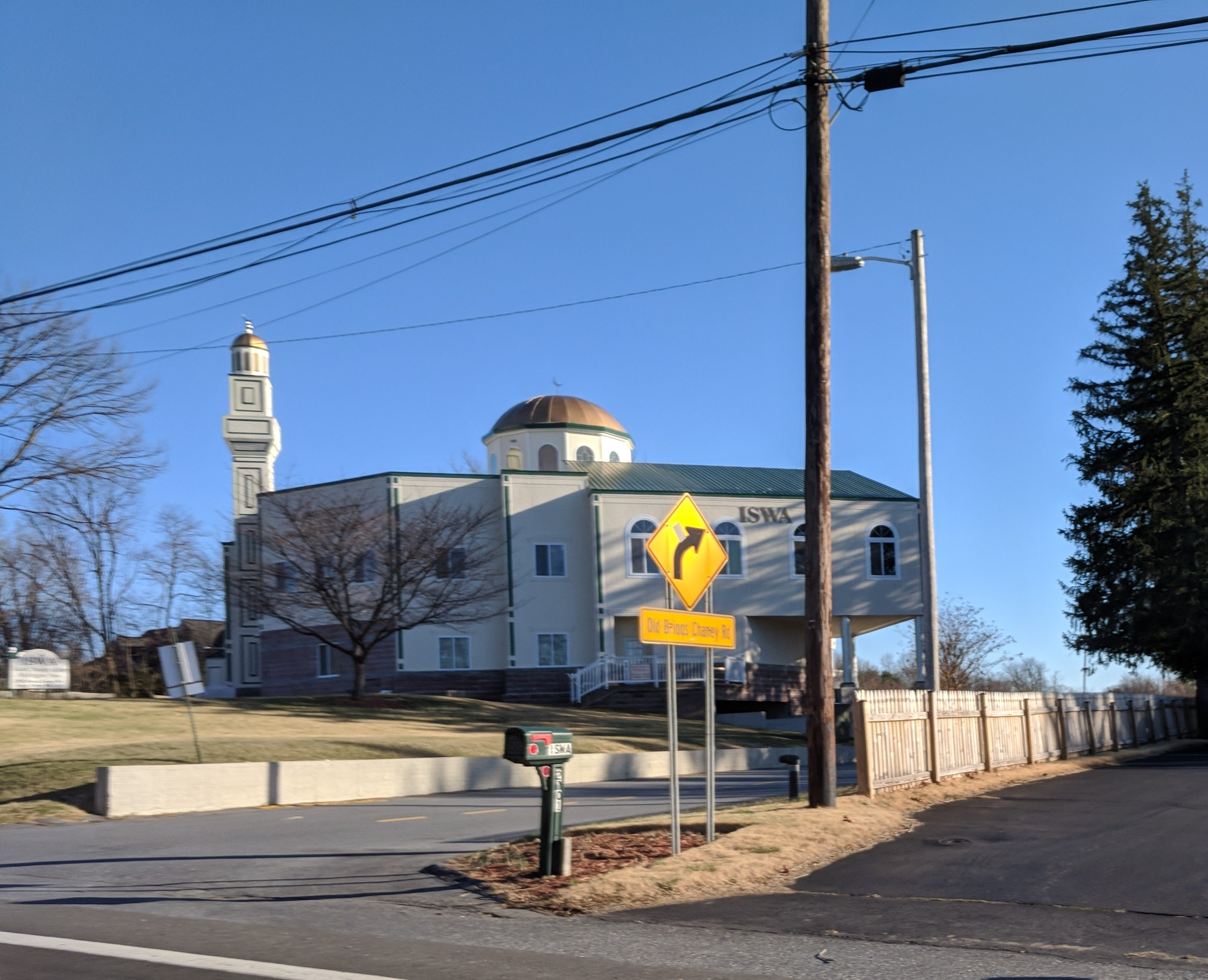
The Islamic Society of the Washington Area (ISWA) in Silver Spring, March 2018

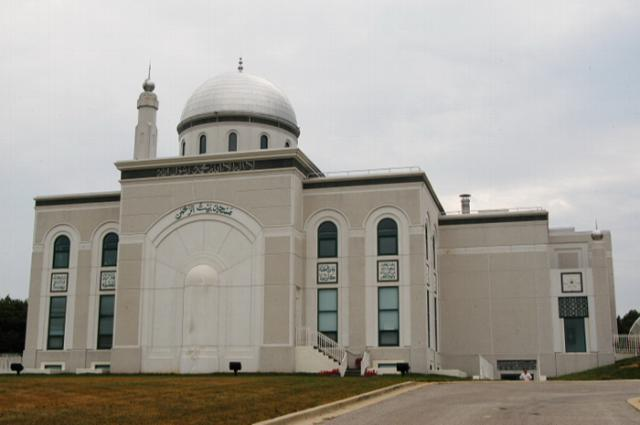
Baitur Rehman Mosque in Silver Spring, May 2012

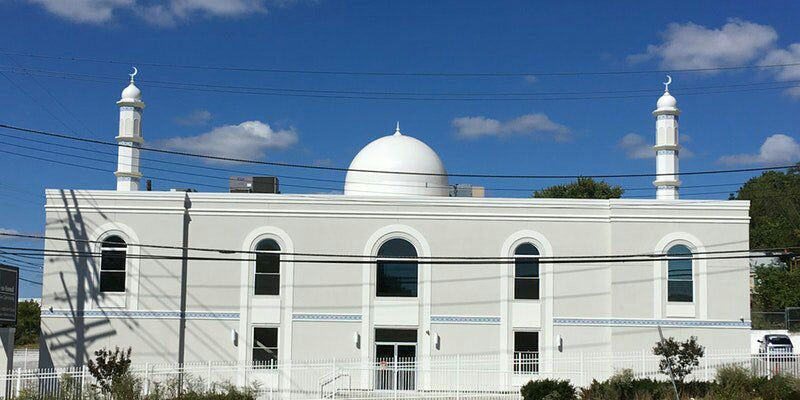
Masjid Bait-us-Samad in Rosedale, November 2018

There was around 70,000 Muslims in Maryland in the United States as of December 1992, according to the American Muslim Council. This is the tenth highest number of Muslims of all U.S. states, representing 1.4% of the Muslim population in the country, as well as 1.4% of the total population of Maryland, at the time of the report.

== History ==
=== Early Nation of Islam influence ===
In 1947, following the release of Nation of Islam leader Elijah Muhammad from prison, a Nation of Islam temple was established in Baltimore, on Ensor Street. The Nation of Islam, a Black-oriented form of Islam, separate from mainstream Islam, had been founded in Michigan in 1930. The temple grew quickly in the late 1940s and early 1950s, outgrowing its space and moving multiple times, before moving to its current location at 514 Wilson Street in the late 1950s. It was designated Temple No. 6. On June 26, 1960, Elijah Muhammad spoke to over a thousand people during a visit. The temple served 3,000 local members at the time.

=== Transition to Sunni Islam ===
Following the death of Elijah Muhammad in 1975, the Nation of Islam transitioned to Sunni Islam, and in accordance, the mosque was renamed to Masjid Muhammad, and renovations were made. The influence of the mosque resulted in Baltimore mayor Kurt Schmoke renaming Wilson Street to Islamic Way, and naming May 7 Islamic Community Day, in 1989. The mosque was later renamed to Masjid Al-Haqq, its current name, in 1994.

Another early mosque was Masjid As-Saffat, founded in Baltimore in 1971. It is home to the Islamic Community School, established in 1977 by a group of Muslim women to provide an Islamic education for their children. The Islamic Society of Baltimore, originating in 1969 as a weekly congregation at Johns Hopkins University, constructed a mosque in 1982, Masjid Al-Rahmah, and opened the Al-Rahmah School in 1987. The number of Muslims in Baltimore and its suburbs around this time was estimated to be 3,000–5,000, with higher estimates being up to 15,000, as well as 40,000 Muslims in the Baltimore–Washington region. A 2001 estimate placed the number of Muslims in Maryland at 50,000.

In 2000, the Islamic Society of Frederick planned the construction of a mosque along with a Muslim cemetery, which would be the first mosque in Frederick County and the first Muslim cemetery in Maryland. The land they wanted to build the mosque on, however, was off-limits for development, and their appeal to the county commissioners to connect to the county water and sewer lines, which saw over 200 Muslim families present, was met with a tie vote, barring their ability to build a mosque.

On March 5, 2016, the Gwynn Oak Islamic Community, consisting of around 60 families in the Howard Park–Gwynn Oak communities in Baltimore, opened Masjid Al Ihsan. The construction of the mosque was a six year endeavor due to city zoning rules and building regulations. It is the first mosque built from the ground-up in Baltimore.

On April 15–16, 2017, 20,000 Muslims attended the 42nd annual ICNA-MAS convention at the Baltimore Convention Center, which had been held in Baltimore since 2015. Many sessions addressed Islamophobia, such as "Combating Islamophobia", "Asserting Your Rights Under Trump Presidency", and "Working through Challenging Times".

== Mosques ==
- Al-Madina Masjid, a mosque in Woodlawn
- An Nur Foundation, a mosque in White Marsh
- Dar Al-Taqwa Islamic Center, a mosque in Ellicott City
- Diyanet Center of America, a mosque and community center in Lanham
- Gwynn Oak Islamic Community, a mosque in the Gwynn Oak neighborhood of Baltimore
- Idara-E-Jaferia, a Shia mosque and Islamic education center in Burtonsville
- Imam Mahdi Islamic Education Center of Baltimore, a mosque and Islamic education center in Baltimore
- Islamic Center of Maryland, a mosque in Gaithersburg
- Islamic Society of Baltimore, an Islamic center in Catonsville serving around 3,000 people, site of former president Barack Obama's first presidential visit to a U.S. mosque
- Islamic Society of the Washington Area, a mosque in Fairland
- Islamic Society of Western Maryland, a mosque in Hagerstown
- Masjid Fatima, a mosque in Catonsville
- Masjid Us Salaam, a mosque in downtown Baltimore
- Muslim Community Cultural Center of Baltimore, a mosque in Baltimore

== See also ==
- Al Huda School (Maryland)
- Islam in Washington, D.C.
- Minaret of Freedom Institute
