= Islamic Society of Baltimore =

Muslim mosque and religious community center in Baltimore County, Maryland

- Islamic Society of Baltimore, MD, Inc.

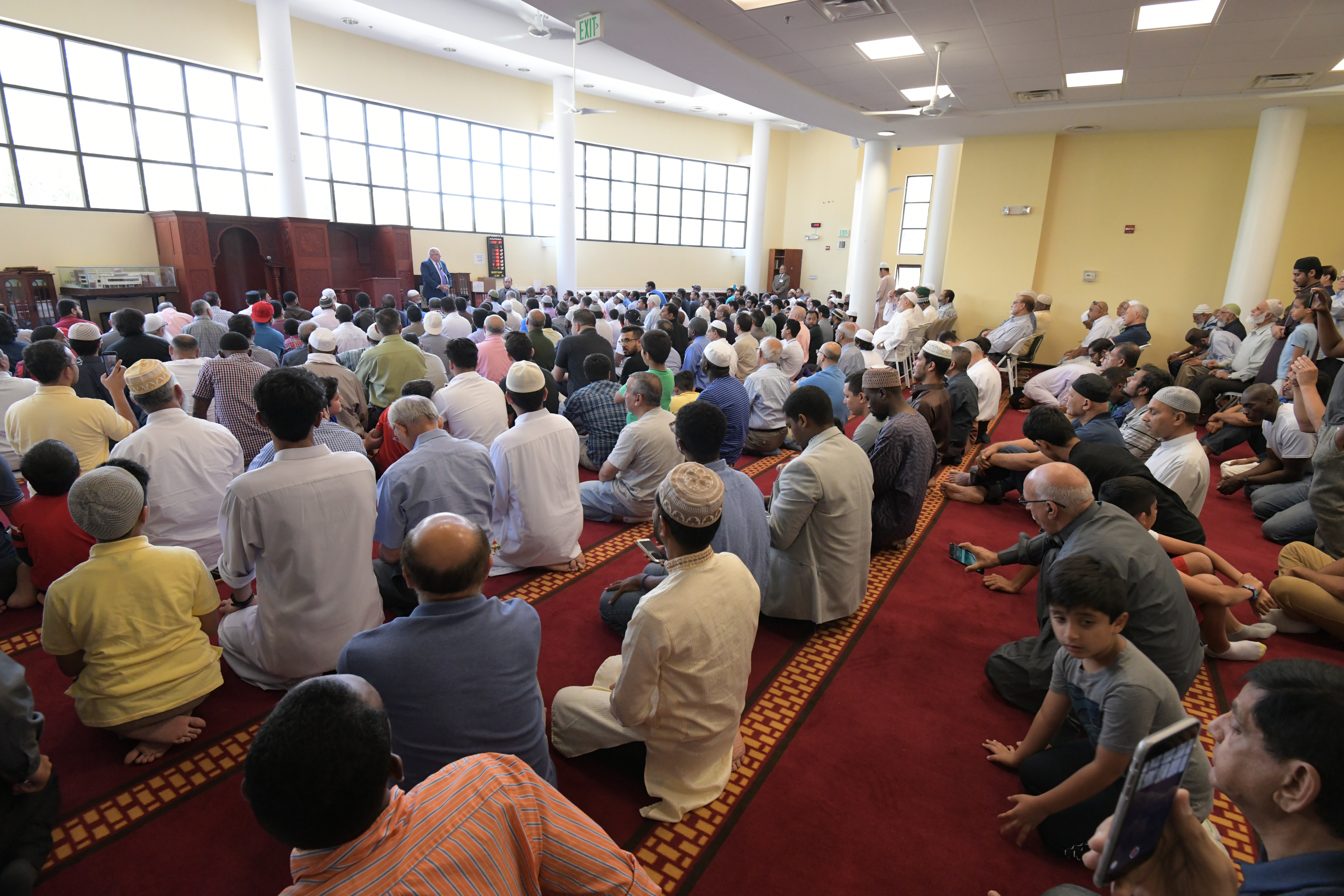
- Larry Hogan speaking at ISB in 2018
- Abbreviation: ISB
- Formation: September 2, 1969
- Founded at: Shaffer Hall, in the Homewood Campus of Johns Hopkins University
- Legal status: Active
- Purpose: Serves Muslims of the Baltimore area
- Location: 6631 Johnnycake Rd, Catonsville, Maryland 21228
- Coordinates: 39°18′13″N 76°44′53″W
- Services: Al-Rahmah School, Al-Rahmah Nursery, Al-Rahmah Quran Academy, Health Clinic
- President: Hasan Hammad
- Board of directors: Council Member(s): Edmund Tori (president); Faizan Mahmoodi (vice president); Aijaz Hasan (treasurer); Umar Saleem (secretary); Najla Abdur-Rahman (secretary); Shaista Mohammad (secretary); Rehan Alavi (secretary); Abdullah Shafi (secretary); Sharif Silmi (secretary)
- Website: isb.org

The Islamic Society of Baltimore (ISB) is a Muslim community center located in Catonsville, Baltimore County, Maryland, consisting of Masjid Al-Rahmah, Al-Rahmah School, and several other services. The society was founded in 1969 by three Muslim physicians and is known for then-President Barack Obama's visit on February 3, 2016. As of 2019, the society serves around 3,000 people.

== History ==
The Islamic Society of Baltimore was founded in 1969 by three Muslim physicians, one of whom was Mohamed Z. Awad, an Egyptian-born physician at Towson, Maryland. Awad co-founded the society due to Muslims' concerns to "maintain their religion for themselves and to pass on their Islamic heritage to their children in the face of strong pressures toward assimilation." Several Baltimore mosques may have helped in the founding of the Islamic Society of Baltimore, including Masjid Al-Haqq and Masjid As-Saffat, founded in 1947 and 1971, respectively, in which early members of the society attended. The society began with several families who met every Sunday at Shaffer Hall in the Homewood Campus of Johns Hopkins University to pray, discuss scriptures, and study Arabic. The organization was registered in the state of Maryland on September 2, 1969.

Efforts to raise funds for the construction of a mosque were made by the society as early as 1970, in the form of a fundraising bazaar. Bazaars to raise funds were also held in the years 1971 and 1972 on the campus of Johns Hopkins University. The society consisted mostly of foreign-born Muslims from India, Pakistan, and Middle Eastern countries. By the end of the 1970s, the society served around one hundred families of diverse.

On March 7, 1982, 52-year-old Sunday school teacher and director of education Muhammad Aslam was shot and killed in his hometown of Philadelphia, from which he would regularly travel from to the Society. A caller, apparently eager to learn about Islam, and aware of his schedule, had offered to drive him. He was found killed by Interstate 95 within hours of leaving home. Many in Islamic cirles speculated a religious motive or disagreements with his teachings—no perpetrator was discovered. He was buried in Pakistan.

The society purchased a lot on Johnnycake Road by the late 1970s, where Masjid Al-Rahmah was constructed from 1982–83. The mosque was built with a capacity of around 180 people, but held around 300 people during Friday prayers. In 1985, the society's mostly foreign-born membership had around 475 families. In 1987, a gymnasium was built, and a full-time K–12 school, Al-Rahmah School, was established with 27 students in its first year. The campus also includes a housing complex. The Al-Rahmah Quran Academy was opened in 1999–2000 by Qari Muhammad Zahid, initially having one student.

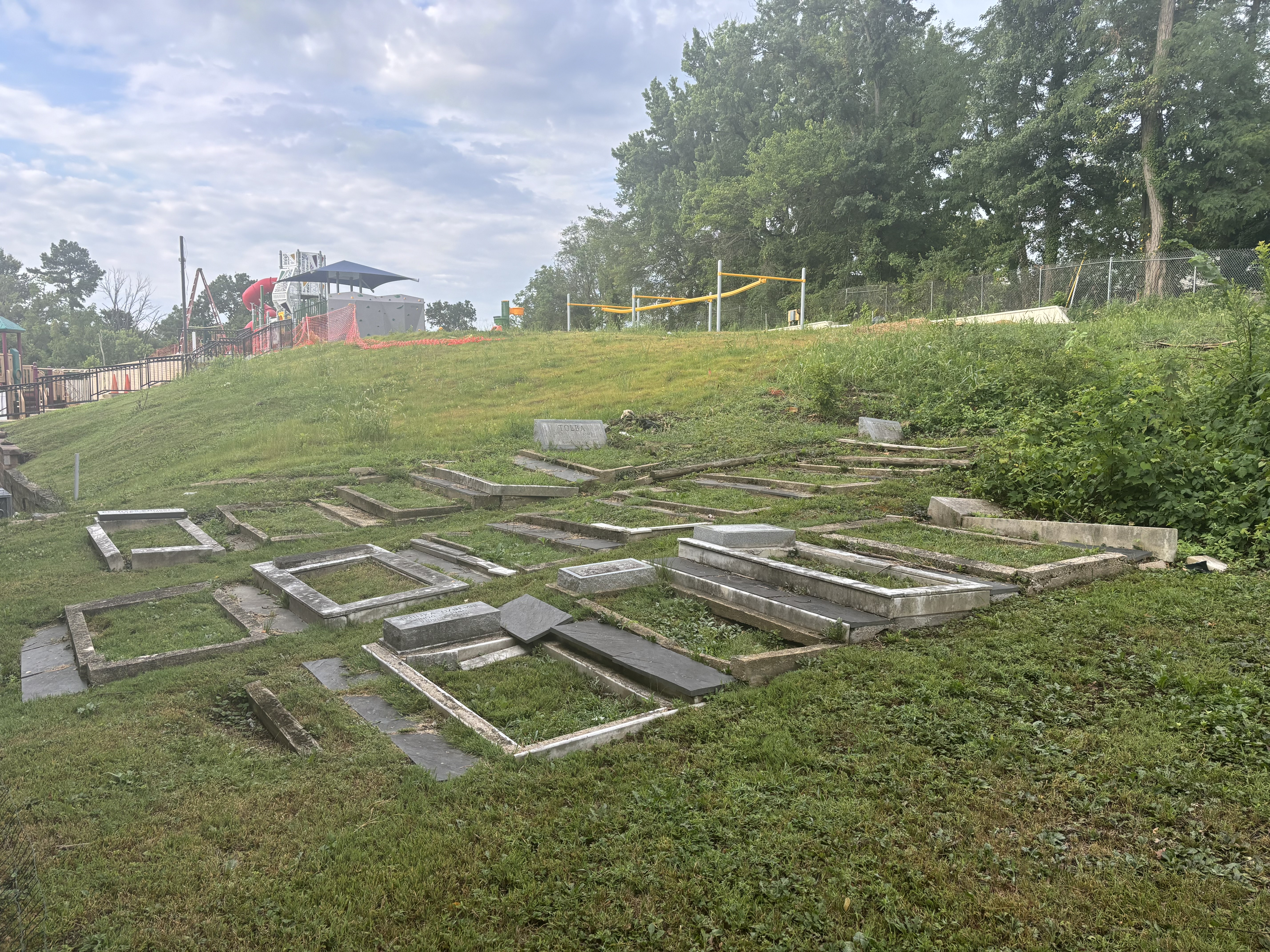
The old cemetery used by the mosque during the 1980s

Following the September 11 attacks in 2001 by the Islamist militant group Al-Qaeda, the leaders of nine Baltimore area mosques gathered at the mosque to discuss the events and how to help victims of the attacks. Police stationed officers to keep watch over the mosque at all hours. An open house was held at the society for the public on September 23, which was attended by Baltimore mayor and future Maryland governor Martin O'Malley. In the weeks following the attacks, no incidents of discrimination or harassment were reported at the mosque, although general secretary Abid Husain claimed that a woman had screamed profanities at the mosque shortly after the attacks occurred.

In 2003, El-Sheikh, who had been an imam at the mosque from 1983–1989 and 1994–2003, left the mosque.

In April and May 2015, the society received two threats from anonymous callers. The first call occurred on April 28 to the school facility, in which the caller asked the time at which the school closes, before reportedly saying, "It's the perfect time to bomb the bus." The second call occurred on May 5, in which the caller threatened to "spill Muslim blood." The Baltimore County Police Department does not believe either of the two threats are credible, although they improved security on the society's campus in response to it.

=== Barack Obama's visit ===
External videos
- The President Speaks at the Islamic Society of Baltimore

On December 14, 2015, the White House held three meetings with Muslim leaders to discuss concerns about rising hostility toward religious minorities. They pressed officials to consider then-president Barack Obama to visit a mosque, preferably with former president George W. Bush, which has been requested for years.

On January 28, 2016, mosque officials were informed of a possible visit by Barack Obama, and plans for the visit to the mosque were made official and announced by the White House on January 30. A White House official stated that its purpose is "to celebrate the contributions Muslim Americans make to our nation and reaffirm the importance of religious freedom to our way of life".

Barack Obama visited the mosque on February 3, 2016, marking his first presidential visit to a mosque in the United States. He held a round table discussion with Muslim community leaders and made a speech, in which he rejected political rhetoric and violence directed at Muslims, and talked about the role Islam has played in American history.

=== 2018–2020 expansion ===
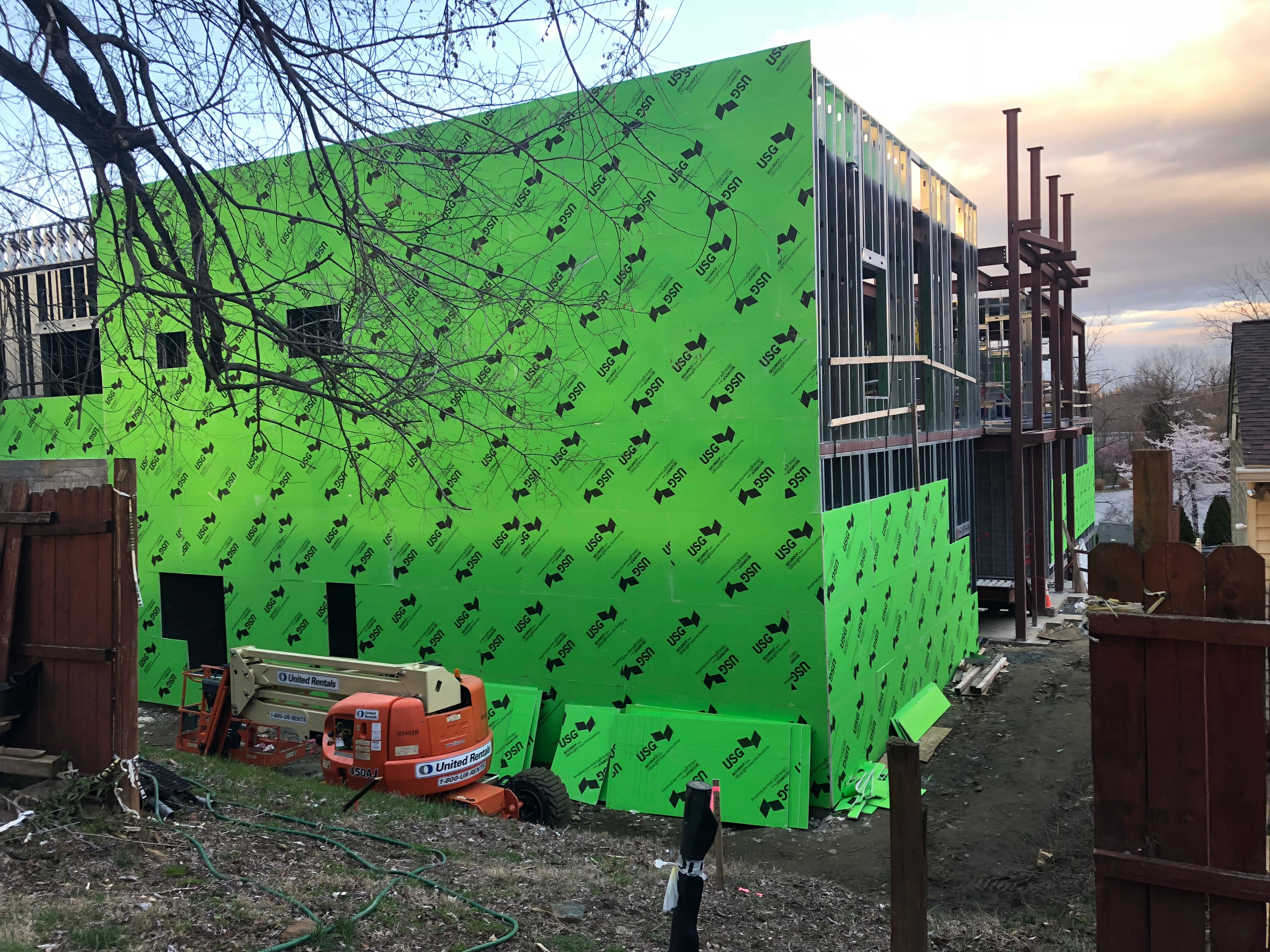
Construction in March 2020

County officials issued a mandate to remove the temporary classroom trailers, as there are too many on the campus. Around ten Al-Rahmah School classes were being held in the trailers due to lack of space in the main building. The society developed plans for expansion from older proposed expansion layouts, and having been given permission by the county, a groundbreaking ceremony was held in October 2018. The expansion planned to add a library, more classrooms, larger prayer areas for major events, and move the Al-Rahmah Quran Academy closer to the main building. The cost was estimated to be around $2 million and was projected to be completed by August 2019, coinciding with the society's 50th anniversary. The 50 Strong campaign celebrated both the society's 50th anniversary in 2019 and the expansion project. The society collected artifacts such as old photos and documents from its past, which was to be presented in a multimedia project on the society's anniversary.

In response to the COVID-19 pandemic, the Islamic Society of Baltimore cancelled all prayers and events, broadcasting programs and religious activities from its YouTube channel to reach people. Mosque officials formed an all-physician task force to recommend safety protocols. During Ramadan, the society distributed "Blessing Boxes", boxes containing flour, oil, rice, and other household staples, to help Muslim families affected by COVID-19 break their fast. A drive-through was also set up for families to receive meals while socially distancing. Alongside 49 other local organizations, the Islamic Society of Baltimore received a grant of at least $3,000 from the Baltimore County COVID-19 Emergency Response Fund to promote public health.

== Controversies ==
In 2016, fringe media outlets accused the organization of having ties to extremism, right after the announcement of Barack Obama's visit to the mosque. This included many right-wing conservative news outlets such as Fox News, The Washington Times, The Daily Caller and particularly the Alt-right think tank, Breitbart News. The criticisms of the conservative media revolved around Mohammed Adam El-Sheikh, a former imam at the mosque, who was a member of the Muslim Brotherhood before cutting ties in 1992. Zuhdi Jasser, an American Muslim doctor and activist who regularly appears on Fox News and other conservative outlets, stated that "as a Muslim American I'm just insulted...This mosque is very concerning", due to past affiliation of the Adam El-Sheikh with the Muslim Brotherhood during an interview with Fox & Friends. Jasser described the mosque as radical, extreme, and not representative of modern Muslim Americans.

Those who opposed have argued that these “controversies” are tenuous at best, and effectively increase broader anti-Muslim sentiment within the United States.

=== Mohammed Adam El-Sheikh ===
While Mohammed Adam El-Sheikh was an imam at the mosque in 2004, he told The Washington Post, "If certain Muslims are to be cornered where they cannot defend themselves, except through these kinds of means, and their local religious leaders issued fatwas to permit that, then it becomes acceptable as an exceptional rule, but should not be taken as a principle." Coinciding with Obama's visit in 2016, this comment gained controversy among several right-wing media such as The Daily Caller, Fox News, and The Washington Times. ThinkProgress, however, commented that these "right-wing outlets omitted that fact that the quote was a specific reference to the uptick in violence between Israelis and Palestinians — not Americans — and that Sheikh immediately added that 'condemnation of indiscriminate killing of civilians' was widespread in his community."

El-Sheikh was a member of the Muslim Brotherhood in Sudan before moving to the United States in 1978. However, as he told The Washington Post, he cut relations with the group in 1992. "We should cut relations with the [Brotherhood] abroad and regard ourselves as Americans... We don't receive an order from any organization abroad, and [they] have no authority to tell us what to do," Sheikh said to the Washington Post.

El-Sheikh was also a co-founder of the Muslim American Society, a group that used to be controlled by the Muslim Brotherhood. El-Sheikh was also a regional director for the Islamic American Relief Agency, whose parent organization has been cited by the U.S. Treasury Department for connections to Al-Qaeda and the Taliban.

=== Other controversies ===
In 2011, Suleiman Anwar Bengharsa, a Muslim cleric, prison chaplain, and imam, was a volunteer guest speaker at the Islamic Society of Baltimore. Mosque officials reported that this individual was unknown to the community, noting that the mosque serves up to 40,000 Baltimore-Washington area Muslims,

Five years later, Bengharsa condemned [all] American mosques as un-Islamic. According to an FBI affidavit filed in federal court, in June 2015, he supplied $1,300 to Sebastian Gregerson in Detroit, who used it to expand his arsenal of firearms and grenades, although Bengharsa claimed it was intended for charity. Gregerson was arrested in July and indicted on explosive charges. The FBI suspected the two men of plotting terrorism.

== See also ==
- Islam in Maryland
- List of mosques in the United States
