= Mencken (surname) =

Mencken is a surname of German origin. Notable people with the surname include:

- August Mencken Jr. (1889–1967), American civil engineer and author
- August Mencken Sr. (1854–1899), American cigar maker
- H. L. Mencken (1880–1956), American writer

== See also ==
- Menken
