= August Mencken =

August Mencken may refer to:

- August Mencken Jr. (1889–1967), American civil engineer and author
- August Mencken Sr. (1854–1899), his father, American cigar magnate
