= Marion Bloom =

American nurse (1891–1975)

- Born: 1891; New Windsor, Maryland, U.S.
- Died: March 10, 1975 (aged 83–84)
- Occupations: Writer; nurse
- Known for: Relationship with H. L. Mencken

Marion L. Bloom (1891 – March 10, 1975) was an American writer and nurse, and briefly a literary agent, known for her nearly decade-long relationship with H. L. Mencken.

== Life ==
Bloom was born in New Windsor, Maryland. She was one of eight children, with five brothers and two sisters. When Bloom was seven, she lost her father to suicide, prompting her older siblings to seek employment to support the family. As a teenager, Bloom moved to Washington, D.C. to find work as a writer. In February 1914, she met H. L. Mencken in Washington, D.C. Shortly after this, the two became romantically involved. Mencken would travel to visit her in Washington, D.C., and Bloom visited him in New York City. Bloom worked as a nurse for six months in the United States Army in Europe during World War I. Upon returning to the United States, she converted to Christian Science. Mencken, an atheist, believed that Bloom's faith was a hindrance upon their marriage.

In 1923, Bloom briefly married Lou Maritza, a Romanian historian, which pushed Mencken to destroy her letters to him. Later, Bloom moved to France. By the time she returned to the United States, Mencken had married the terminally ill Sara Haardt in 1930, who died four years later.

According to Fred Hobson, Bloom was "an interesting character in her own right, a compelling figure not because she was special in any way, but because she was emblematic of the prototypical small-town girl, emerging from hardship, poverty and religious piety, who went to the city to pursue her own idea of the American Dream. Bloom was never fully able to determine what version of that dream she wanted most — whether to succeed as a new woman, self-reliant professionally and emotionally, or whether to play a more traditional role and become the wife of a powerful man such as H. L. Mencken. She could not easily, in her time, have both, and she ended up having neither."

Edward A. Martin's book, "In Defense of Marion," discusses the significance of the relationship between Bloom and Mencken, describing it as "the most important love relationship in H. L. Mencken’s life." Martin suggests that Mencken attempted to conceal this relationship, hoping it would remain hidden within the extensive documentation of his literary accomplishments as an author and editor. Martin observes that their relationship thrived during a time when Mencken frequently addressed women's issues in his writings.

Her association with H. L. Mencken commenced in February 1914, during her visit to the premises of the Baltimore Sun. Although Mencken and Bloom's relationship ended in the early 1920s, their exchange of love letters later shows Bloom's lasting admiration for Mencken. Their love letters were published in 1996 in "In Defense of Marion: The Love of Marion Bloom and H. L. Mencken."

Bloom authored several books and wrote for American Mercury and The Washington Herald. She also returned to the nursing field, working for the American Red Cross as assistant chief of the Resources Information unit. It is believed that she may have served in the army again as a nurse during and after World War II, from 1944 until 1947. She worked for the Junior Red Cross in the late 1940s and was employed by the State Department in 1950, retiring ten years later. She died on March 10, 1975.

The correspondences between Mencken, Bloom, and her sister Estelle are housed at the Enoch Pratt Free Library of Baltimore and the New York Public Library.
