= Menkin =

Menkin is a surname. Notable people with the surname include:

- Dani Menkin (born 1970), Los Angeles–based writer, director, and film producer
- David Menkin (born 1977), Norwegian actor
- Miriam Menkin (1901–1992), American scientist

== See also ==
- Menken
