= H. L. Mencken House =

Historic house in Maryland, United States

- U.S. National Register of Historic Places
- U.S. National Historic Landmark
- U.S. Historic district – Contributing property
- Baltimore City Landmark
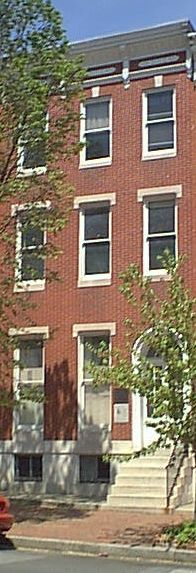
- Interactive map of H. L. Mencken House
- Location: 1524 Hollins St., Baltimore, Maryland
- Coordinates: 39°17′15.2″N 76°38′30.6″W
- Built: 1883; 143 years ago
- Architectural style: Italianate
- Website: menckenhouse.org
- NRHP reference No.: 83004384

Significant dates
- Added to NRHP: July 28, 1983
- Designated NHL: July 28, 1983
- Designated BCL: 1975

The H. L. Mencken House was the home of Baltimore Sun journalist and author Henry Louis Mencken, who lived here from 1883 until his death in 1956. The Italianate brick row house at 1524 Hollins Street in Baltimore was designated a Baltimore City Landmark in 1975, and as an individual National Historic Landmark on the National Register of Historic Places in 1983. Mencken wrote of his home: "I have lived in one house in Baltimore for nearly 45 years. It has changed in that time, as I have—but somehow it still remains the same ... It is as much a part of me as my two hands. If I had to leave it I'd be as certainly crippled as if I lost a leg."

After his death on January 26, 1956, Mencken's Brother, August, continued to live in the house until his death on May 19, 1967, when it was bequeathed to the University of Maryland and used for offices and student housing.

In 1983 the City of Baltimore, under Mayor William Donald Schaefer, acquired the H. L. Mencken House from the university and opened it as a museum. With period furniture, the H. L. Mencken House was part of the now defunct City Life Museums and a center for literary and other cultural events.

In 1997 after the demise of the City Life Museums, The Friends of the H.L. Mencken House and the Society to Preserve H.L. Mencken's Legacy, Inc. led the efforts of multiple groups to restore and re-open the house and operate it as a museum. It was not until 2006, when a $3 million bequest from Navy Commander and Mencken fan Max Edwin Hency was received that a complete restoration became possible. Restoration work was begun in 2018 and the museum opened the following year. The museum is open to visitors by appointment.

== Description ==
The Mencken House is a three-story brick row house in Baltimore's Union Square neighborhood. The property extends between Hollins Street at the front to Booth Street to the rear. The house fronts on Union Square. It is one of several nearly identical houses on the north side of the park, sharing Italianate detailing with its neighbors. The house and its interiors have remained faithful to its period of historical significance, from 1883 to 1956. The three-story section stands at the front, while an extension to the rear telescopes to two stories, then one story. In standard Baltimore rowhouse style, the house has marble steps and a marble clad foundation.

The entry features double doors leading to a vestibule with marble flooring and tiled walls. A further set of glazed double doors leads to the stair hall on the side of the hall. A front parlor is located to the left side of the hallway, followed by the back parlor, connected by pocket doors. A further room was a dining room in the Mencken years, but was originally the kitchen. A new kitchen was built in 1923 and restored and altered in 2019. The second floor front room was Mencken's office from 1925 until his death in 1956. Originally, it had been his parents' bedroom. Mencken's bedroom, where he died, is to the rear on the third floor.

== See also ==
- List of National Historic Landmarks in Maryland
- National Register of Historic Places listings in Central Baltimore
