= Menckeniana: A Schimpflexikon =

Collection of articles and quotations denouncing H. L. Mencken

Menckeniana: A Schimpflexikon is a collection of articles and quotations denouncing H. L. Mencken, collected and arranged by Mencken himself, with the assistance of Sara Haardt, his bride-to-be.

The word “schimpflexikon” is from the German language, which Mencken spoke fluently; it means, roughly, a dictionary of vituperation.

Menckeniana: A Schimpflexikon was printed in a very small quantity by Alfred A. Knopf in 1928. A second edition was printed by Octagon Books in 1977.

Publishers Note

"This collection is not exhaustive, but an effort has been made to keep it representative. The original materials would fill many volumes: they include hundreds of savage articles and newspaper editorials, and a number of whole pamphlets. During the single year 1926 more than 500 separate editorials upon the sayings and doings of Mr. Mencken were printed in the United States, and at least four-fifths of them were unfavorable. Himself given to somewhat ludicrous utterance, he has probably been denounced more vigorously and at greater length than any other American of his time, not even excepting Henry Ford, Robert M. LaFollette, Clarence Darrow, and Sacco and Vanzetti. Here there is room only to offer some salient specimens of this anti-Mencken invective—mainly single sentences or phrases, torn from their incandescent context. Some were chosen for their wit—for there are palpable hits among them!—, some for their blistering ferocity, and some for their charming idiocy. The rest of the material awaits the literary resurrection men of another and perhaps less indignant day."

Chapters
Zoölogical - Genealogical - Pathological - Freudian Diagnoses - Penalogical - As a Critic - As an Artist - As an Evangelist - As an American - As an Intellectual - As a Journalist - As a Truth-Seeker - As an Editor - As a Statesmen - As a Voluptuary - As a Scoundrel - Kosher or Terefah? - Ex-Cathedra - Counter-Offensive - Winces of the Galled - The Voice of the Motherland - Miscellaneous Elegancies - Verdicts in Brief
