= Sowebo =

Historic area in Baltimore, United States

Coordinates: 39°17′15″N 76°38′17″W

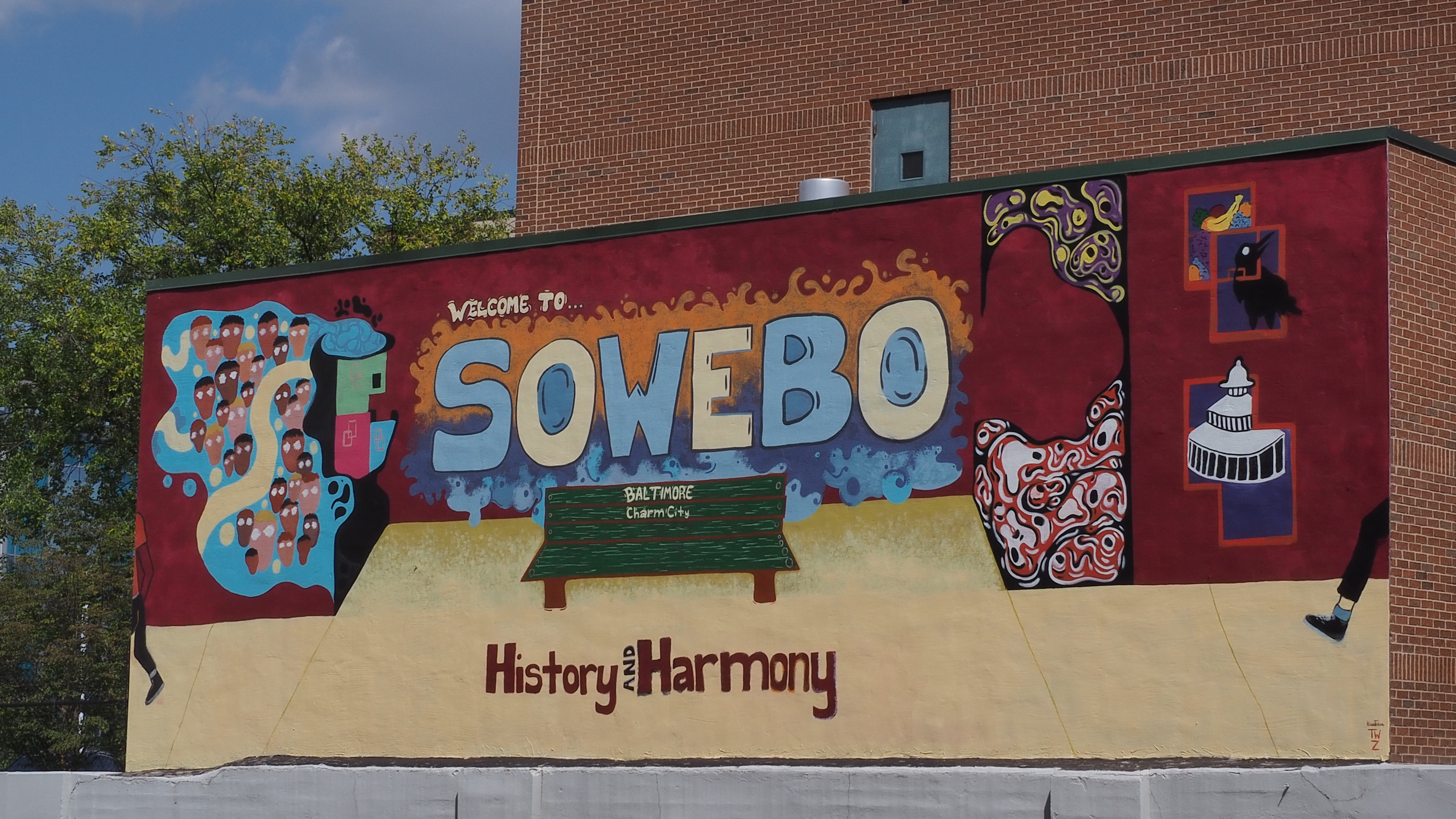
SOWEBO (Southwest Baltimore) History and Harmony Mural on Hollins Street

Sowebo (an abbreviation of South West Baltimore) is a community-chosen name for a historic area in the southwest of the city of Baltimore.

Sowebo encompasses the neighborhoods of Union Square and Hollins Market, Baltimore. At one point, the area suffered from decades of urban decay but, in recent years, this community has seen increasing gentrification. On its main thoroughfares, West Lombard Street, Hollins Street, West Baltimore Street and South Carey Streets, spacious three-story row houses predominate. Most are pre- and post-Civil War Italianate in style, but there are many examples of Early Victorian Greek Revival and Late Victorian Romanesque Revival . A majority of these homes have ten- to fourteen-foot ceilings, tall distinctive windows, wood floors, and plaster walls. Exteriors are brick and mortar facades with cornices and marble steps. On side streets and alley streets (which are common in Baltimore) a variety of two-story and two-story-with-attic rowhouses are found.

An annual arts festival, called the Sowebohemian Arts Festival, is held in the streets around Hollins Market on the Sunday afternoon of the Memorial Day weekend.

The University of Maryland's BioPark is a recent addition, with portions still under construction. The facility contrasts greatly with historic Sowebo, which is listed on the National Register of Historic Places (The Union Square/Hollins Market District ), as is the H.L. Mencken house, which is located in the neighborhood at 1524 Hollins Street.
