= George Bernard Shaw: His Plays =

H. L. Mencken's interpretation of G. Bernard Shaw's plays

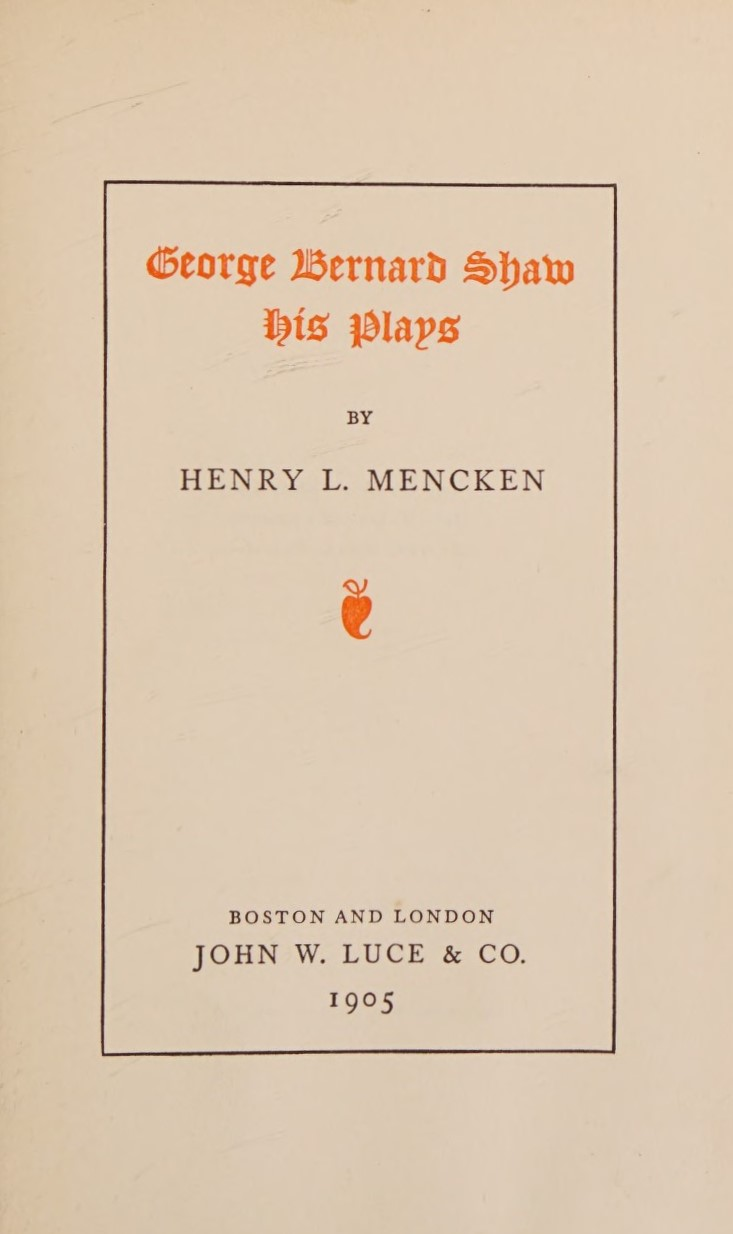
- First edition title page
- Author: H. L. Mencken
- Language: English
- Subject: George Bernard Shaw
- Genre: Literary criticism
- Publisher: John W. Luce & Co
- Publication date: 1905
- Publication place: United States
- Media type: Print
- Pages: 130
- Dewey Decimal: 822.912
- LC Class: PR5367 .M4

George Bernard Shaw: His Plays (1905) is H. L. Mencken's summary and interpretation of George Bernard Shaw's plays. Mencken had been introduced to the works of Shaw by a friend and began work on the book by 1904. The book was published the following year. Some of the reviews of the book were critical of Shaw, who at the time was a controversial figure in the United States.

Mencken's work is the first book to be written about Bernard Shaw's plays in the United States and has been credited as helping to popularize Shaw with American audiences.

== Synopsis ==
Mencken's book contains a preface, an introduction, sections about Shaw's plays and novels, a biographical and statistical section, and a section covering Shaw's thoughts on William Shakespeare plays. The plays, novels, and other works covered in the book include:

- Mrs. Warren's Profession
- Arms and the Man
- The Devil's Disciple
- Widowers' Houses
- The Philanderer
- Captain Brassbound's Conversion
- Cæsar and Cleopatra
- The Man of Destiny (referred to as A Man of Destiny)
- The Admirable Bashville
- Candida
- How He Lied to Her Husband
- You Never Can Tell
- Man and Superman
- John Bull's Other Island
- Major Barbara
- The Irrational Knot
- Love Among the Artists
- Cashel Byron's Profession
- An Unsocial Socialist
- On Going to Church
- The Quintessence of Ibsenism

== Development and publication history ==
Mencken was first introduced to the works of George Bernard Shaw by his friend Will Page, and by 1904, he had begun work on George Bernard Shaw: His Plays. He had initially intended to publish the book through Brentano's, which had published Shaw's work in the United States, but chose to go through John W. Luce after Brentano's declined.

George Bernard Shaw: His Plays was first published in the United States in 1905 through John W. Luce & Co. This was Mencken's first book; he would follow it three years later with The Philosophy of Friedrich Nietzsche.

== Reception and legacy ==
Upon the release of George Bernard Shaw: His Plays, according to Marion Elizabeth Rodgers, many of the reviews were critical and denounced Shaw. Fred Hobson stated that the reviews were generally favorable towards Mencken and that the New York Post "claimed that Mencken was too easily taken in by Shaw". At the time of its initial publication Shaw was seen as a controversial figure in the United States. George Bernard Shaw: His Plays marked the first time a book was written about Shaw in the United States and has been credited as helping to popularize Shaw with American audiences. Mencken stated that the book was responsible for his choice to move from fiction to non-fiction writing. Mencken initially thought that Shaw disapproved of the book; Shaw did enjoy the book, but Mencken only discovered this after his interest in Shaw had waned. In an editor's note for a 1987 printing of George Bernard Shaw: His Plays, William H. Nolte commented that Mencken's lessening interest in Shaw made sense, as "the years disclosed Shaw's extreme didacticism."

Twentieth-Century Literary Criticism negatively reviewed the book, criticizing it as being little more than a summary of the plays with little outside analysis. The Courier-Journal praised its style of writing, saying it was comparable to Shaw's own. The San Francisco Call and Post criticized the introduction, saying the way it was written "does not give you much assurance that he has a seriously good judgment".

Among other contemporary critics, Terry Teachout criticized the book, stating that it was "wholly well-meaning and hopelessly dull". Hobson stated that while writing the book Mencken showed evidence that his reading of Shaw was heavily influenced by Charles Darwin, Thomas Huxley, and Herbert Spencer. Mencken's work contained some errors, such as claiming that Shaw was a Darwinist. Vincent Fitzpatrick compared George Bernard Shaw: His Plays to modern day study guides and wrote that it "generally succeeds in its limited purpose", while criticizing Mencken's writing style.
