= John William Tebbel =

American media historian, journalist (1912-2004)

John William Tebbel (1912–2004), was an American journalist, editor, writer, teacher, and media historian. He was known for his four-volume book, A History of Book Publishing in the United States (1972–1981, Bowker).

== Biography ==
John William Tebbel was born on November 16, 1912, in Boyne City, Michigan to parents Edna Mae (née Johnston) and William Tebbel. He grew up on a farm and began working as a local reporter for the Mount Pleasant Daily Times newspaper in Michigan when he was age 14. Tebbel attended Mount Pleasant High School, graduating in the class of 1931. He received a bachelor's degree (1935) from Central Michigan University; and a master's degree (1937) from Columbia Journalism School.

After graduation, Tebbel served as a reporter for the Detroit Free Press; an editor of The Providence Journal; and managing editor of the American Mercury. In 1943, he joined the editorial team for the Sunday edition of The New York Times.

Tebbel wrote several books about indigenous people of North America. He taught journalism coursework at his alma mater, Columbia Journalism School; and at New York University (NYU) from 1949 to 1976.

Tebbel died on October 10, 2004, in Durham, North Carolina. He was survived by his wife Kathryn Carl and their daughter.

== Publications ==
- Tebbel, John William. (1948). George Horace Lorimer and the Saturday Evening Post [1St ed.] ed. Garden City N.Y: Doubleday.
- Tebbel, John William. (1952). The Life and Good Times of William Randolph Hearst [1St ed.] ed. New York: Dutton.
- Tebbel, John, and Jennison, Keith. (1960) The American Indian Wars Phoenix Press, London.
- Tebbel, John William. (1963). From Rags to Riches; Horatio Alger Jr. and the American Dream. New York: Macmillan.
- Tebbel, John William. (1969). The American Magazine: A Compact History. New York: Hawthorn Books.
- Tebbel, John William. (1969). The Compact History of the American Newspaper New and revised ed. New York: Hawthorn Books.
- Tebbel, John William (1972). A History of Book Publishing in the United States: The Creation of an Industry, 1630-1865. Vol. 1. R. R. Bowker Company. ISBN 9780835204897.
- Tebbel, John William (1975). A History of Book Publishing in the United States: The Expansion of an Industry, 1865-1919. Vol. 2. R. R. Bowker Company.
- Tebbel, John William (1978). A History of Book Publishing in the United States: The Golden Age Between Two Wars, 1920-1940. Vol. 3. R. R. Bowker Company.
- Tebbel, John William (1981). A History of Book Publishing in the United States: The Great Change, 1940-1980. Vol. 4. R. R. Bowker Company.
- Tebbel, John William and Sarah Miles Bolam. (1985). The Press and the Presidency : From George Washington to Ronald Reagan. New York: Oxford University Press.
