= Hollins Market, Baltimore =

Hollins Market
- neighborhood statistical area
- Hollins Market, the oldest public market building still in use in Baltimore

- Location within Baltimore
- Coordinates: 39°17′13″N 76°38′25″W
- Country: United States
- State: Maryland
- City: Baltimore
- Time zone: UTC-5 (Eastern)
  - Summer (DST): UTC-4 (EDT)
- ZIP code: 21223
- Area code: 410, 443, and 667

Hollins Market is a neighborhood in the Sowebo area of Baltimore. It takes its name from the Hollins Market, the oldest public market building still in use in Baltimore City, which is located in the heart of the neighborhood.

Like the adjacent neighborhood Pigtown, Hollins Market has long been considered one of Baltimore's most promising neighborhoods because of its proximity to University of Maryland, Baltimore Medical Center, the Interstate 95 business corridor, Camden Yards, Ravens Stadium, the Inner Harbor, and Downtown Baltimore. Major construction projects such as the University of Maryland Biopark and the pending renovation of the Lion Bros. factory have brought increased attention to the neighborhood.

Similar to Pigtown, Hollins Market has a diverse mix of UMMC students, blue collar workers, artists, and commuters to Fort George G. Meade.

Hollins Market is also home to the Sowebo Arts and Music Festival which draws hundreds of art and music lovers to the neighborhood every Memorial Day Weekend.

== Landmarks and attractions ==
The neighborhood's most significant landmark is the Hollins Market, a two block long structure consisting of space for market stalls, a civic auditorium, and meeting rooms. On the adjacent streets are a variety of locally owned shops and restaurants.

The Lithuanian Hall (Baltimore, Maryland) is located near the neighborhood's eastern boundary. It is a private club that hosts community dances and other events. Like Mobtown Ballroom in Station North, it is known for drawing an eclectic crowd for its lively nightlife and cheap drinks.

The B&O Railroad Museum forms part of the south boundary of the neighborhood. Within Hollins Market itself, is the Irish Shrine and Railroad Workers Museum.

Five small community parks are located within the Hollins Market neighborhood: Carlton Street Park, Little Lithuania Park, Schroeder and Lombard Streets Park, Boyd Street Garden and the B.& O. Park.

== History ==
Hollins Market is adjacent to the neighborhoods of Union Square, Poppleton, Pigtown, and Mount Clare.

The neighborhood of Hollins Market, as well as the market building, were named for the Hollins Family, who previously extensively owned the property west of downtown Baltimore during the early 19th Century where the neighborhood is now located. Hollins Market is predominantly residential, with a commercial district surrounding the market building and along West Baltimore Street.

The neighborhood's boundaries are marked on the west by South Carey Street, to the north by Baltimore Street, to the south by West Pratt Street, and to the east by the Martin Luther King, Jr. Boulevard.

== See also ==
- List of Baltimore neighborhoods
