= A Book of Prefaces =

H.L. Mencken essay collection of 1917

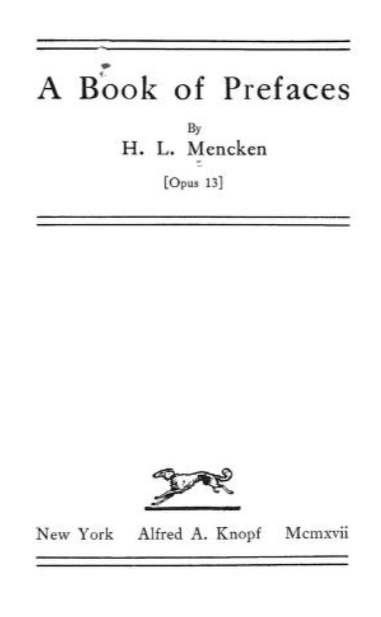
- Title page for A Book of Prefaces (1917)
- Author: H. L. Mencken
- Language: English
- Genre: Essay Collection
- Publication date: 1917
- Publication place: United States
- Pages: 80

A Book of Prefaces is H. L. Mencken's 1917 collection of essays criticizing American culture, authors, and movements. Mencken described the work as "[My] most important book in its effects upon my professional career." In fact, the book was considered vitriolic enough that Mencken's close friend Alfred Knopf was concerned about publishing it because of the massive increase in patriotism during World War I in America.

The book was eighty pages long and divided into four essays. The first three were concerned with specific writers: Theodore Dreiser, Joseph Conrad and James Gibbons Huneker, respectively.

But perhaps the most important, and certainly the most outspoken essay was entitled "Puritanism as a Literary Force," during which he alleged that William Dean Howells, Henry James, and Mark Twain were victims of the Puritan spirit:

The Puritan's utter lack of aesthetic sense, his distrust of all romantic emotion, his unmatchable intolerance of opposition, his unbreakable belief in his own bleak and narrow views, his savage cruelty of attack, his lust for relentless and barbarous persecution – these things have put an almost unbearable burden up on the exchange of ideas in the United States.

Mencken had criticized Puritanism for many years, famously characterizing it as "the haunting fear that someone, somewhere, may be happy," but through World War I his criticism became increasingly outspoken, in part due to the rising tide of Prohibition.

== Response ==
=== Critical response ===
Response to Mencken's book was generally poor, but certain defenders of American culture were particularly outspoken in their criticism of the book—most notably Stuart Sherman, a professor at the University of Illinois (Sherman was personally attacked in Prefaces). According to Sherman:

"[Mencken] leaps from the saddle with sabre flashing, stables his horse in the church, shoots the priest, hangs three professors, exiles the Academy, burns the library and the university, and amid smoking ashes, erects a new school of criticism on modern German principles."

Other major critics included Paul Elmer More and Irving Babbitt, although neither of these was as vitriolic as Sherman.

=== Mencken's response ===
According to Mencken, Sherman's review was "a masterly exposure of what is going on in the Puritan mind, and particularly of its maniacal fear of the German."

"The curse of criticism in America is the infernal babbling of third-rate college professor... [the Book of Prefaces] shook the professors as they had never been shaken before."

== Sources ==
- Bode, Carl Mencken. Southern Illinois University Press, London, 1969.
- Hobson, Fred Mencken. Random House, New York, 1994.
- Manchester, William Disturber of the Peace. University of Massachusetts Press, Amherst, 1986.
