= In Defense of Women =

1918 by H.L. Mencken

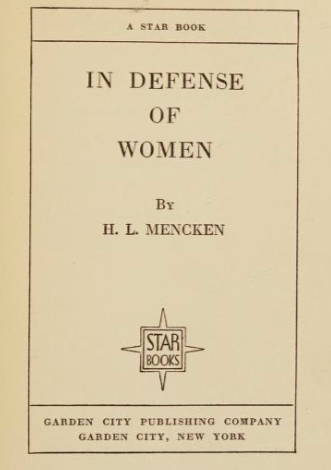
- Title page for In Defense of Women (1922 edition)
- Author: H. L. Mencken
- Publication date: 1918

In Defense of Women is H. L. Mencken's 1918 book on women and the relationship between the sexes. Some laud the book as progressive while others brand it as reactionary. While Mencken did not champion women's rights, he described women as wiser in many novel and observable ways, while demeaning average men.

According to Mencken's biographer, Fred Hobson:

Depending on the position of the reader, he was either a great defender of women's rights or, as a critic labelled him in 1916, "the greatest misogynist since Schopenhauer", "the country's high-priest of woman-haters."

== History ==
The original title for Defense was A Book for Men Only, but other working titles included The Eternal Feminine as well as The Infernal Feminine. The book was originally published by Philip Goodman in 1918, but Mencken released a new edition in 1922 in an attempt to bring the book to a wider audience. This second edition, published by Alfred Knopf, was both much longer and milder.

== Content ==
=== General ===
In general, biographers describe Defense as "ironic": it was not so much a defense of women as a critique of the relationship between the sexes. Topics covered by the book included "Woman's Equipment," "Compulsory Marriage," "The Emancipated Housewife," and "Women as Martyrs." Women were gaining rights, according to Mencken—the ability to partake in adultery without lasting public disgrace, the ability to divorce men, and even some escape from the notion of virginity as sacred, which remained as "one of the hollow conventions of Christianity." Women nonetheless remained restrained by social conventions in many capacities.

=== Suffrage ===
Mencken's love of women was driven in part by the sympathy he had for female literary characters (especially those brought to life by his friend Theodore Dreiser), as well as his almost fanatical love of his mother. Mencken supported women's rights, even if he had no affection for the suffragist.

Although he originally intended to be ironic when he proclaimed that women were the superior gender, many of the qualities he assigned to them were qualities he deeply admired – realism and skepticism among them, but also manipulative skill and a detached view of humankind.

=== "Demeaning" ===
Mencken praised women, though he believed they should remain in the background of industry and politics. In personal letters especially, Mencken would write that women should appreciate men and do their best to support them. Although Mencken did not intend to demean women, his description of his "ideal scene" with a woman in the 1922 edition was not conventionally progressive:

It is the close of a busy and vexatious day—say half past five or six o'clock of a winter afternoon. I have had a cocktail or two, and am stretched out on a divan in front of a fire, smoking. At the edge of the divan, close enough for me to reach her with my hands, sits a woman not too young, but still good-looking and well dressed—above all, a woman with a soft, low-pitched, agreeable voice. As I snooze she talks—of anything, everything, all the things that women talk of: books, music, the play, men, other women. No politics. No business. No religion. No metaphysics. Nothing challenging and vexatious—but remember, she is intelligent; what she says is clearly expressed... Gradually I fall asleep—but only for an instant... then to sleep again—slowly and charmingly down that slippery hill of dreams. And then awake again, and then asleep again, and so on. I ask you seriously: could anything be more unutterably beautiful?

Mencken often espoused views of politics, religion, and metaphysics that stressed their grotesqueness and absurdity; in this context, escape from the supposed fraud of such somber subjects was welcome to him.

== Critical reviews ==
The book was reviewed very well: according to Carl Bode, there were four times as many favorable reviews as unfavorable.

The first edition of the book sold fewer than 900 copies, a disappointing showing. The second edition sold much better, during the more progressive Roaring Twenties.
