= Sara Mayfield =

American writer (1905–1979)

- Born: Sara Martin Mayfield; September 10, 1905; Montgomery, Alabama, US
- Died: January 10, 1979 (aged 73); Tuscaloosa, Alabama, US
- Education: Goucher College; University of London; Sorbonne University; University of Alabama
- Occupations: author, journalist, inventor
- Writing career
- Genre: Biography
- Notable works: The Constant Circle: H.L. Menken and His Friends; Exiles from Paradise: Zelda and F. Scott Fitzgerald; Mona Lisa, the Woman in the Portrait; a Fictional Biography

Sara Mayfield (September 10, 1905 – January 15, 1979) was an American writer, journalist, and inventor. Her writing included plays, novels, short stories, and newspaper articles.

== Early life and education ==
Mayfield spent her early life in Montgomery, Alabama where her childhood acquaintances included Tallulah Bankhead, Zelda Fitzgerald, and Sara Haardt.

Mayfield attended Goucher College in Baltimore, Maryland. While there, she won a short-story prize in 1924, which brought her into contact with the journalist and satirist H. L. Mencken. Menken invited Mayfield to supper at Baltimore's Schellhase Palazzo restaurant. As a chaperone, she took her friend Haardt. After a lengthy courtship, Menken and Haardt married on August 27, 1930, in Baltimore.

== Writing ==
Mayfield penned three book-length works: The Constant Circle: H.L. Mencken and His Friends; Exiles from Paradise: Zelda and Scott Fitzgerald; and Mona Lisa, the Woman in the Portrait: a Fictional Biography in addition to numerous articles for the Baltimore Sun, the Paris Herald, the New York Herald Tribune, Transradio Press, and the Birmingham News. She worked as an assistant editor at the University of Alabama Press from 1967 to 1969.

== Inventions ==
In 1946, Mayfield experimented with byproducts from cotton productions. She devised a method for combining waste cellulose with water, which caused the material to harden into a durable material with marketable applications. She called the material Plasticast and incorporated a business called Southern Cellulose Corporation to develop the material's potential.

== Confinement ==
Following what she considered erratic behavior, Susie Mayfield, Mayfield's mother, had her daughter taken from their home, Idlewyld, in Tuscaloosa, Alabama and confined to Bryce Hospital on March 23, 1948. Zelda Fitzgerald had perished two weeks earlier on March 10 at Highland Hospital in Asheville, North Carolina. Mayfield was released from Bryce on February 25, 1965.
