= Hollins Market =

- U.S. National Register of Historic Places
- U.S. Historic district – Contributing property
- Hollins Market Facade

- Location within Baltimore Location within Maryland Location within the United States
- Location: Baltimore, Maryland, U.S.
- Coordinates: 39°17′13″N 76°38′25″W
- Built: 1838
- Architectural style: Greek Revival, Italianate
- NRHP reference No.: 83002941
- Added to NRHP: September 15, 1983

Hollins Market viewed from the corner of Hollins & Arlington.

Hollins Market is the name of the oldest existing public market building in the city of Baltimore, Maryland. It is a contributing property to the Union Square-Hollins Market Historic District.

The market, located at 26 South Arlington Ave, just west of downtown Baltimore, runs the length of the 1100 block of Hollins St between South Arlington and South Carrollton Avenues. In 1829 the city granted the petition of a piano manufacturer named Joseph Newman and his brother Elias Newman, who together in 1842 founded Newman & Bros., (of whose pianos two are in the inventory of the Smithsonian), to erect a market house at their own expense on land donated by banker George B. Dunbar. That structure blew down in a windstorm in 1838; the market was rebuilt and opened the following year. The market was expanded in 1864 through a $23,000 appropriation by the city to construct the Italianate addition. The market, which is currently operated by the non-profit Baltimore Public Markets Corporation, is 29,803 square feet (2,769 m^{2})

The Hollins Market building is at the center of the Hollins Market neighborhood. It is the geographical heart of what many refer to as SOWEBO, and on the Sunday of Memorial Day weekend, is the center of an arts festival called Sowebohemian Arts Festival. Hollins (Public) Market is currently closed for renovations. Construction is underway to add and rejuvenate the following stall types: Fresh and Prepared Seafood, Fresh and Prepared Poultry, International Foods, Full Service Bakery, Salad/Deli, Grocery/Cafe + Pop-Up. The market was previously open Tuesday through Thursday 7:00 a.m. to 6:00 p.m., Friday and Saturday from 6:00 a.m. to 6:00 p.m. It was closed on Sundays and Mondays, but according to the BPMC will be open seven days a week after reopening.

Hollins Market has a rich history anchoring the surrounding neighborhood. In the early 1900s, many other businesses flourished around the market on Hollins Street and other adjacent streets, including Riggy's Bar, Zirclears Bakery, Santo's Barbershop, etc. Rumor had it, that Santo Scalco thought Hollins Market was such a great location, that he moved his barbershop from across the street from the Whitehouse where he cut several Presidents hair to 1141 Hollins St., which was at Hollins St. and Carrollton Ave. In the 1980s Hollins Market had numerous bars and restaurants, including The Cultured Pearl.

The 1990 Barry Levinson film Avalon depicts Hollins Market in the mid-1900s. The forthcoming Apple+ TV Series Lady in the Lake filmed in and outside of the public market.
