= Leonard Keene Hirshberg =

American physician (1877–1969)

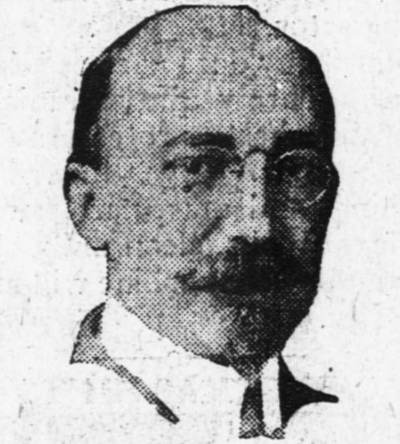
- Born: January 9, 1877; Baltimore
- Died: October 1, 1969 (aged 92); Long Beach, New York
- Education: Johns Hopkins School of Medicine
- Occupations: Physician, writer
- Criminal charge: Mail fraud

Leonard Keene Hirshberg (January 9, 1877 – October 1, 1969) was an American physician and popular medical writer who was convicted of mail fraud.

== Early life and education ==
Hirshberg was born in Baltimore to a Jewish family. He earned his M.D. from Johns Hopkins University in 1902.

== Writing career ==
He had a successful career as a health writer, with his articles appearing in mainstream medical columns and journals. With H. L. Mencken as writer, he collaborated on a series of baby care articles for the magazine The Delineator that were published as What You Ought to Know About Your Baby (1910). The first edition of the book listed only Hirshberg as author. According to Mencken, at least some of Hirshberg's other magazine articles were also written by Mencken with Hirshberg providing the information. In 1913, he resigned from the Baltimore County Medical Society while under investigation for magazine articles that stated incorrectly that cures had been discovered for cancer and leprosy.

Hirshberg was skeptical of spiritualism. He was highly critical of the claims of the medium Eusapia Palladino.

== Fraud and imprisonment ==
Around 1920, Hirshberg moved to New York, where he became active as a stock broker. In September 1922, he was accused of defrauding investors of one million dollars in a mail fraud investment scam. He was convicted and was imprisoned in the federal prison at Atlanta from May 1923 to June 1925.

== Later life ==
While in prison, Hirshberg continued to write untruthful articles. In December 1923, the New York World reported that he claimed to have developed a means to eradicate boll weevils, and was researching abnormal psychology by observing his fellow prisoners. He lost his medical license in 1926 and after that promoted quack remedies. Since the early 1920s, he had had a home in Long Beach, New York, where he moved permanently in about 1945. He wrote a weekly column, The Laughable World, first in local newspapers and from 1955 privately published, and in his eighties received a weekly stipend from the Long Beach chamber of commerce as a writer.

== Personal life and death ==
Hirshberg and his wife had two children. When he moved to New York, he took with him a 15-year-old girl, as reported by the Baltimore American when his wife sued him for abandonment in 1923. They were divorced, and he apparently married his girlfriend in 1926. Fulton Oursler wrote in his autobiography that in Baltimore, Hirshberg researched his articles in the library with beautiful young "stenographers", and that because of his wife's complaints, an indictment in Maryland had to be quashed through the intervention of William Randolph Hearst after a request from Marion Davies before Hirshberg could be released on Oursler's recognizance.

Hirshberg was vegetarian; in Long Beach he was known for consuming the parsley from all the dishes at dinners. He also swam daily in the ocean. He died in 1969 in Long Beach, aged 92.

== Selected publications ==
- "Popular Medical Fallacies". (1906). American Magazine 62: 655-660.
- What You Ought to Know About Your Baby (1910, with H. L. Mencken))
- "The Truth About Tobacco". (1913). Harpers Weekly.
- "The Case Against Madame Eusapia Palladino" (1910). The Medical Critic and Guide.
- Low Calorie Diet Cook Book (1954)
- The Family Diet Guide (1959)
