= The Libido for the Ugly =

1926 essay by H. L. Mencken

"The Libido for the Ugly" is an essay by H. L. Mencken (1880–1956), a Baltimore journalist, satirist, and social critic of the American scene.

"The Libido for the Ugly" was first published in 1926 as a column in the Baltimore Evening Sun and next in Mencken's book Prejudices: Sixth Series (New York: Alfred A. Knopf, 1927). Since then, the essay has been widely reprinted and celebrated in anthologies.

Rhetorically, the piece uses Juvenalian satire to lampoon the industrial blight of Pittsburgh and Western Pennsylvania, the nation's leading industrial district in the 1920s. Mencken writes from the point of view of a passenger on an east-bound express train of the Pennsylvania Railroad. Specifically, the speaker is scanning the landscape between Pittsburgh's East Liberty station and Greensburg, declaiming an endemic ugliness in architecture and poverty and nature. This industrial ugliness, he claims, is shameful and in contrast to the quaint charm of Europe's poor and rural villages. His overall conclusion about American industrialization is "out of the melting pot emerges a race which hates beauty."
