= Happy Days, 1880–1892 =

Book by H.L. Mencken

- First edition
- Author: H.L. Mencken
- Genre: Autobiography
- Publisher: Alfred A. Knopf
- Publication date: 1940

Happy Days, 1880–1892 (1940) is the first of an autobiographical trilogy by H.L. Mencken, covering his days as a child in Baltimore, Maryland from birth through age twelve. It was followed by Newspaper Days, 1899–1906 (1941) and Heathen Days, 1890–1936 (1943).

The book was received with some surprise by Mencken's readers, since, unlike his commentaries on current events, it is written with great warmth and affection. Mencken's childhood was apparently happy and secure, and he enjoyed both living through it and reminiscing about it in later years.

== Editions ==
- Happy Days: Mencken's Autobiography: 1880–1892 (Johns Hopkins University Press: Bumcombe Collection, 2006) ISBN 0801885310
