= Union Square, Baltimore =

- Union Square-Hollins Market Historic District
- U.S. National Register of Historic Places
- U.S. Historic district
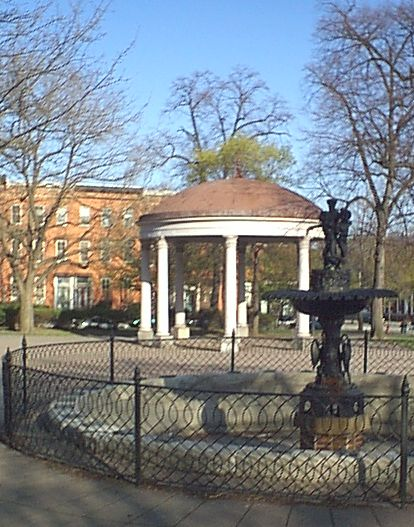
- Union Square

- Location within Baltimore
- Location: Roughly bounded by Fulton, Fayette, Pratt and Schroeder Streets, Baltimore, Maryland
- Coordinates: 39°17′13″N 76°38′25″W
- Area: 479 acres (194 ha)
- Built: 1830
- Architectural style: Greek Revival, Other, Federal, Italianate
- NRHP reference No.: 83002941
- Added to NRHP: September 15, 1983

A view of Union Square park

Union Square is a neighborhood located in the Sowebo area of Baltimore. It dates to the 1830s and includes a historic district of houses and commerce buildings.

== Overview ==
Named for the graceful park at its center, Union Square is a diverse urban setting - home to art galleries, artist studios, H. L. Mencken's lifelong residence, and spacious three-story Italianate and Victorian rowhouses. On the historic ground of Southwest Baltimore is known to locals as "Sowebo" (SouthWest Baltimore). Union Square is less than a mile from Camden Yards and within walking distance of the "Inner Harbor" (formerly known as "The Basin" of the harbor), the Northwest Branch of the Patapsco River, the B&O Railroad Museum, Ravens Stadium (later known as M. & T. Bank Stadium), and the University of Maryland at Baltimore, (the original and founding campus of the U. of M. system, from 1807). The state-of-the-art U.M.B. Biotech Park on West Baltimore Street is a recent addition, with portions still under construction. One of the several public golf courses is nearby in Carroll Park, also home to the historic Mount Clare Mansion of 1754 built by Charles Carroll, Barrister, (1723-1783), next to the newly renovated Montgomery Park office building, formerly the store and regional warehouse of the Montgomery Ward & Company, famous for their catalog orders and sales in the last century. Access to several transportation directions are minutes away with the Martin Luther King, Jr. Boulevard running in an arch around the west side of downtown with its connection to the Jones Falls Expressway, (Interstate 83) going north towards the Baltimore-Harrisburg Expressway, the main East Coast highway, north to south is Interstate 95 with its Fort McHenry Tunnel and the Baltimore Harbor Tunnel cutting under the harbor and port of the Patapsco River and the commuter rail service MARC Train beginning in the northeastern corner of the state at Havre de Grace at the head of the Chesapeake Bay down to Baltimore and onto Washington, D.C. 40 miles away. Surrounding the city is the encircling Baltimore Beltway which is also Interstate 695 and connects via four parallel highways, from east to west: Interstate 95, then the Baltimore-Washington Parkway which is also (Md. Route 295 and Interstate 295), and the old historic Washington Boulevard from colonial times now of U.S. Route 1, and further to the west is U.S. Route 29, all connecting to the Capital Beltway around the Nation's Capital, in Maryland and Virginia, Interstate 495.

== Attractions ==
Hollins Market

=== Union Square Park ===
A 2.5-acre (10,000 m^{2}) public space at the west side of the neighborhood, Union Square Park dates from 1847 and contains the community's signature structure, a Greek Revival Pavilion (1850) with fluted iron columns. Other features include the H. L. Mencken Memorial Fountain (1976) and curved walkways with park benches. Throughout the year, there are many impromptu events in the Square, including neighborhood dinners, outdoor movies, tag sales, Easter egg hunts, Halloween pumpkin carvings, and various other parties.

=== Hollins Market ===
A vital part of the community, Hollins Market was built in the Italianate style in 1838 at the east side of the neighborhood and is Baltimore's oldest home to food merchants.

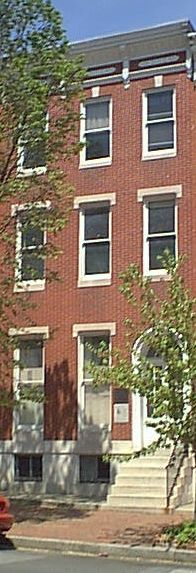
H. L. Mencken House

Sowebohemian Arts Festival

=== Mencken House ===
The H. L. Mencken House is located at 1524 Hollins Street. Baltimore's famous son, Henry Louis Mencken, lived here from 1883 until his death in 1956. More details in History section (below).

=== Arts festival ===
An annual event - the Sowebohemian Arts Festival - is held in the streets around Hollins Market on the Sunday afternoon of the Memorial Day weekend.

==== Other highlights ====
Also in the Union Square Historic District, attractions include annual events such as the Union Square Christmas Cookie Tour plus the Black Cherry Puppet Theater, the Enoch Pratt Free Library No. 2 Branch (1886), and Sowebo Arts, Inc.

==== Nearby attractions ====
Other nearby sites of interest include the B&O Railroad Museum, the Lithuanian Hall, Carroll Park, the Mount Clare Museum, the Babe Ruth Museum, the Irish Shrine and Railroad Workers Memorial Museum, and the Edgar Allan Poe House and Museum.

== Historic district ==
The Union Square-Hollins Market Historic District is a dense area of rowhouses and commercial structures located approximately 10 blocks west of the Inner Harbor in Baltimore. The district contains approximately 1,321 buildings with about 31 structures which do not contribute to the district. There are two major features in the district: Union Square Park, a speculative park and housing development of the 1840s, and Hollins Market, an Italianate style market house built in 1838 and 1864. The remainder of the district developed after 1830 mainly as housing for workers in nearby industries and consist of low scale, two and three story brick vernacular dwellings while larger, high-style rowhouses surround the park.

The Union Square-Hollins Market Historic District was listed on the National Register of Historic Places in 1983.

Union Square Rowhouses

== Real estate ==
On the Square and on nearby streets, spacious three-story rowhouses predominate. Most are pre- and post-Civil War Italianate in style, but there are many examples of Early Victorian Greek Revival and Late Victorian Romanesque Revival. A majority of the homes have ten- to fourteen-foot ceilings, tall distinctive windows, wood floors, and plaster walls. Exteriors are brick and mortar facades with attractive cornices and marble steps. On the side streets and alleys there are an additional variety of charming two-story and two-story-with-attic rows. House prices range from $40,000 to $400,000.

=== Schools ===
==== Southwest Baltimore Charter School ====
Opened in August 2005, the Southwest Baltimore Charter School (SBCS) is located at 31 South Schroeder Street. Its K – 4 enrollment serves a diverse population in southwest Baltimore City. SBCS accomplishments include increases in reading performance across all grade levels and student performances at Taste the Arts, a Young Audiences Gala and fundraiser.

==== Steuart Hill Academy (Baltimore City School #4) ====
Steuart Hill Academy is located at 30 South Gilmor Street directly across the street from Union Square Park. The school was originally named Steuart Hill Elementary as a pre-K –6 school. The school's playground was torn down in 1999 and the school went without a playground for 4 years until awareness was brought to the attention of the city by a group of the students. In 2002 these students were presented a grant from the Department of Parks and Recreation for $1 million. This money was used to rebuild their playground and several other Baltimore City playgrounds as well. In 2002, Steuart Hill Academy enrolled as a pre-K – 8 school.

== Boundaries ==

The District is bounded by South Fulton Street to the west and South Schroeder Street to the east, with north and south borders of West Baltimore and West Pratt Streets. Union Square proper, just west of the Market, is bounded by S. Stricker and S. Gilmore Streets from the east and west respectively, and by Hollins and W. Lombard Streets to the north and south. The area is built on a grid street system which conforms to the original 1818 layout of the area. Zip Code: 21223.

== History ==
=== Origins ===
Begun during the influx of English, Irish and German immigration of the 1830s, the Union Square / Hollins Market Historic District is a dense area of rowhouses that includes Federal, Greek Revival and Italianate architectural styles. To the west, Union Square Park contains an ornate fountain and Greek Revival pavilion, and forms one of the two open spaces preserved in the neighborhood. Hollins Market, in the east, is an Italianate-style market house built in 1838 and expanded in 1864, and is the oldest city market still in operation.

A large part of the neighborhood is built on the former estate of merchant-shipper Thorowgood Smith (1744–1810). Smith was Baltimore's second mayor, from 1804 to 1808, filling the vacancy caused by the resignation of James Calhoun (Calhoun Street passes through the Union Square neighborhood). In 1799, Smith built his summer home, Willow Brook, in the Palladian style popular in mid-18th century England and the United States. At the time, the property was on the outskirts of the city. Across town, next door to the Shot Tower (1828), Smith's principal residence is restored as the Circa 1790 Home, open to the public, and maintained by the Women's Civic League.

Upon the death of the childless Smith, the villa with twenty-six acres passed to his wife, the former Mary Blaikley Stith (1750–1822) and then to a nephew, merchant and privateer John Donnell.

Donnell was responsible for parceling out the first plots of land for the construction of homes. Three sons of John Donnell leased grounds around the park, laid out specifications for houses, and graded and paved streets bordering the Square in the 1840s.

Dubbed “Millionaire's Row,” the portion of Stricker Street facing the Square featured the Italianate residences of bankers, investors, and factory owners. Other variations of the Italianate style lined the blocks leading up to and surrounding the square. Less ornate homes were put up in groups on side and alley streets, but all shared many identical features such as cornices, marble steps, and iron work. Developers and homeowners attempted to build the most economic dwellings possible, so they crammed narrow rowhouses along every road, avenue and alley in the district. Common brick was often used on side walls, with hard surface English brick on the front. The largest rooms were typically the front parlors and master bedrooms – smaller rooms were placed to the rear.

Ceiling medallions, cornices, staircase millwork, and fireplace designs were individualized features, chosen from home order catalogs. Most of the wrought or cast ironwork in the neighborhood was made in the Hayward, Bartlett, and Co. Factory near the B&O Yards to the south of the neighborhood. The buildings were brick and low-scale – no more than three stories except for some commercial buildings. Evenly spaced doorsteps, windows, and doors, as well as continuous rooflines create the visual rhythms for which Baltimore rowhouses are noted. Although residential construction ended in the 1880s, commercial building continued into the early 20th century.

The two-and-one-half acres for the park was approved for that use and donated by the Donnells in 1847. The park is one block square, bordered by Lombard, Stricker, Gilmor, and Hollins streets. The landscape of Union Square – with its walkways, pavilion, fountain, and wrought iron lamps – recalls Victorian Era Baltimore. Architect John F. Hoss designed the iron Greek-style pavilion with fluted columns in 1850 – it covers a natural spring that was once accessible by steps and, at one time, supplied water to the B&O Railroad. The source of the name “Union Square” is uncertain but probably reflects the patriotic sentiment of this time before the Civil War. Fog scenes of the Square, lights agleam over wet pavements and barren limbs, were often featured in local landscape artistry.

Willow Brook, the estate house, was acquired in 1864 by Emily Caton McTavish, granddaughter of Charles Carroll (a signer of the Declaration of Independence), and daughter of General Winfield “Old Fuss and Feathers” Scott (a hero in the War of 1812 and unsuccessful Whig presidential candidate in 1852). Within a year, she donated it to the Roman Catholic Church as a school for delinquent girls, under the administration of the Congregation of the Good Shepherd. Additions and renovations changed the original structure over the next 100 years until the school closed in 1965, the property was sold, and the buildings were dismantled. Willow Brook's interior oval drawing room had long enjoyed national acclaim and, still intact, it was moved to the Baltimore Museum of Art for public and permanent display. Steuart Hill Elementary School was constructed on the site. The area was designated a National Register Historic District in 1967, two years after Willow Brook was razed.

The original iron urns in the park were smelted down during World War II for the war effort. Economic decline occurred in the mid-20th until extensive rehabilitation began during a renaissance in the 1960s and 1970s. The Square benefitted from new lighting, shrubs, pink sidewalks, and cast iron benches installed during the 1970s.

=== Hollins Market ===

The city's oldest market structure still in use, Hollins Market is part of the Baltimore public market system that began in 1763. In 1835, the City granted a petition of piano manufacturer Joseph Newman and “others” to erect a market house at their own expense. Banker George T. Dunbar donated the land which, at that time, was on the western fringe of the city. The doors opened in September 1836 and the market soon became very successful, but the fragile structure blew down in a windstorm two years later. Newman organized the effort to quickly rebuild and re-open the market by the end of 1839. The market was named for John Smith Hollins (1786–1856), an estate owner in West Baltimore and one-term mayor of the city from 1852 to 1854. In 1863, the City Council appropriated $23,000 to erect the high-ceilinged Italianate red brick edifice as an addition to the old market house. As this was during the divisive time of the Civil War, the council refused to consider any bid for the market's construction that did not come from “parties... known to be thoroughly and unconditionally Union Men.”

By 1900, Hollins Market stretched from Poppleton to Carey Streets, with 160 inside and 180 outside stalls. Over the years, an assortment of West Baltimore butchers, various European and Asian immigrants with vendor traditions, and African-American merchants have all sold and purchased meats, farm-fresh produce, baked goods, and home-produced wares. Somewhat smaller today, the traditions and diversity of the market and the quality of goods still holds true. The 1990 Barry Levinson film “Avalon” depicts Hollins Market in its heyday.

Hollins Market, at 26 South Arlington Street, is open Monday through Saturday from 7:00 a.m. to 6:00 p.m. It is closed on Sunday.

=== Malachai Mills ===
At 1504 W. Baltimore Street is the residence of Malachai Mills, a free-born African-American businessman in the early and mid-19th century. Mr. Mills was a prominent cabinetmaker and carpenter, providing furnishings and carpentry for many of the early homes in the neighborhood. Bill Adler of the Union Square neighborhood is at the head of a preservation effort to revitalize this valuable structure as a “historic life museum” and as a preservation, fine arts, or urban studies field site for local universities.

=== H. L. Mencken House ===
Designated a National Historic Landmark in 1985, this Italianate brick row house at 1524 Hollins Street was the home of one of Baltimore's most famous citizens – noted Baltimore Sun journalist and author Henry Louis Mencken lived here from 1883 until his death in 1956. Mencken wrote of his home: “I have lived in one house in Baltimore for nearly 45 years. It has changed in that time, as I have – but somehow it still remains the same.... It is as much a part of me as my two hands. If I had to leave it I'd be as certainly crippled as if I lost a leg.”

After his death on January 26, 1956, his home was bequeathed to the University of Maryland. In 1983 the City of Baltimore acquired the H. L. Mencken House from the university, in exchange for the Old Pine Street Station. With period furniture, his restored second-floor office, and backyard gazebo, the H. L. Mencken House opened as part of the City Life Museums and a center for theatrical, literary and musical events. Although the City Life Museums closed in 1997, a $3 million donation from retired naval commander Max Hency allowed the organization to begin renovating the house, and it opened to the public in 2019, though only by prior reservation.

== Celebrating History ==
The park and fountain – as well as parts of Stricker, Hollins and Lombard streets – were transported back to the 1850s when Union Square played the title role in the lush 1997 movie adaptation of Henry James's biting novel Washington Square from acclaimed director Agnieszka Holland.

The excitement continued in 1997 as the community celebrated the sesquicentennial of Union Square with a re-dedication of the park including the placement of a stone tablet commemorating the event at the foot of one of the pavilion columns. The celebration was highlighted with concerts and a marching band performance, and the dedication of a new park at Pratt and Gilmor streets.

== Demographics ==
As of the census of 2000, there were 5,420 people living in the neighborhood. The racial makeup of Union Square was 30.2% White, 63.4% African American, 0.0% Native American, 3.0% Asian, 1.1% from other races, and 2.3% from two or more races. Hispanic or Latino of any race were 1.1% of the population. 38.0% of occupied housing units were owner-occupied. 34.9% of housing units were vacant.

49.5% of the population were employed, 7.4% were unemployed, and 43.7% were not in the labor force. The median household income was $30,765. About 14.9% of families and 27.5% of the population were below the poverty line.
