= The Philosophy of Friedrich Nietzsche =

1908 book by H.L. Mencken

- Author: H. L. Mencken
- Language: English
- Subject: Friedrich Nietzsche
- Published: 1908
- Publication place: United States
- Media type: Print

The Philosophy of Friedrich Nietzsche is a book by H. L. Mencken, the first edition appearing in 1908. The book covers both better- and lesser-known areas of Friedrich Nietzsche's life and philosophy. Mencken prepared for writing this book by reading all of Nietzsche's published philosophy, including several works in the original German.

== Literary reception ==
Following its publication, The Philosophy of Friedrich Nietzsche quickly became a popular resource to scholars and lay audiences alike, though this is likely because few such publications existed in English at that time. Mencken himself translated The Antichrist for use in his compendium.

Despite the best available information at the time, some of the particulars of Nietzsche's life that Mencken described are now known to be false. Mencken also often – albeit unintentionally – permitted his personal biases (especially his own views on social Darwinism and, potentially, antisemitism) to influence his interpretations; for instance, he erroneously equated Nietzsche's "will to power" with Arthur Schopenhauer's "will to live." At times Mencken also failed to explain Nietzsche's philosophies, but some of his analyses are still considered cogent, especially regarding Nietzsche's theory of drama and views on Christianity. Mencken's immersion in and enthusiasm for his subject may mark the beginning of "Nietzsche Studies" in America.
