= Lithuanian Hall =

Home of the Lithuanian Hall Association

Lithuanian Hall (Lietuvių Namai)
- Lith Hall
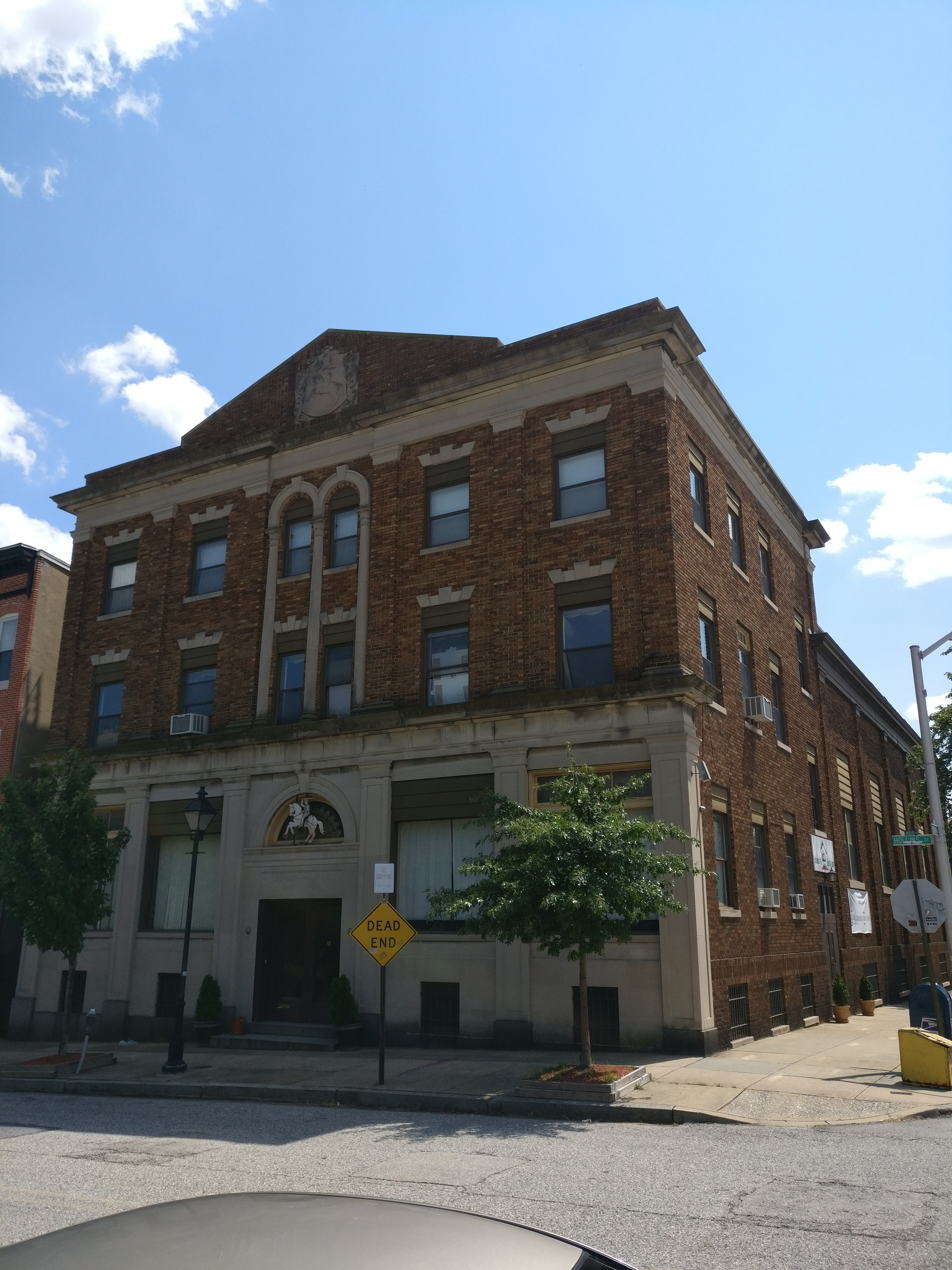
- Interactive map of Lithuanian Hall (Lietuvių Namai)
- Former names: Lietuvių Namai (1917–1968)
- Location: 851 Hollins Street; Baltimore, Maryland, United States
- Coordinates: 39°17′16″N 76°37′50″W
- Type: Dance venue

Construction
- Opened: 1917

Website
- https://www.lithuanianhall.com/ Lithuanian Hall official webpage

The Lithuanian Hall (Lithuanian: Lietuvių Namai), also known as Lith Hall, is the home of the Lithuanian Hall Association. It is a private club located on Hollins Street in the Hollins Market neighborhood of Baltimore, Maryland and serves as a recreation center and meeting house for social events, including dance nights, musical events, community suppers and cultural events. The hall was founded to serve the needs of the Lithuanian community in Baltimore, Maryland. The hall is popular with artists and hipsters.

== History ==
The hall was established in 1921, and was only referred to by the Lithuanian name Lietuvių Namai until 1968.

During the 1920s the hall was provided as a venue for speeches by prominent members of the Communist Party USA, such as William Z. Foster and Juliet Stuart Poyntz. On October 13, 1929, a Jewish branch of the CPUSA hosted a speech by Sol Hurwitz, the editor of the Jewish Daily Forward, and the speech was interrupted by a mob of anti-Communists. The Communists defended themselves with chairs until the police arrived to disperse the mob.
