= Menken =

Menken is a surname. Notable people with the surname include:

- Adah Isaacs Menken (1835–1868), American actress, painter and poet
- Alan Menken (born 1949), American musical theatre and film composer and pianist
- Carol Menken-Schaudt (born 1957), American basketball player and 1984 Olympic gold medalist
- Helen Menken (1901–1966), American actress
- Marie Menken (1909–1970), American experimental filmmaker and socialite
- Shepard Menken (1921–1999), American voice actor and character actor
- S. Stanwood Menken (1870–1954), American attorney, founder of the National Security League

== See also ==
- Mencken (surname)
