= H. L. Mencken =

American journalist and writer (1880–1956)

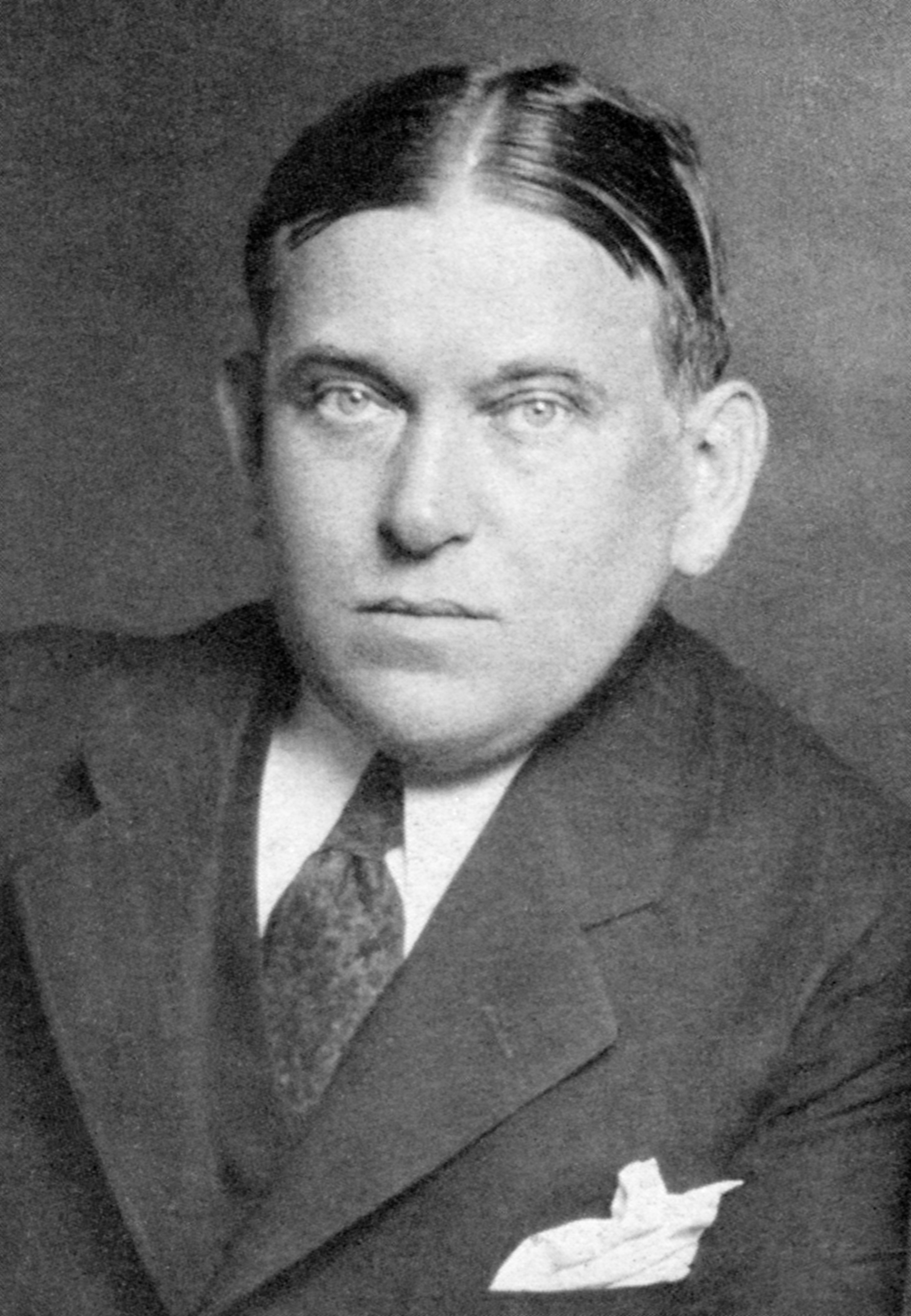
- Mencken in 1928
- Born: Henry Louis Mencken; September 12, 1880; Baltimore, Maryland, US
- Died: January 29, 1956 (aged 75); Baltimore, Maryland, US
- Occupations: Journalist; essayist; satirist; social critic
- Notable credit: The Baltimore Sun
- Spouse: Sara Haardt (m. 1930; died 1935)
- Parent: August Mencken Sr.
- Relatives: August Mencken Jr. (brother)

Henry Louis Mencken (September 12, 1880 – January 29, 1956) was an American journalist, essayist, satirist, cultural critic, and scholar of American English. He commented widely on literature, music, prominent politicians, and contemporary movements. His satirical reporting on the Scopes trial, which he dubbed the "Monkey Trial", also earned him attention. The term Menckenian has entered multiple dictionaries to describe anything of or pertaining to Mencken, including his combative rhetorical and prose styles.

As a scholar, Mencken is known for The American Language, a multi-volume study of how the English language is spoken in the United States. As an admirer of the German philosopher Friedrich Nietzsche, he was an outspoken opponent of organized religion, theism, censorship, populism, Prohibition, and representative democracy, the last of which he once defined as "the worship of jackals by jackasses". Mencken was a supporter of scientific progress and was critical of osteopathy and chiropractic. He was also an open critic of economics.

Mencken opposed the American entry into World War I and World War II. Some of the opinions in his private diary entries have been described by some researchers as racist and antisemitic, although this characterization has been disputed. Larry S. Gibson argued that Mencken's views on race changed significantly between his early and later private writings which started when he was 50, and that it was more accurate to describe Mencken as elitist rather than racist. He seemed to show a genuine enthusiasm for militarism but never in its American form. "War is a good thing," he wrote, "because it is honest; it admits the central fact of human nature... A nation too long at peace becomes a sort of gigantic old maid."

His longtime home in the Union Square neighborhood of West Baltimore was turned into a city museum, the H. L. Mencken House. His papers were distributed among various city and university libraries, with the largest collection held in the Mencken Room at the central branch of Baltimore's Enoch Pratt Free Library.

== Early life and education ==
Mencken was born in Baltimore, Maryland, on September 12, 1880. He was the son of Anna Margaret (Abhau) and August Mencken Sr., a cigar factory owner. He was of German ancestry and spoke German in his childhood. When Henry was three, his family moved into a new home at 1524 Hollins Street facing Union Square park in the Union Square neighborhood of old West Baltimore. Apart from five years residing elsewhere during the marriage that left him a widower in middle age, Mencken would stay there for the rest of his life.

In his bestselling memoir Happy Days, he described his childhood in Baltimore as "placid, secure, uneventful and happy".

When he was nine years old, he read Mark Twain's Huckleberry Finn, which he later described as "the most stupendous event in my life". He became determined to become a writer and read voraciously. In one winter while in high school he read William Makepeace Thackeray and then "proceeded backward to Addison, Steele, Pope, Swift, Johnson and the other magnificos of the Eighteenth century". He read the entire canon of Shakespeare and became an ardent fan of Rudyard Kipling and Thomas Huxley. As a boy, Mencken also had practical interests, photography and chemistry in particular, and eventually had a home chemistry laboratory in which he performed experiments of his own design, some of them inadvertently dangerous.

He began his primary education in the mid-1880s at Professor Knapp's School on the east side of Holliday Street between East Lexington and Fayette Streets, next to the Holliday Street Theatre and across from the newly constructed Baltimore City Hall. The site today is the War Memorial and City Hall Plaza laid out in 1926 in memory of World War I dead. At 15, in June 1896, he graduated as valedictorian from the Baltimore Polytechnic Institute, at the time a males-only mathematics, technical and science-oriented public high school.

He worked for three years in his father's cigar factory. He disliked the work, especially the sales aspect of it, and resolved to leave, with or without his father's blessing. In early 1898 he took a writing class at the Cosmopolitan University, a free correspondence school established by The Cosmopolitan magazine. This was to be the entirety of Mencken's formal post-secondary education in journalism, or in any other subject. Upon his father's death a few days after Christmas in the same year, the business passed to his uncle, and Mencken was free to pursue his career in journalism. He applied in February 1899 to the Morning Herald newspaper (which became the Baltimore Morning Herald in 1900) and was hired part-time, but still kept his position at the factory for a few months. In June he was hired as a full-time reporter.

== Career ==
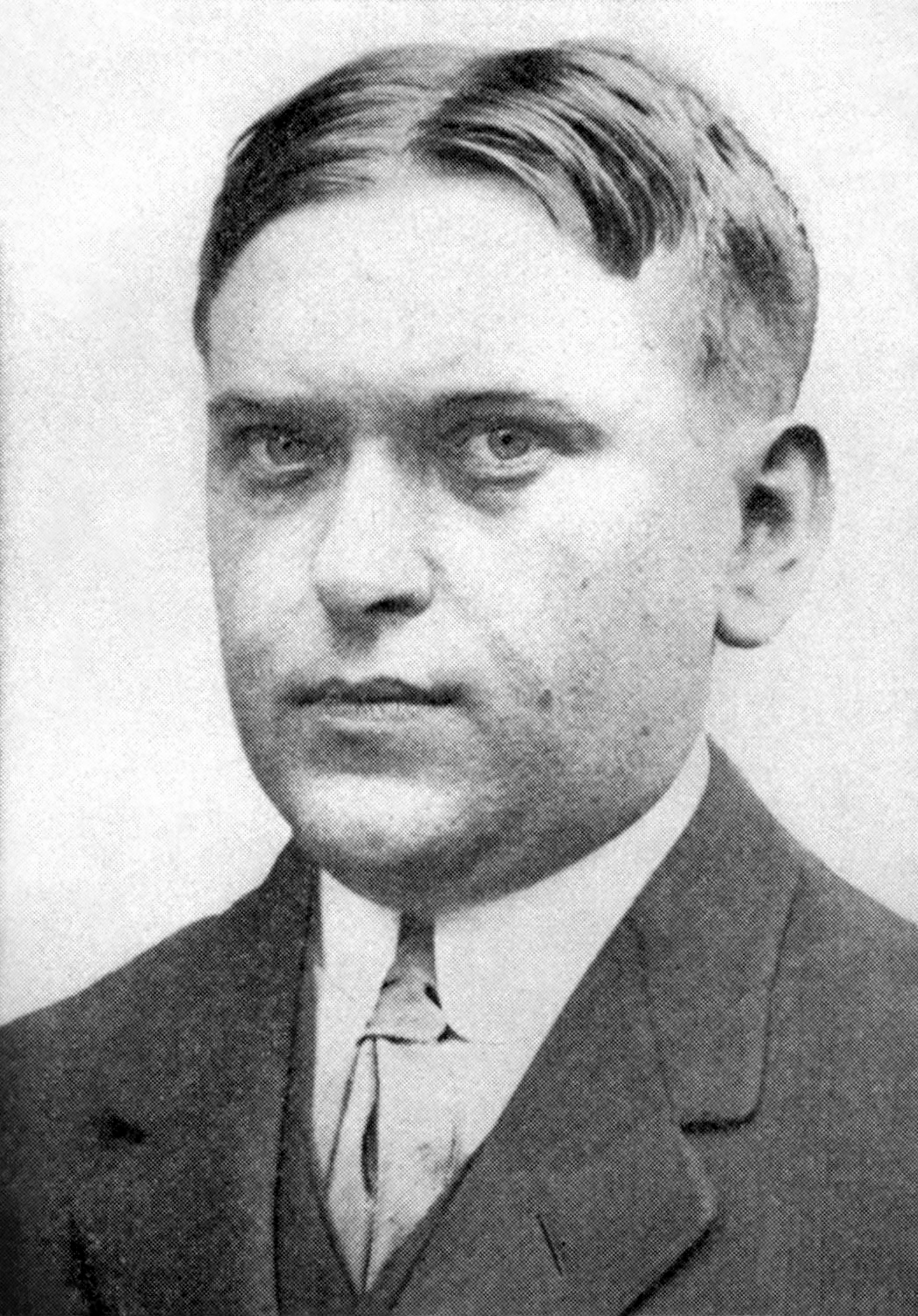
Mencken c. 1920

Mencken served as a reporter at the Herald for six years. Fewer than two-and-a-half years after the Great Baltimore Fire, the paper was purchased in June 1906 by Charles H. Grasty, the owner and editor of The News since 1892 and competing owner and publisher Gen. Felix Agnus, of the town's oldest (since 1773) and largest daily, The Baltimore American. They proceeded to divide the staff, assets and resources of The Herald between them. Mencken then moved to The Baltimore Sun, where he worked for Charles H. Grasty. He continued to contribute to The Sun, The Evening Sun (founded 1910) and The Sunday Sun full-time until 1948, when he stopped writing after suffering a stroke.

Mencken began writing the editorials and opinion pieces that made his name at The Sun. On the side, he wrote short stories, a novel, and even poetry, which he later revealed. In 1908, he became a literary critic for The Smart Set magazine, and in 1924 he and George Jean Nathan founded and edited The American Mercury, published by Alfred A. Knopf. It soon developed a national circulation and became highly influential on college campuses across America. In 1933, Mencken resigned as editor.

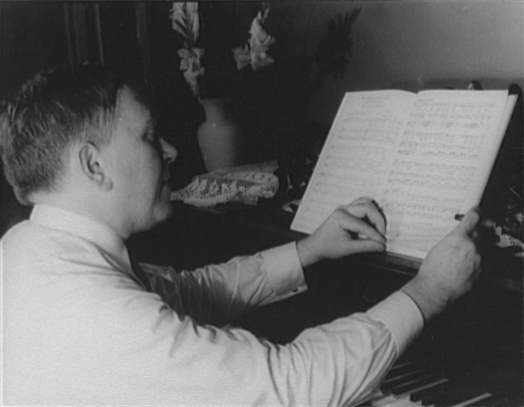
Mencken photographed by Carl Van Vechten, 1932

During the Great Depression, Mencken did not support the New Deal, which cost him popularity. In 1931, the Arkansas legislature passed a motion to pray for Mencken's soul after he had called the state the "apex of moronia". In the mid-1930s, Mencken feared President Franklin D. Roosevelt and his New Deal liberalism as a powerful force. Mencken was "deeply conservative, resentful of change, looking back upon the 'happy days' of a bygone time, wanted no part of the world that the New Deal promised to bring in" according to Charles A. Fecher. Mencken had strong reservations regarding US participation in World War II. He ceased writing for The Baltimore Sun for several years, focusing on his memoirs and other projects as editor while he served as an adviser for the paper that had been his home for nearly his entire career.

In 1948, he briefly returned to the political scene to cover the presidential election in which President Harry S. Truman faced Republican Thomas Dewey and Henry A. Wallace of the Progressive Party. His later work consisted of humorous, anecdotal, and nostalgic essays that were first published in The New Yorker and then collected in the books Happy Days, Newspaper Days, and Heathen Days.

== Personal life ==
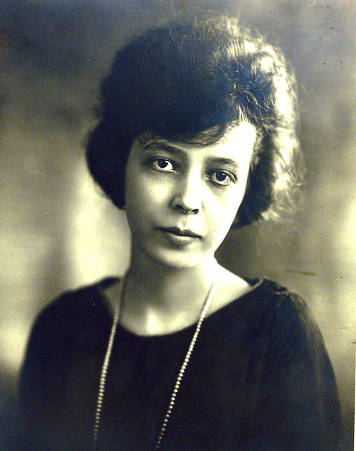
Sara Haardt Mencken

Mencken cultivated a public persona of a contented bachelor, but he did ultimately have long-term relationships with two women. The first was the writer and nurse Marion Bloom, whom he met around 1914. They had an on-and-off romantic relationship for about a decade. Their correspondence (later published) makes clear it was a genuine love affair, though Mencken ultimately did not marry her, which caused her considerable heartbreak.

On August 27, 1930, Mencken married Sara Haardt, a German American professor of English at Goucher College in Baltimore and an author eighteen years his junior. Haardt had led an unsuccessful effort in Alabama to ratify the 19th Amendment supporting women's suffrage. The two met in 1923, after Mencken delivered a lecture at Goucher; a seven-year courtship ensued. The marriage made national headlines, and many were surprised that Mencken, who once called marriage "the end of hope" and who was well known for mocking relations between the sexes, had gone to the altar. "The Holy Spirit informed and inspired me", Mencken said. "Like all other infidels, I am superstitious and always follow hunches: this one seemed to be a superb one." Even more startling, he was marrying an Alabama native, despite his having written scathing essays about the American South. Haardt was in poor health from tuberculosis throughout their marriage and died in 1935 of meningitis, leaving Mencken grief-stricken. He had always championed her writing, and after her death, had a collection of her short stories published under the title Southern Album. Haardt's childhood friend the Alabama author Sara Mayfield wrote extensively about Haardt and Mencken in her 1968 book The Constant Circle: H. L. Mencken and His Friends.

=== Last years ===
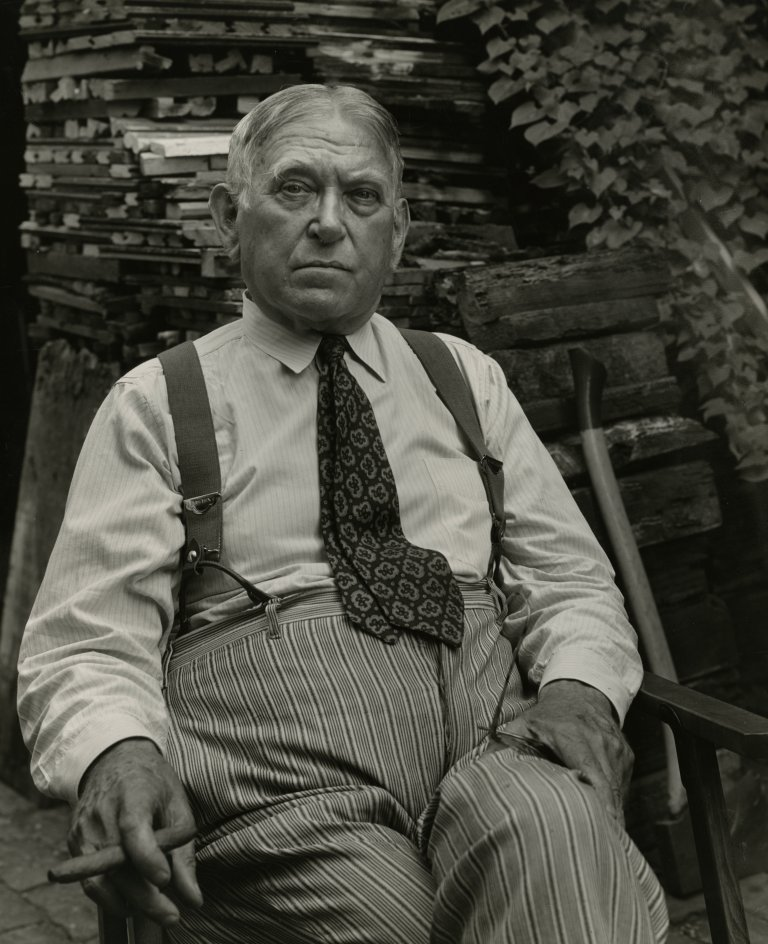
Mencken photographed on his 75th birthday by A. Aubrey Bodine

On November 23, 1948, Mencken suffered a stroke, which left him aware and fully conscious but nearly unable to read or write and able to speak only with difficulty. After his stroke, Mencken enjoyed listening to classical music, and after some recovery of his ability to speak, talking with friends, but he sometimes referred to himself in the past tense, as if he were already dead. During the last year of his life, his friend and biographer William Manchester read to him daily.

=== Death ===
Mencken died in his sleep on January 29, 1956. He was interred in Baltimore's Loudon Park Cemetery. A very small, short, and private service was held, in accordance with Mencken's wishes.

Although it does not appear on his tombstone, Mencken, during his Smart Set days, wrote a joking epitaph for himself:

If, after I depart this vale, you ever remember me and have thought to please my ghost, forgive some sinner and wink your eye at some homely girl.

== Beliefs ==
In his capacity as editor, Mencken became close friends with the leading literary figures of his time, including Theodore Dreiser, F. Scott Fitzgerald, Joseph Hergesheimer, Anita Loos, Ben Hecht, Sinclair Lewis, James Branch Cabell, and Alfred Knopf, as well as a mentor to several young reporters, including Alistair Cooke. He also championed artists whose works he considered worthy. For example, he asserted that books such as Caught Short! A Saga of Wailing Wall Street (1929), by Eddie Cantor (ghostwritten by David Freedman) did more to pull America out of the Great Depression than all government measures combined. He also mentored John Fante. Thomas Hart Benton illustrated an edition of Mencken's book Europe After 8:15.

Mencken also published many works under various pseudonyms, including Owen Hatteras, John H Brownell, William Drayham, WLD Bell, and Charles Angoff. As a ghostwriter for the physician Leonard K. Hirshberg, he wrote a series of articles, and in 1910, most of a book about the care of babies.

Mencken was an outspoken critic of Prohibition. His detestation of the Eighteenth Amendment aligned Mencken with the cultural elite of his time. He led intellectual and emotional campaigns to eradicate Prohibition and went as far to vote for Franklin Roosevelt in 1932 to accomplish this abolition of the Eighteenth Amendment. Mencken viewed the freedom to drink as critical liberty and considered alcohol as one of humanity's greatest inventions.

Mencken admired the German philosopher Friedrich Nietzsche (he was the first writer to provide a scholarly analysis in English of Nietzsche's views and writings) and the Polish writer Joseph Conrad. His humor and satire owed much to Ambrose Bierce and Mark Twain. He did much to defend Theodore Dreiser despite freely admitting his faults, including stating forthrightly that Dreiser often wrote badly and was gullible. Mencken expressed his appreciation for William Graham Sumner in a 1941 collection of Sumner's essays and regretted never having known him. Mencken was scathing in his criticism of the German philosopher Hans Vaihinger, whom Mencken described as "an extremely dull author" and whose famous book Philosophy of 'As If' he dismissed as an unimportant "foot-note to all existing systems".

Mencken recommended for publication philosopher and author Ayn Rand's first novel, We the Living, and called it "a really excellent piece of work". Shortly afterwards, Rand addressed him in correspondence as "the greatest representative of a philosophy" to which she wanted to dedicate her life, "individualism", and later listed him as her favorite columnist.

Mencken is fictionalized in the play Inherit the Wind (a fictionalized version of the Scopes monkey trial of 1925) as the cynical sarcastic atheist E. K. Hornbeck (right), seen here as played by Gene Kelly in the Hollywood film version. On the left is Henry Drummond, based on Clarence Darrow and portrayed by Spencer Tracy.

For Mencken, Adventures of Huckleberry Finn was the finest work of American literature. He particularly relished Mark Twain's depiction of a succession of gullible and ignorant townspeople, "boobs", as Mencken referred to them, who are repeatedly gulled by a pair of colorful con men: the deliberately pathetic "Duke" and "Dauphin", with whom Huck and Jim travel down the Mississippi River. For Mencken, the depiction epitomizes the hilarious dark side of America, where democracy, as defined by Mencken, is "the worship of jackals by jackasses".

Such turns of phrase evoked the erudite cynicism and rapier sharpness of language displayed by Ambrose Bierce in his darkly satiric The Devil's Dictionary. A noted curmudgeon, democratic in subjects attacked, Mencken savaged politics, hypocrisy, and social convention. A master of English, he was given to bombast and once disdained the lowly hot dog bun's descent into "the soggy rolls prevailing today, of ground acorns, plaster of Paris, flecks of bath sponge and atmospheric air all compact".

Defining Puritanism as "the haunting fear that someone, somewhere, may be happy", Mencken believed that the US had not cast aside the Puritans' influence. He opined that American culture, unlike its European counterparts, had not attained intellectual freedom, and judged literature by moral orthodoxy and not by artistic merit. His most outspoken essay was "Puritanism as a Literary Force" from his 1917 collection of essays A Book of Prefaces:

The Puritan's utter lack of aesthetic sense, his distrust of all romantic emotion, his unmatchable intolerance of opposition, his unbreakable belief in his own bleak and narrow views, his savage cruelty of attack, his lust for relentless and barbarous persecution – these things have put an almost unbearable burden up on the exchange of ideas in the United States.

As a nationally syndicated columnist and book author, he commented widely on the social scene, literature, music, prominent politicians and contemporary movements, such as the temperance movement. Mencken was a keen cheerleader of scientific progress, skeptical of economic theories and strongly opposed to osteopathic/chiropractic medicine. He also debunked the idea of objective news reporting since "truth is a commodity that the masses of undifferentiated men cannot be induced to buy" and added a humorous description of how "Homo Boobus", like "higher mammalia", is moved by "whatever gratifies his prevailing yearnings".

As a frank admirer of Nietzsche, Mencken was a detractor of representative democracy, which he believed was a system in which inferior men dominated their superiors. Also, like Nietzsche, Mencken lambasted religious belief and the very concept of God, as he was an unflinching atheist. He was particularly hostile to Christian fundamentalism, Christian Science and creationism, and towards the "Booboisie", his word for the ignorant middle classes. In the summer of 1925 he attended the famous Scopes "Monkey Trial" in Dayton, Tennessee, and wrote scathing columns for the Baltimore Sun (these widely syndicated) and American Mercury mocking the anti-evolution fundamentalists (especially William Jennings Bryan). The play Inherit the Wind is a fictional version of the trial, and as noted above the cynical reporter E.K. Hornbeck is based on Mencken. In 1926, he deliberately had himself arrested for selling an issue of The American Mercury, which was banned in Boston by the Comstock laws. Mencken heaped scorn not only on the public officials he disliked but also on the state of American elective politics.

In the summer of 1926, Mencken followed with great interest the Los Angeles grand jury inquiry into the famous Canadian American evangelist Aimee Semple McPherson. She was accused of faking her reported kidnapping and the case attracted national attention. There was every expectation that Mencken would continue his previous pattern of anti-fundamentalist articles, this time with a searing critique of McPherson. Unexpectedly, he came to her defense by identifying various local religious and civic groups that were using the case as an opportunity to pursue their respective ideological agendas against the embattled Pentecostal minister. He spent several weeks in Hollywood, California, and wrote many scathing and satirical columns on the movie industry and Southern California culture. After all charges had been dropped against McPherson, Mencken revisited the case in 1930 with a sarcastic and observant article. He wrote that since many of that town's residents had acquired their ideas "of the true, the good and the beautiful" from the movies and newspapers, "Los Angeles will remember the testimony against her long after it forgets the testimony that cleared her".

=== Science and mathematics ===
Mencken defended the evolutionary views of Charles Darwin but spoke unfavorably of many prominent physicists and had little regard for pure mathematics. Regarding theoretical physics, he said to longtime editor Charles Angoff, "Imagine measuring infinity! That's a laugh." Elsewhere, he dismissed higher mathematics and probability theory as "nonsense", after he read Angoff's article for Charles Sanders Peirce in the American Mercury: "So you believe in that garbage, too—theories of knowledge, infinity, laws of probability. I can make no sense of it, and I don't believe you can either, and I don't think your god Peirce knew what he was talking about."

Mencken repeatedly identified mathematics with metaphysics and theology. According to Mencken, mathematics is necessarily infected with metaphysics. Mathematicians tend to engage in metaphysical speculation. In a review of Alfred North Whitehead's The Aims of Education, Mencken remarked that, although he agreed with Whitehead's thesis and admired his writing style, "Now and then he falls into mathematical jargon and pollutes his discourse with equations", and "[T]here are moments when he seems to be following some of his mathematical colleagues into the gaudy metaphysics which now entertains them". For Mencken, theology was characterized by it using correct reasoning from false premises. Mencken uses the term "theology" more generally to refer to the use of logic in science or any field of knowledge. In a review of Arthur Eddington's The Nature of the Physical World and Joseph Needham's Man a Machine, Mencken ridiculed the use of reasoning to establish any fact in science.

Mencken wrote a review of Sir James Jeans's book, The Mysterious Universe, in which Mencken wrote that mathematics is not necessary for physics. Instead of mathematical "speculation" (such as quantum theory), Mencken believed physicists should directly look at individual facts in the laboratory, as do chemists.

In the same article, which he re-printed in the Mencken Chrestomathy, Mencken primarily contrasts what real scientists do, which is to simply directly look at the existence of "shapes and forces" confronting them instead of (such as in statistics) attempting to speculate and use mathematical models. Physicists and especially astronomers are consequently not real scientists, because when looking at shapes or forces, they do not simply "patiently wait for further light", but resort to mathematical theory. There is no need for statistics in scientific physics, since one should simply look at the facts while statistics attempts to construct mathematical models. On the other hand, the really competent physicists do not bother with the "theology" or reasoning of mathematical theories (such as in quantum mechanics).

Mencken ridiculed Albert Einstein's theory of general relativity, believing that "in the long run his curved space may be classed with the psychosemantic bumps of Gall and Spurzheim".

=== Race and elitism ===
In addition to his identification of races with castes, Mencken had views about the superior individual within communities. He believed that every community produced a few people of clear superiority. He considered groupings on a par with hierarchies, which led to a kind of natural elitism and natural aristocracy. "Superior" individuals, in Mencken's view, were those wrongly oppressed and disdained by their own communities but nevertheless distinguished by their will and personal achievement, not by race or birth.

External videos
- Booknotes interview with Charles Fecher on The Diary of H. L. Mencken, January 28, 1990, C-SPAN

In 1989, following his instructions, Alfred A. Knopf published Mencken's "secret diary" as The Diary of H. L. Mencken. According to an Associated Press story, Mencken's views shocked even the "sympathetic scholar who edited it", Charles Fecher of Baltimore. A club in Baltimore, the Maryland Club, had one Jewish member. When that member died, Mencken said, "There is no other Jew in Baltimore who seems suitable." The diary also quoted him as saying of his black maid, in September 1943, that "it is impossible to talk anything resembling discretion or judgment to a colored woman. They are all essentially child-like, and even hard experience does not teach them anything".

Mencken opposed lynching. In 1935, he testified before Congress in support of the Costigan–Wagner Bill. While he had previously written negatively about lynchings during the 1910s and 1920s, the lynchings of Matthew Williams and George Armwood caused him to write in support of the bill and give political advice to Walter White on how to maximize the likelihood of the bill's passing. The two lynchings in his home state made the issue directly relevant to him. His arguments against lynching were influenced by his interpretation of civilization, as he believed that a civilized society would not tolerate it.

One of his biographers observed that:

... he was receptive to black writers, without question more helpful than any other editor of his time. Both W.E.B. Du Bois and the poet Countee Cullen appeared in the Mercury's pages during its first year, and in later issues poets James Weldon Johnson and Langston Hughes and future NAACP head Walter F. White were represented. The black journalist George Schuyler, who contributed nine essays to the Mercury, was to appear more frequently in the magazine in the final six years of Mencken's editorship than any other writer.

— Fred Hobson

External videos
- Presentation by Terry Teachout on The Skeptic, November 11, 2002, C-SPAN

In a review of The Skeptic: A Life of H. L. Mencken, by Terry Teachout, journalist Christopher Hitchens described Mencken as a German nationalist, "an antihumanist as much as an atheist", who was "prone to the hyperbole and sensationalism he distrusted in others". Hitchens also criticized Mencken for writing a scathing critique of Franklin Delano Roosevelt but nothing equally negative of Adolf Hitler.

Larry S. Gibson argued that Mencken's views on race changed significantly between his early and later writings, attributing some of the changes in Mencken's views to his experience of being treated as an outsider due to his German heritage during World War I. Gibson speculated that much of Mencken's language was intended to lure in readers by suggesting a shared negative view of other races, and then writing about their positive aspects. Describing Mencken as elitist rather than racist, he says Mencken ultimately believed that humans consisted of a small group of those of superior intelligence and a mass of inferior people, regardless of race.

Mencken scholar Marion Elizabeth Rodgers has argued that, despite the racial slurs and ethnic slang in the diaries, Mencken rebelled against "the Aryan imbecilities of Hitler" and stated: "To me personally, race prejudice is one of the most preposterous of all the imbecilities of mankind. There are so few people on earth worth knowing that I hate to think of any man I like as a German or a Frenchman, a gentile or a Jew, Negro or a white man."

==== Anglo-Saxons ====
Mencken countered the arguments for Anglo-Saxon superiority prevalent in his time in a 1923 essay entitled "The Anglo-Saxon", which argued that if there was such a thing as a pure "Anglo-Saxon" race, it was defined by its inferiority and cowardice: "The normal American of the 'pure-blooded' majority goes to rest every night with an uneasy feeling that there is a burglar under the bed and he gets up every morning with a sickening fear that his underwear has been stolen."

==== Jews ====
Chaz Bufe, an admirer of Mencken, wrote that Mencken's various antisemitic statements should be understood in the context that Mencken made bombastic and over-the-top denunciations of almost any national, religious, and ethnic group. One of his biographers noted:

Thus, rhetorically at least, he lived life more dramatically than most other mortals, attempted more, risked more, said more, and said it more colorfully on a wider range of subjects than perhaps any other writer of his generation. The result, depending on what he came out with at any given time, was that he appeared to be both the best friend and the worst enemy of Jews, blacks, and numerous other segments of the population. The truth is that a hundred statements could be chosen to "prove" Mencken anti-Semitic and a hundred to "prove" he was not.

— Fred Hobson

That said, Bufe still wrote that some of Mencken's statements were "odious", such as his claim in his 1918 introduction to Nietzsche's The Anti-Christ that "The case against the Jews is long and damning; it would justify ten thousand times as many pogroms as now go on in the world". Mencken was also an Axis sympathizer who berated the Allied war effort as late as 1944.

Historian David T. Beito points out that Mencken often showed greater sensitivity toward the suffering of Jews than most other leading figures during the period, including Franklin D. Roosevelt. In January 1939 Mencken proposed immediate admission to the U.S. of all the German Jews. There was "no reason whatsoever for believing it would be impossible to absorb them, or even difficult." Mencken pointed out that "Almost as many Jews as that came into the United States during every year from 1903 to 1914, and yet the republic somehow survived." He considered it unfair to expect American Jews to carry the funding burden because it would only make them targets of the "Ku Kluxers". He challenged the "so-called Christians ... who are now so free with weasel words of comfort and flattery, and so curiously stingy with practical aid" to take financial responsibility.

== Memorials ==
=== Home ===
Mencken's home at 1524 Hollins Street in Baltimore's Union Square neighborhood, where he lived for 67 years, was bequeathed to the University of Maryland, Baltimore on the death of his younger brother, August, in 1967. The City of Baltimore acquired the property in 1983, and the H. L. Mencken House became part of the City Life Museums. The house was restored in 2019, with the third floor and rear of the second floor becoming the headquarters of the Baltimore National Heritage Area. The first floor and front of the second floor appear much as they were in the 1940s, and constitute the H. L. Mencken House Museum, overseen by the nonprofit Society to Preserve H. L. Mencken's Legacy. It is opened for special events, and individual and group visits are available by arrangement.

=== Papers ===
Shortly after World War II, Mencken expressed his intention of bequeathing his books and papers to Baltimore's Enoch Pratt Free Library. At his death, it was in possession of most of the present large collection. As a result, his papers as well as much of his personal library, which includes many books inscribed by major authors, are held in the Library's Central Branch on Cathedral Street in Baltimore. The original third floor H. L. Mencken Room and Collection housing this collection was dedicated on April 17, 1956. The new Mencken Room, on the first floor of the Library's Annex, was opened in November 2003.

The collection contains Mencken's typescripts, newspaper and magazine contributions, published books, family documents and memorabilia, clipping books, large collection of presentation volumes, file of correspondence with prominent Marylanders, and the extensive material he collected while he was preparing The American Language.

Other Mencken related collections of note are at Dartmouth College, Harvard University, Princeton University, Johns Hopkins University, and Yale University. In 2007, Johns Hopkins acquired "nearly 6,000 books, photographs and letters by and about Mencken" from "the estate of an Ohio accountant".

The Sara Haardt Mencken collection at Goucher College includes letters exchanged between Haardt and Mencken and condolences written after her death. Some of Mencken's vast literary correspondence is held at the New York Public Library. "Gift of HL Mencken 1929" is stamped on The Marriage of Heaven and Hell, Luce 1906 edition of William Blake, which shows up from the Library of Congress online version for reading. Mencken's letters to Louise (Lou) Wylie, a reporter and feature writer for New Orleans's The Times-Picayune newspaper, are archived at Loyola University New Orleans.

== Works ==
=== Books ===
- George Bernard Shaw: His Plays (1905)
- The Philosophy of Friedrich Nietzsche (1908)
- The Gist of Nietzsche (1910)
- What You Ought to Know about your Baby (Ghostwriter for Leonard K. Hirshberg; 1910)
- Men versus the Man: a Correspondence between Robert Rives La Monte, Socialist and H. L. Mencken, Individualist (1910)
- Europe After 8:15 (1914)
- A Book of Burlesques (1916)
- A Little Book in C Major (1916)
- A Book of Prefaces (1917)
- In Defense of Women (1918)
- Damn! A Book of Calumny (1918)
- The American Language (1919)
- Prejudices (1919–27)
  - First Series (1919)
  - Second Series (1920)
  - Third Series (1922)
  - Fourth Series (1924)
  - Fifth Series (1926)
  - Sixth Series (1927)
  - Selected Prejudices (1927)
- Heliogabalus (A Buffoonery in Three Acts) (1920)
- The American Credo (1920)
- Notes on Democracy (1926)
- Menckeneana: A Schimpflexikon (1928) – Editor
- Treatise on the Gods (1930)
- Making a President (1932)
- Treatise on Right and Wrong (1934)
- Happy Days, 1880–1892 (1940)
- Newspaper Days, 1899–1906 (1941)
- A New Dictionary of Quotations on Historical Principles from Ancient and Modern Sources (1942)
- Heathen Days, 1890–1936 (1943)
- Christmas Story (1944)
- The American Language, Supplement I (1945)
- The American Language, Supplement II (1948)
- A Mencken Chrestomathy (1949) (edited by H. L. Mencken)

Posthumous collections

- Minority Report (1956)
- On Politics: A Carnival of Buncombe (1956)
- Cairns, Huntington, ed. (1965), The American Scene.
- The Bathtub Hoax and Other Blasts and Bravos from the Chicago Tribune (1958)
- Lippman, Theo Jr, ed. (1975), A Gang of Pecksniffs: And Other Comments on Newspaper Publishers, Editors and Reporters.
- Rodgers, Marion Elizabeth, ed. (1991), The Impossible H. L. Mencken: A Selection of His Best Newspaper Stories.
- Yardley, Jonathan, ed. (1992), My Life As Author and Editor.
- A Second Mencken Chrestomathy (1994) (edited by Terry Teachout)
- Thirty-five Years of Newspaper Work (1996)
- A Religious Orgy in Tennessee: A Reporter's Account of the Scopes Monkey Trial, Melville House Publishing, 2006.

=== Chapbooks, pamphlets, and notable essays ===
- Ventures into Verse (1903)
- The Artist: A Drama Without Words (1912)
- The Creed of a Novelist (1916)
- Pistols for Two (1917)
- The Sahara of the Bozart (1920)
- Gamalielese (1921)
- "The Hills of Zion" (1925)
- The Libido for the Ugly (1927)
- The Penalty of Death

=== Translations (excerpt) ===
- Friedrich Nietzsche: The Antichrist – Translated and Introduced by H. L. Mencken, Alfred A. Knopf, New York 1918 (Project Gutenberg EBook of The Antichrist)

== See also ==
- Bathtub hoax
- Elmer Gantry, a 1927 satirical novel dedicated to Mencken by Sinclair Lewis
- History of the Germans in Baltimore
- Maryland literature
- Peabody Bookshop and Beer Stube
