= Larry S. Gibson =

American lawyer and organizer (born 1942)

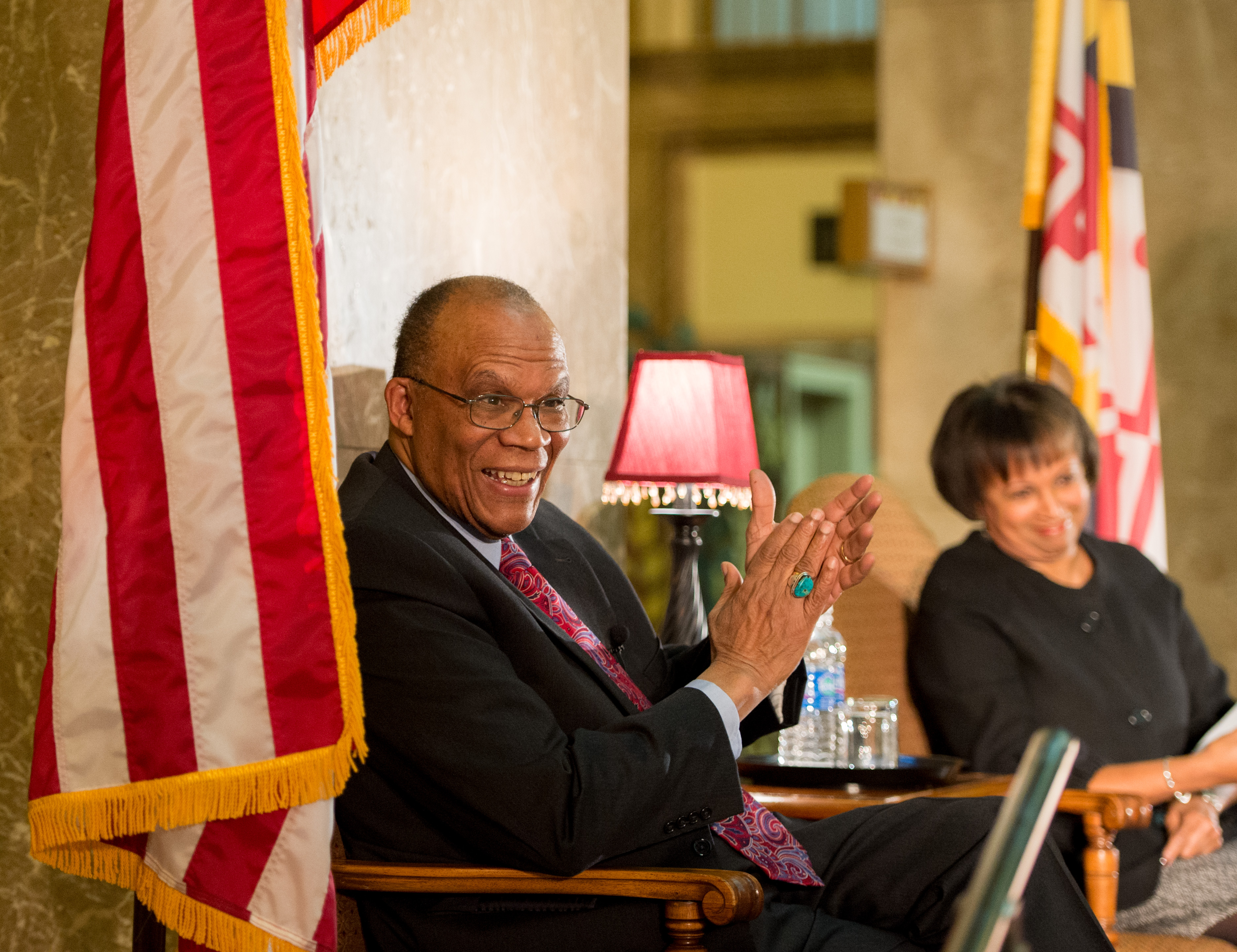
- Born: March 22, 1942; Washington, D.C.
- Education: Howard University, Columbia University
- Occupations: Writer, lawyer
- Employers: University of Maryland Francis King Carey School of Law; University of Virginia School of Law
- Website: larrysgibson.com

Larry S. Gibson (born March 22, 1942) is a law professor, lawyer, political organizer, and historian. He currently serves as a professor at the Francis King Carey School of Law in the University of Maryland, Baltimore; where he has been on the faculty for 50 years. Gibson serves as counsel the firm of Shapiro, Sher, and Sandler. He was the principal advocate for the legislation that renamed Maryland's major airport, the Baltimore Washington International Thurgood Marshall Airport and published Young Thurgood: The Making of a Supreme Court Justice in 2012.

== Early life ==
Gibson was born on March 22, 1942, in Washington, D.C.; his father worked as a janitor while his mother worked as a domestic worker and cook. The family would later move to Baltimore, where Gibson earned his high school diploma from Baltimore City College in 1960, where he was the first African American class officer. Gibson graduated from Howard University in 1964, where he served as student body president and was a member of Kappa Alpha Psi fraternity. He went on to attend Columbia University in New York, earning his law degree in 1967.

== Career ==
From 1968 until 1971, Gibson worked as an associate for Brown, Allen, Dorsey and Josey. Upon completion of his law degree, Gibson became the first African American to clerk for a federal judge in Maryland. By 1970, Gibson had become a partner at Brown, Allen, Dorsey, and Josey, the next year, he handled the first high profile case of his career representing a Black Panther Party member in a murder case. In 1971, Gibson filed a motion to try Charles Wyche separately from a group of Black Panther Party members accused of the kidnap and murder of Eugene Anderson. With Gibson's argument and evidence presentation establishing an alibi, the jury acquitted Wyche of all charges. In 1972, he became the first African American law professor at the University of Virginia. Two years later, he accepted a faculty position at the University of Maryland School of Law, where he continues to teach classes on Evidence, Civil procedure, Race and the Law, Election Law, and a Thurgood Marshall Seminar. From 1973 to 1977, Gibson served on the faculty of the American Academy of Judicial Education. Throughout the 1980s, he served as a reporter to the Maryland Court of Appeals Standing Committee on Rules of Practice and Procedure and was involved in the reorganization of the Maryland Rules of Procedure. On November 14, 2019, Larry S. Gibson was named the Morton and Sophia Macht Professor of Law at University of Maryland, Baltimore. Gibson has also taught at the University of Mississippi and the University of Aberdeen in Scotland.

After meeting Thurgood Marshall in 1975, Gibson began collecting information on him, which led to the publication of his 2012 book, Young Thurgood: The Making of a Supreme Court Justice. He is currently working on his second book on Marshall which will chronicle Marshall's first career from 1935 to 1955

== Political organizing ==
Gibson's political activism began in 1968, with organization of Joseph Howard's campaign for Judge on the Supreme Bench of Baltimore City. He went on to work on the local campaigns of Milton Allen for State's Attorney, William H. Murphy for judge, Paul Chester for Court Clerk, and Wayne Curry for County Executive. Milton Allen was elected as Baltimore's first African American state's attorney. Gibson also campaign manager for the Honorable Kurt L. Schmoke for his successful elections in 1987, 1991, and 1995. Schmoke was the first elected African American mayor of the City of Baltimore.

Under President Jimmy Carter, Gibson served as Associate Deputy Attorney General of the United States. He served as vice chairman of the National Security Council Working Group on Terrorism and was Director of the National Economic Crimes Project. In 1992, Gibson served as the Maryland State chairman for the Clinton/Gore presidential Campaign. In the 2000s, Gibson started serving as a campaign consultant and political advisor to African political leaders including President Ellen Johnson Sirleaf of Liberia and former President of Madagascar, Marc Ravalomanana.

In 2005, Larry Gibson worked with U.S. Representative Elijah Cummings to appeal to the Maryland State Legislature to rename Baltimore-Washington International Airport after Thurgood Marshall. House Bill 189 was passed by the Maryland General Assembly later that year.

== Awards and memberships ==
For ten years, Gibson served on the committee of the National Board of Law Examiners which develops the evidence section of the Multi-State Bar Examination. In 2003, Gibson founded and continues to organize the Black Law Alumni Reunion and Symposium for Carey School of Law at University of Maryland. That same year, the Larry S. Gibson Fellowship Endowment was created with intention of fully endowing the Larry S. Gibson Professorship at Maryland Carey Law. Gibson has received honorary doctorate degrees from Morgan State University, Coppin State University, and Sojourner Douglas College,

In 2018, Gibson received the University of Maryland, Baltimore Diversity Recognition Award as Outstanding UMB Faculty for his organization of the Black Law Alumni Reunion and Symposium for that year. In 2019, the Baltimore Sun announced Gibson as a Business and Civic Hall of Fame honoree. That same year, Gibson was awarded the Outstanding Faculty Award for the second time during UMB's Dr. Martin Luther King Jr. and Black History Month celebration.

Gibson has served on the board of trustees of the Maryland Historical Trust and the Baltimore City Commission for Historical and Architectural Preservation. He was Chairman of the Commission to Coordinate the Study, Commemoration and Impact of the History and Legacy of Slavery in Maryland.
