= Sara Haardt =

American writer

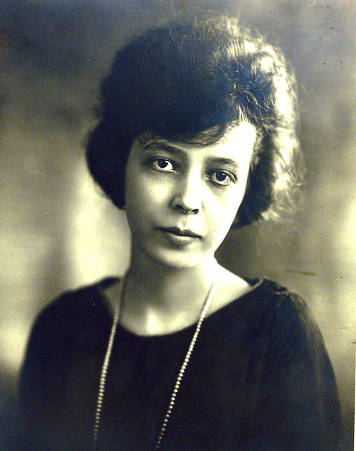
- Born: Sara Powell Haardt; March 1, 1898; Montgomery, Alabama, US
- Died: May 31, 1935 (aged 37); Baltimore, Maryland, US
- Education: Goucher College
- Occupations: Novelist; professor; writer
- Spouse: H. L. Mencken (m. 1930)

Sara Powell Haardt (March 1, 1898 – May 31, 1935) was an American author and professor of English literature. Though she died at the age of 37 of meningitis, she produced a considerable body of work including newspaper reviews, articles, essays, the novel The Making of a Lady, several screenplays and over 50 short stories. She is central to John Barton Wolgamot's notorious book-length poem, In Sara Mencken, Christ and Beethoven There Were Men and Women (1944), recorded by the composer Robert Ashley.

== Early life and education ==
Sara Powell Haardt was born on March 1, 1898, to Venetia (Hall) Haardt and John Anton Haardt in Montgomery, Alabama. She had German American ancestry on her father's side and was the eldest of five children. Haardt attended the Margaret Booth School. In 1920, she graduated Phi Beta Kappa from Goucher College in Baltimore, Maryland. While still an undergraduate at Goucher, she had become a professional writer, writing for literary reviews and popular periodicals.

== Career ==
Haardt was immediately hired to teach at Goucher College in the English Department upon graduation.

She became the head of the Alabama branch of the National Woman's Party, where she led the unsuccessful fight to have the Alabama legislature ratify the 19th Amendment.

Haardt's childhood friend, Alabama author Sara Mayfield wrote extensively about Haardt's marriage to H. L. Mencken in her 1968 book The Constant Circle: H.L. Mencken and His Friends. Despite Mencken's reputation for being "a rock-ribbed bachelor" and his criticism of suffragettes, they married in a small Episcopal ceremony in Baltimore on August 27, 1930.

== Death ==
Haardt died in 1935 from meningitis. Her death was the result of complications of tuberculosis, from which she had suffered for many years.

== Recognition ==
Haardt's short story "Absolutely Perfect" won her a nomination for the O. Henry Prize in 1933.

== Sources ==
- Henley, Ann (1999). Southern Souvenirs: Short Stories and Essays by Sara Haardt. Tuscaloosa: University of Alabama Press.
- Henley, Ann (1994). "Sara Haardt and 'the Sweet, Flowering South". Alabama Heritage (34): 1–21.
- Henley, Ann (2006). "The Flower of the Sahara". Menckeniana: A Quarterly Review (Spring).
- Hobson, Fred (1994). Mencken: A Biography. New York: Random House. ISBN 9780394563299.

- "Review of Mencken: A Biography by Fred Hobson". Publishers Weekly. May 2, 1994.
- "Review of Mencken: A Biography by Fred Hobson". Kirkus Reviews. April 1, 1994.

- Mayfield, Sara (1968). The Constant Circle: H. L. Mencken and His Friends. New York: Delacorte P.
- Mencken, H. L. (1936). Southern Album. Garden City, NY: Doubleday, Doran & Company.
- Rodgers, Marion Elizabeth (1987). Mencken and Sara: A Life in Letters. New York: McGraw-Hill.

- "Review: Mencken and Sara: A Life in Letters edited by Marion Elizabeth Rodgers". Kirkus Reviews. January 19, 1986.
