= Carl Bode =

Educator, diplomat, writer

Carl Bode (March 14, 1911 – January 5, 1993) was an author, poet, professor of English and American Studies at the University of Maryland, and officer of several literary and cultural organizations. He wrote and edited over 30 books, including The American Lyceum, Antebellum Culture, Mencken, the first full biography to be published after H.L. Mencken's death, as well as Maryland, a 350-year history of the state. Bode edited The Collective Poems of Henry Thoreau, The Best of Thoreau's Journals, and The Portable Emerson among others.

He was the founder of the American Studies Association and the Mencken Society, and was president of the Popular Culture Association and the Thoreau Society of America. He was awarded fellowships both by the Guggenheim and Ford Foundations and was named a Fellow of the Royal Society of Literature while serving as cultural attaché at the American Embassy in London. He also taught at the University of Maryland for 40 years.

== List of published works ==
=== Edited works ===
- Collected Poems of Henry Thoreau (1943)
- The Best of Thoreau’s Journals
- co-edited The Correspondence of Henry David Thoreau
- The Portable Emerson (1981), in collaboration with Malcolm Cowley
- The Editor, the Bluenose, and the Prostitute: H.L. Mencken's History of the "Hatrack" Censorship Case. Niwot, Colorado: Roberts, Rinehart, Inc. 1988.

=== Poetry, biographies, and other written works ===
- The American Lyceum
- Antebellum Culture
- Mencken (1969)
- Maryland: A Bicentennial History (1978)
- The Anatomy of American Popular Culture (1983)
- The Sacred Seasons (1975)
- Practical Magic (1981)
- The Man Behind You
