= American Mercury (newspaper) =

Historical newspaper

- Type: Weekly newspaper
- Format: Broadsheet
- Publisher: Joel Barlow and Elisha Babcock
- Editor: Elisha Babcock
- Founded: July 12, 1784
- Ceased publication: June 25, 1833

The American Mercury is a historical newspaper that was published in Hartford, Connecticut, in the early years of the American Republic. The paper was founded by Elisha Babcock (1753–1821) and Joel Barlow (1754–1812) and was "the leading Democratic paper in the state", propounding Jeffersonian liberalism. The paper was succeeded by the Independent Press.
