= August Mencken Sr. =

American businessman (1854–1899)

August Mencken Sr. (1854–1899) was an American cigar magnate who founded Aug. Mencken & Bro. in 1873 with a starting capital of $23 of his own money and $21 of his brother's. A member of Baltimore's German-American community, Mencken was a high-tariff Republican who ran a nonunion factory, viewed the eight-hour day as a foreign innovation destined to destroy America, and drank rye whiskey before every meal, including breakfast.

In about 1889, the Baltimore local Cigar Makers' International Union called a strike. The union did not have the funds to pay full benefits to members; the best it could manage was the $2.10 cost of a ticket to Philadelphia, which had so many cigar shops it was known as the Cigarmaker's Heaven. The only proof that it required of a candidate's profession were the tools of the trade: a boxwood cutting-board and cutting tools. The anti-union Mencken acquired a large quantity of the tools, rounded up a large number of drunks and tramps, gave them a shot of whiskey and a set of the tools, and sent them to Union headquarters for their tickets. In the course of a few weeks, according to Mencken himself, "at least a thousand poor bums were run through the mill." The union went broke and was effectively destroyed, and the strike was broken.

In 1879, August married the German-American Anna Margaret Abhau (1858–1925). Their first child, Henry Louis "H. L." Mencken, was born there in Baltimore in 1880 and their second, August Mencken Jr., was born in 1889.

== See also ==
- History of the Germans in Baltimore, Maryland
