= August Mencken Jr. =

American civil engineer and author (1889–1967)

- Born: February 18, 1889
- Died: May 19, 1967 (aged 78)
- Known for: Civil engineer, author
- Notable work: The Railroad Passenger Car; An Illustrated History of the First Hundred Years
- Father: August Mencken Sr.
- Relatives: Henry Louis Mencken (brother)

August Mencken (February 18, 1889 – May 19, 1967) was an American civil engineer and author. He was the younger brother of Henry Louis Mencken and the son of cigar magnate August Mencken Sr.
