= The Portal (community center) =

Community center for LGBT African Americans in Baltimore, Maryland

Coordinates: 39.317848°N 76.608953°W

- Founded: 2001
- Founder: Rickie Green
- Type: LGBT Community Center
- Location(s): 2419 Greenmount Avenue Suites 1 and 4, Baltimore, Maryland, United States
- Region served: Baltimore and Central Maryland

The Portal was a Baltimore LGBT community center for LGBT African Americans in the Baltimore, Maryland metropolitan area. It was owned and maintained by Empowering New Concepts, Inc. ENC, Inc. is a non-profit, 501(c)(3) community based organization established in 2001 by current CEO Rickie Green. Intended as a safe place for LGBT people of color, they offered health and safety information including AIDS awareness. The Portal "promotes stronger, more effective same gender loving communities of color through access to quality healthcare and economic and educational services." They served men who have sex with men as well as women who have sex with women.

== History ==
It was first opened on August 19, 2002, at 302 Park Avenue, 1st floor, and was reopened on September 16, 2004 at 16 South Calvert Street, in the heart of the Financial District, and again on September 1, 2005, at its current location at 2419 Greenmount Avenue Suites 1 and 4.

In 2005 they participated in the amicus brief supporting "Right to Same Sex Marriage in Maryland" In October 2005 they were awarded a 2006 Annie E. Casey Foundation Families and Children Grant for their direct services program YBU (Why Be You), a "group level intervention for gay, lesbian, bisexual, and transgender youth, designed to address homophobia in the schoolsystem".

In 2007 they presented "Confronting internalized oppression as a barrier to self-care among Black MSM: The RISE intervention" as part of the 138th Annual Meeting & Exposition of the American Public Health Association.

In 2008 they presented "Building On Our Strengths" at the Black Gay Men/MSM and HIV/AIDS: Confronting the Crisis and Planning for Action technical conference convened by The National Alliance of State and Territorial AIDS Directors (NASTAD).

In 2009 they organized a HIV Public Forum to coincide with World AIDS Day. They were also selected as a "funded local partner organization" by the NIAID HIV Vaccine Research Education Initiative.

In May 2010, in conjunction with World AIDS Vaccine Day, they presented AESTHETICS: Perception... (& the Eye of the Beholder), theatre, spoken word, music, and dance performances at Maryland Institute College of Art. This was their third year in a row doing so.

== See also ==
- African-American culture and sexual orientation
