= History of Caribbean Americans in Baltimore =

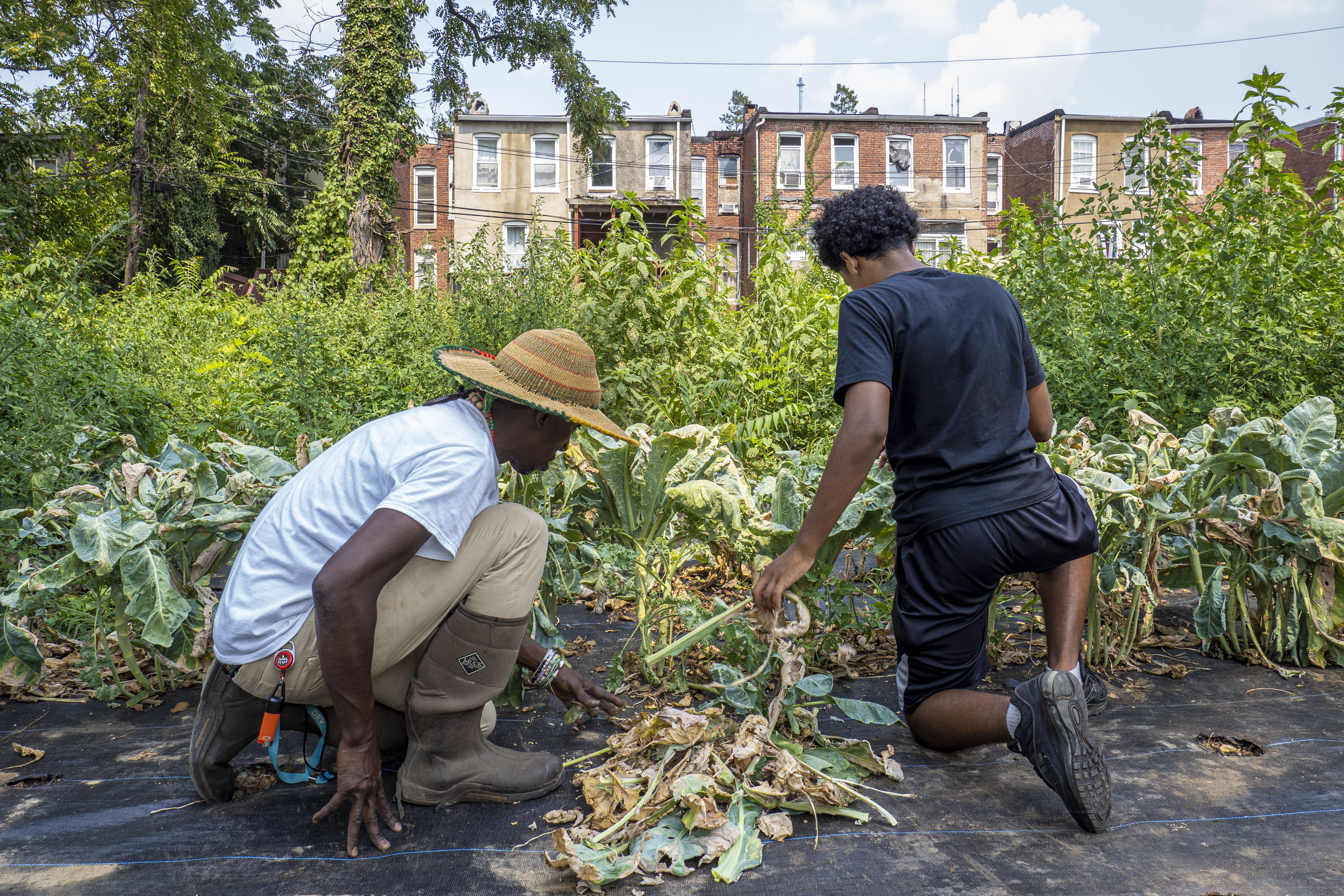
The University of Maryland Extension Urban Farmer Field School holds a 2021 event at Plantation Park Heights Urban Farm, which was created by a group of Caribbean Americans to develop urban farming.

The city of Baltimore, Maryland includes a large and growing Caribbean-American population. The Caribbean-American community is centered in West Baltimore. The largest non-Hispanic Caribbean populations in Baltimore are Jamaicans, Trinidadians and Tobagonians, and Haitians. Baltimore also has significant Hispanic populations from the Spanish West Indies, particularly Puerto Ricans, Dominicans, and Cubans. Northwest Baltimore is the center of the West Indian population of Baltimore, while Caribbean Hispanics in the city tend to live among other Latinos in neighborhoods such as Greektown, Upper Fell's Point, and Highlandtown. Jamaicans and Trinidadians are the first and second largest West Indian groups in the city, respectively. The neighborhoods of Park Heights and Pimlico in northwest Baltimore are home to large West Indian populations, particularly Jamaican-Americans.

== Demographics ==
In the 1960 United States census, Baltimore was home to 429 Puerto Ricans.

There were 17,141 West Indian Americans in the Baltimore metropolitan area in 2000. This count excludes Caribbean people from Hispanic countries, such as Puerto Rico, the Dominican Republic, and Cuba, however, if included the Caribbean population would be about 23,000. In the same year Baltimore's West Indian population was 6,597, 1% of the city's population.

In 2000, Jamaicans were the largest West Indian group in Baltimore making up 1% of the city's population.

In 2010, Puerto Ricans were 0.6% of Baltimore's population with 3,137 people. 0.2% were Dominican at 1,111 people, while 0.1% were Cuban at 824 people.

In 1994, there were 30,000 West Indians in the Greater Baltimore area.

In 2011, immigrants from the West Indies, not otherwise specified, were the sixty-eighth largest foreign-born population in Baltimore. (Several specific West Indian countries of birth were listed separately.) Jamaican immigrants were the second largest foreign-born population in Baltimore, after Mexicans. Trinidadian and Tobagonian immigrants were the third largest, Guyanese immigrants were the twenty-first largest and Haitian immigrants were the thirty-seventh largest.

== History ==
Caribbean immigrants have lived in Baltimore since colonial times. During the time of the French Revolution, there was a slave revolt on the French colony of Saint-Domingue, in what is now Haiti. Many French-speaking Black Catholic and white French Catholic refugees from San Domingo left for Baltimore. In total, 1,500 Franco-Haitians fled the island. The Haitian refugee population was multiracial and included white French-Haitians and their Afro-Haitian slaves, as well as many free people of color, some of whom were also slaveowners. Along with the Sulpician Fathers, these refugees founded St. Francis Xavier Church. The church is the oldest historically Black Catholic church in the United States. During the Haitian Revolution, Baltimore passed an ordinance declaring that all slaves imported from the West Indies, including Haiti, were "dangerous to the peace and welfare of the city" and ordered slave-owners to banish them.

The first Caribbean Hispanics began to arrive in Baltimore during the 1960s. Beginning in the 1960s, middle-class anti-Castro professionals began immigrating to Baltimore from Cuba. They were soon followed by middle-class immigrants from Puerto Rico. 1980 saw a second wave of Cuban immigration. Most were outcasts from Cuba, mainly poor and uneducated and many being former prisoners.

Many Jamaicans have settled in the Park Heights neighborhood. The northern portion of the neighborhood is predominantly white and Jewish and the lower portion is predominantly African-American. The Jamaicans, the majority of whom are Black, have mostly settled in the lower portion of the neighborhood with other people of African descent.

Caribbean Hispanics in Baltimore, particularly Puerto Ricans and Dominicans, some of whom come from other states like New York and New Jersey, are mostly concentrated in outer Southeast neighborhoods east of Haven Street towards southeastern Baltimore County, including Greektown and Joseph Lee.

== Culture ==
An annual Baltimore Caribbean Carnival Festival is held in Druid Hill Park. The festival attracts around 20–25,000 people and includes food, music, and a parade. The event has been held since 1981 when it was formed by the West Indian Association of Maryland, an organization for people of West Indian or Guyanese descent.

By proclamation of Baltimore Mayor Kurt L. Schmoke, September 10–12 have been designated as "West Indian/Caribbean Days".

Trinidadian-Americans have established the Trinidad and Tobago Association of Baltimore and multiple Trinidadian businesses, including barbershops, groceries, and specialty stores. A newspaper called Caribbean Focus exists which caters to the community. Every year a festival is held to celebrate the culture of Trinidad and Tobago.

The Baltimore-based Komite Ayiti (Haitian Creole for “Haiti Committee”) is a Haitian-American organization with around 200 members in Maryland. Komite Ayiti hosts monthly get-togethers where members can learn to speak Haitian Creole and can express their Haitian culture, including Haitian dance and cuisine. The committee was opposed to and joined in demonstrations against the Trump administration's decision to cancel temporary protected status for nearly 60,000 Haitians living in the United States. The committee also celebrates an annual Haitian Independence Day event where traditional dishes such as soup joumou are served.

== See also ==
- History of the African Americans in Baltimore
- History of the Hispanics and Latinos in Baltimore
- West Indian Americans
