= Joseph Lee, Baltimore =

Coordinates: 39°17′20.6″N 76°32′30.0″W

Joseph Lee
- Neighborhood of Baltimore
- Interactive map of Joseph Lee
- Country: United States
- State: Maryland
- City: Baltimore
- Neighborhood: Bayview or Hopkins Bayview
- Established: 1920s

Area
  - Total: 65 acres (26 ha)

Population (2000)
  - Total: 2,175
- Hospitals: Johns Hopkins Bayview Medical Center

Joseph Lee, the residential part of Bayview, is a neighborhood in Baltimore, Maryland, United States. Part of the larger Bayview or Hopkins Bayview neighborhood, it borders the Greektown neighborhood. It is sometimes called the "A to K" or "ABC neighborhood" because its north–south streets are arranged in alphabetical order: Anglesea, Bonsal, Cornwall, Drew, Elrino, Folcroft, Gusryan, Hornel, Imla, Joplin, and Kane.

Most of the homes in the community are traditional Baltimore row homes. The earliest houses, built in the 1920s, are in the western portion of the neighborhood and generally have three bedrooms. The houses in the eastern portion, built in the 1950s, typically have two bedrooms. Some have formstone fronts made popular in the 1940s, though these are not as ubiquitous as in Highlandtown. The neighborhood is also known for its azalea bushes that line some of the streets.

== History ==
The area that comprises today's Joseph Lee neighborhood was part of the Baltimore Canton Company's (founded by Peter Cooper, William Patterson, Robert Oliver, and Columbus O'Donnell) original purchase of 3,000 acres (12 km^{2}) of land in 1828. While most of the development of the land occurred nearer to the waterfront before the 1900s, the company was still involved in the development when the Joseph Lee neighborhood was created. In the book, "Streetwise Baltimore: the stories behind baltimore street names" by Carleton Jones, an entry for "Drew Street" is found on page 66 that reads:

Dan Drew was one of the slipperiest Wall Street customers who ever graced New York, but he also invested in Baltimore's Canton Company. In a 1918 annexation the firm, large east side landowners, christened the street in Drew's name. It is just west of Key Medical Center and leads into and across Eastern Avenue.

The land became part of Baltimore City with the March 29, 1918, annex that expanded the city limits to their present size. The neighborhood was built in the shadow of the existing City Hospitals (Francis Scott Key Medical Center), which housed the Bay View Asylum, acute care, chronic care, and tuberculosis (TB) wards. Construction of the homes in the neighborhood began as early as 1926, beginning on Anglesea and Bonsal streets. By 1933, home construction was complete for the homes through to Cornwall street. New homes continued to be built continuing westward from Drew to Kane Streets through the 1950s.

Several development projects in and around the neighborhood have been started in recent years to improve the look and value of the community. In early 2006, a former Anchor Fence plant and headquarters was redeveloped into "Anchor Square" an open-air shopping center. Also in 2006, a new 563,000-square-foot (52,300 m^{2}) biomedical research facility opened on the Johns Hopkins Bayview Medical Center campus to house the National Institutes on Aging and Drug Abuse. An urgent-care center, Patient First, opened on the Bayview campus in 2007. In late 2007, a "Streetscape" project was initiated to beautify and improve the road and sidewalks of Eastern Avenue.

== Demographics ==
As of the census of 2010, there were 2,175 people living in the neighborhood. The racial makeup of Joseph Lee was 61.1% White, 16.5% African American, 0.6% Native American, 3.2% Asian, 1.0% from other races, and 4.6% from two or more races. Hispanic or Latino of any race were 13.0% of the population. Joseph Lee has a growing Hispanic and Latino population, especially Puerto Ricans.

There were 1,165 housing units in the neighborhood.

49.4% of the population were employed, 0.8% were unemployed, and 50.6% were not in the labor force. The median household income was $27,569.

== Schools ==
Patterson Senior High is a school that is part of the Baltimore City Public School System. Located on the eastern side of the neighborhood on Kane Street.

Our Lady of Fatima School was a private grade K - 8 school run by the Archdiocese of Baltimore located to the south of Patterson High school on Pratt Street. The building now houses a public charter school and preschool operated by St. Vincent De Paul charities.

== Political Representatives ==
Voting districts: 26th Ward, Precincts 004 & 005

US Congress:

Congressional district: 3

Represented by: John Sarbanes

Senators: Chris Van Hollen, Benjamin L. Cardin

State of Maryland:

Legislative district: 46

State Delegates: Pete A. Hammen, Carolyn J. Krysiak, Brian K. McHale

State Senator: George W. Della, Jr.

Baltimore City:

Baltimore City Council District: 1

Represented by: Jim Kraft

Joseph Lee Community Association:

President: Eline Welkie

== Sources ==
- - Mayor O'Malley to Put Finishing Touches on Latest Grocery Store Coming to Baltimore City
- - National Institutes of Health, Johns Hopkins University Mark Partnership for New Biomedical Research Center
- - Coming to Bayview: Patient First
