= Baltimore American Indian Center =

Organization in Upper Fell's Point, Baltimore, Maryland, US

Baltimore American Indian Center, Inc.

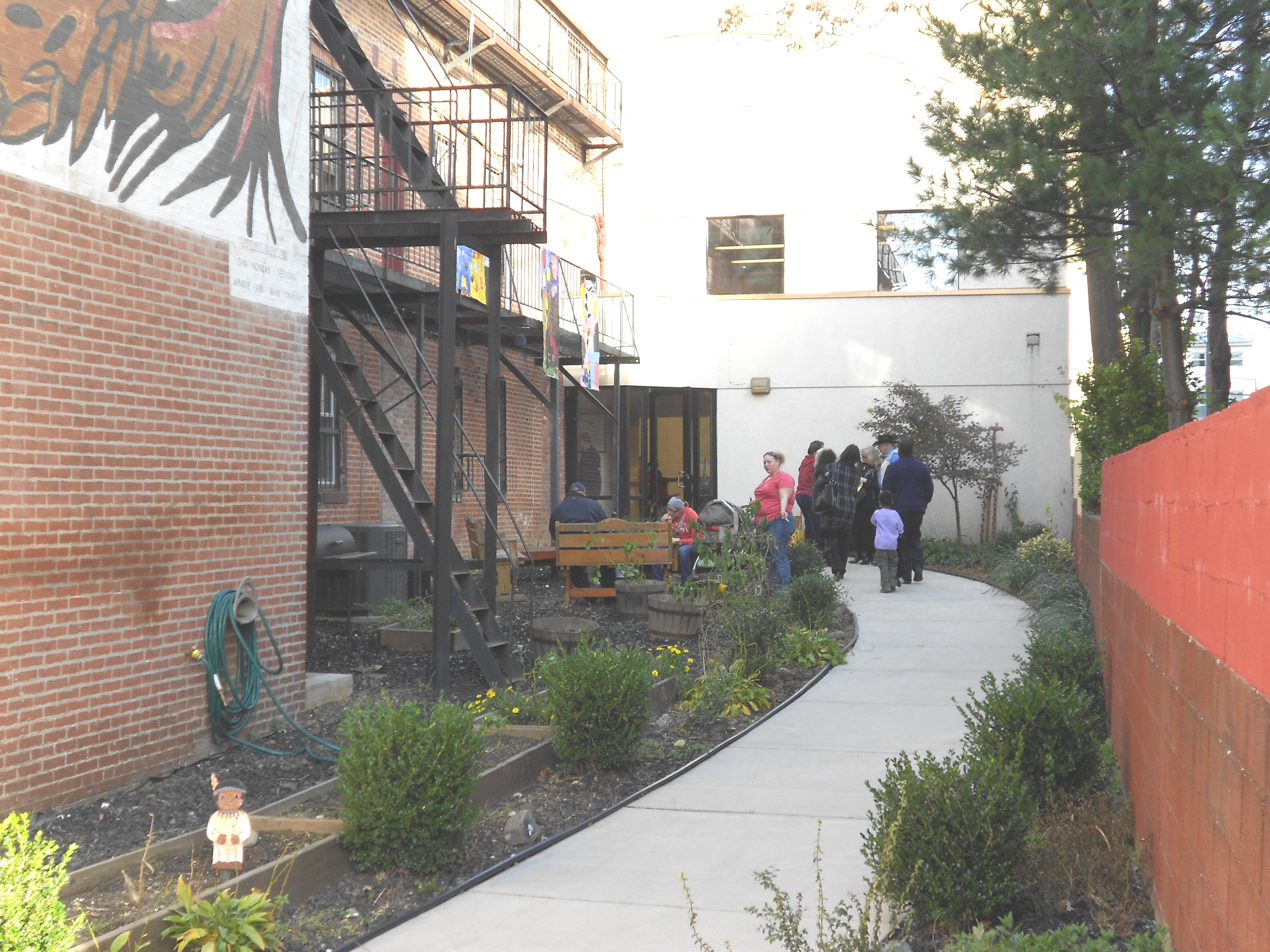
- Walkway through community garden
- Founded: 1968
- Type: Native American community center
- Location: 113 South Broadway. Baltimore, Maryland, United States
- Region served: Baltimore
- Key people: Linda Cox (Chair), Juan Boston (Vice Chair)
- Website: baltimoreamericanindiancenter.org
- Baltimore American Indian Center and Heritage Museum
- U.S. National Register of Historic Places
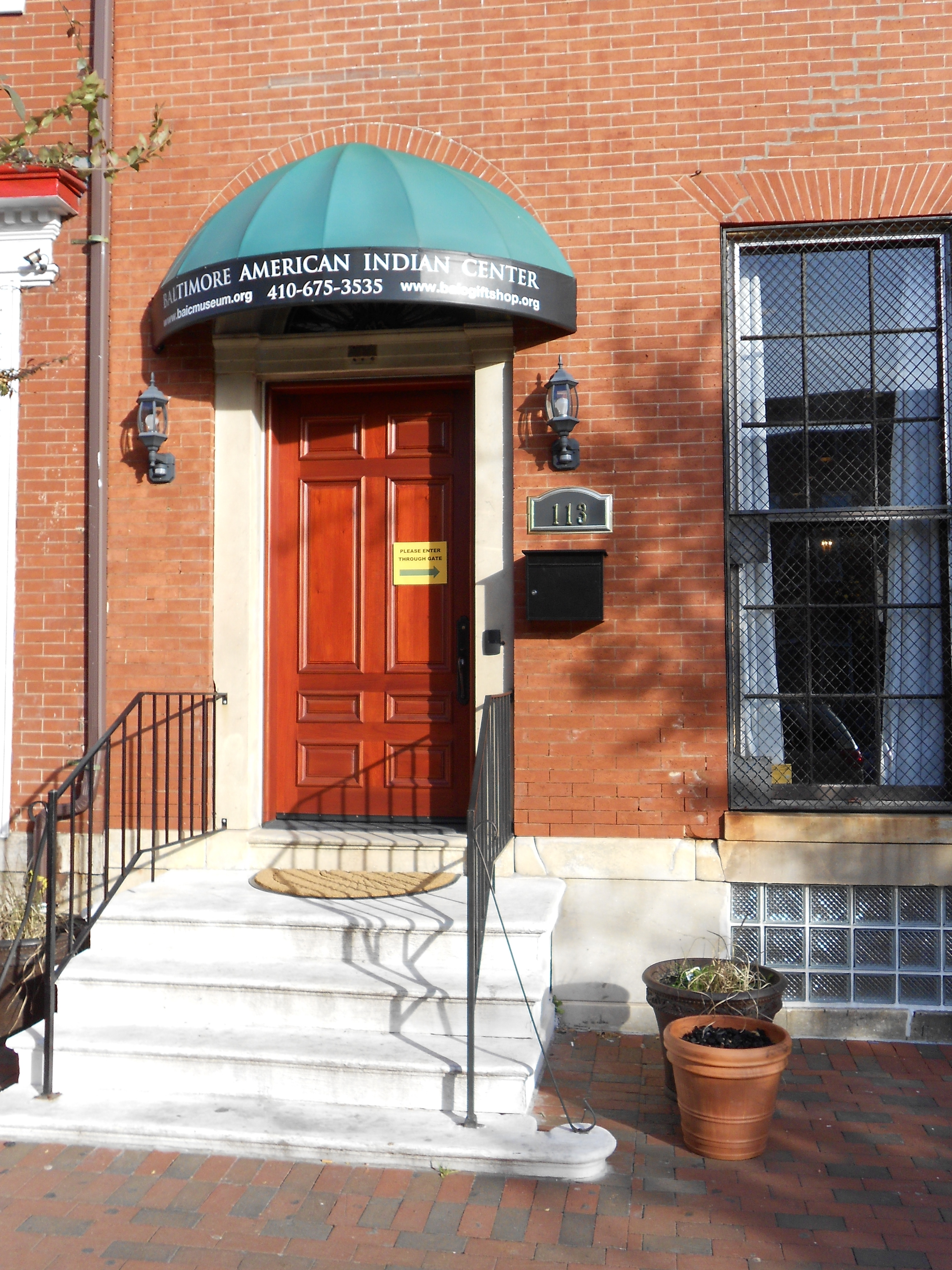
- Front of building

- Location within Baltimore Location within Maryland Location within the United States
- Location: 113 S. Broadway; Baltimore, Maryland
- Coordinates: 39°17′24″N 76°35′37″W
- Area: Less than one acre
- Architect: Edwin Robinson
- MPS: American Indian Heritage in Baltimore City, 1885 to Present (2025)
- NRHP reference No.: 100012255
- Added to NRHP: September 23, 2025

The Baltimore American Indian Center, Inc. (BAIC) is a center for American Indians that is located in Upper Fell's Point, Baltimore, Maryland. The center was founded in 1968 as the "American Indian Study Center" to serve the growing Native American community in Baltimore. In 2011, the Center reestablished its museum for American Indian heritage.

The center hosts the Native American After School Art Program, founded by community artist and Lumbee Tribal member Ashley Minner in 2007.

In 2015, local artist Dean Tonto Cox, grandson of one of the founders of the Baltimore American Indian Center, Elizabeth Locklear, repainted an outside mural of the center.

It was listed on the National Register of Historic Places in 2025.
