= Bayview, Baltimore =

Bayview aka Hopkins-Bayview
- neighborhood statistical area
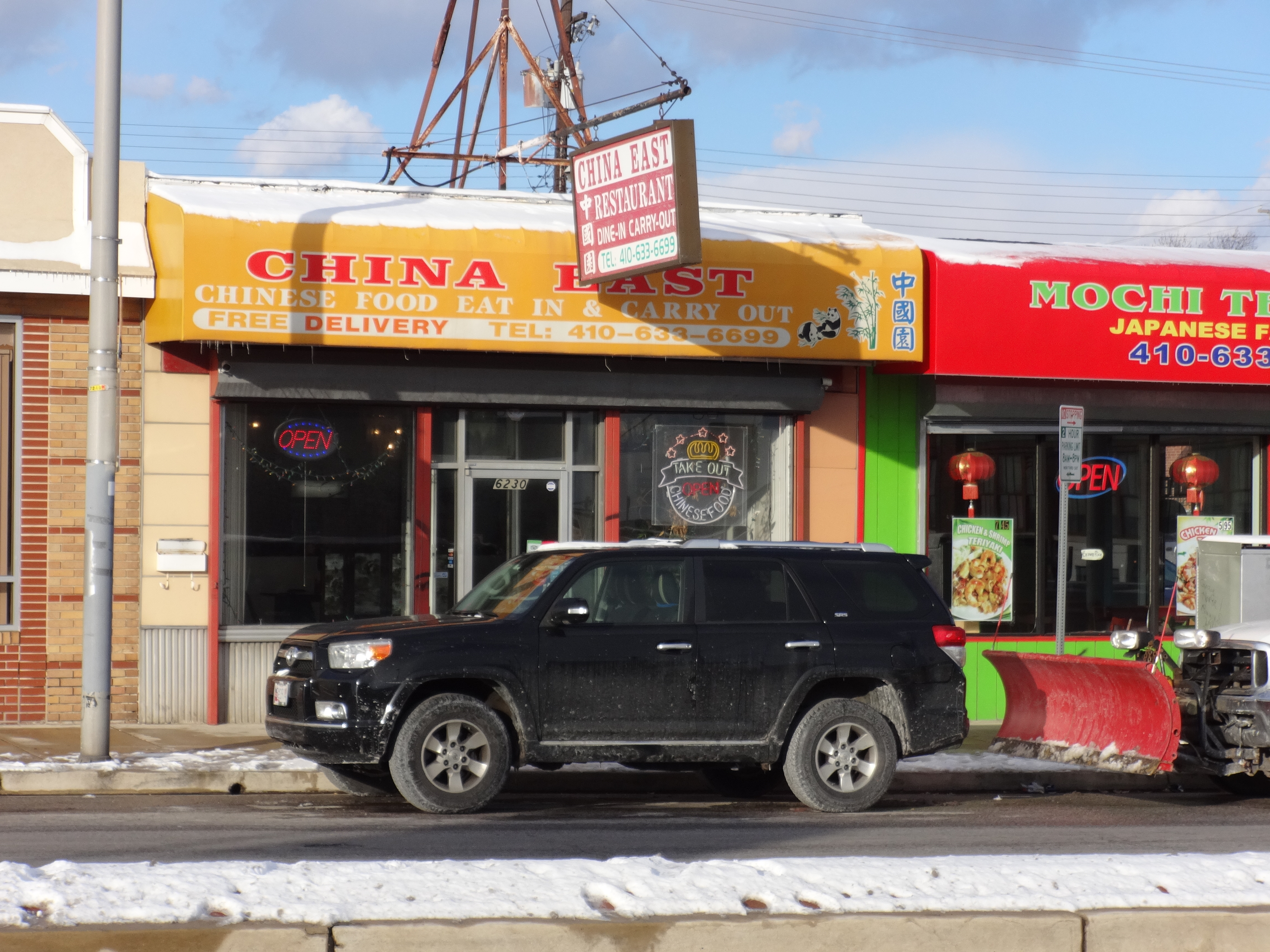
- Restaurants in Bayview

- Location within Baltimore
- Coordinates: 39°17′29″N 76°32′47″W
- Country: United States
- State: Maryland
- City: Baltimore

Area
  - Total: 0.450 sq mi (1.17 km^{2})
  - Land: 0.450 sq mi (1.17 km^{2})

Population (2009)
  - Total: 506
  - Density: 1,120/sq mi (434/km^{2})
- Time zone: UTC-5 (Eastern)
  - Summer (DST): UTC-4 (EDT)
- ZIP code: 21224
- Area code: 410, 443, and 667

Bayview, or Hopkins-Bayview, is a neighborhood located in the Southeast District of Baltimore between the Pulaski industrial area (East) and Greektown (West).

The neighborhood is bounded by Lombard Street to the north, Kane Street to the east, Eastern Avenue to the south, and I-895 to the west. Also included in this area is the Joseph Lee neighborhood. Historically, this neighborhood was referred to as "A to K" due to the alphabetical naming of the streets Anglesea, Bonsal, Cornwall, Drew, Elrino, Folcroft, Gusryan, Hornel, Imla, Joplin, and Kane.

Central to this neighborhood is the 130-acre (0.53 km^{2}) Johns Hopkins Bayview Medical Center. Also found on the campus are two branches of the National Institutes of Health, the National Institute on Aging and the National Institute on Drug Abuse.

== Demographics ==
As of the census of 2000, there were 460 people living in the neighborhood. The racial makeup of Hopkins-Bayview was 55.4% White, 29.3% African American, 0.9% Native American, 10.9% Asian, 3.3% from other races, and 0.9% from two or more races. Hispanic or Latino people of any race were 3.3% of the population.

There were 95 housing units in the neighborhood. 12.5% of the occupied housing units were owner-occupied. 3.2% of housing units were vacant.

27.4% of the population were employed, 0% were unemployed, and 72.6% were not in the labor force. The median household income was $28,750. About 9.1% of the population were below the poverty line.

== See also ==
- List of Baltimore neighborhoods
