= Patients First =

Patients First may refer to:

- Patients First (advocacy group), a British group campaigning for whistleblowers in the NHS
- Patients First, an American chain of walk-in clinics
- Patients First, a 1979 consultation leading to the UK Health Services Act 1980
- "Patients First", a 2008 piece of creative non-fiction writing by Sandra K. Ellston
- Patients First, a 2009 campaign of Americans for Prosperity
- Patients First, a 2024 campaign of the Irish Nurses and Midwives Organisation
- Patients First: How to Save the NHS, a 2024 book by Leslie Turnberg

== See also ==
- Empowering Patients First Act, in U.S. legislation
- Patient First, a chain of urgent care centers in the United States
