= History of Greeks in Baltimore =

The history of Greeks in Baltimore dates back to the late 19th and early 20th centuries. Baltimore is home to one of the largest Greek American communities in the United States. The community is centered in the Greektown and Highlandtown neighborhoods of East Baltimore.

== Demographics ==
In 1920, 699 foreign-born White people in Baltimore spoke the Greek language as their mother tongue.

In 1940, around 1,200 Greek Americans lived in Baltimore. In the same year 1,193 immigrants from Greece lived in Baltimore. These immigrants comprised 2% of the city's foreign-born white population.

The Greek community in the Baltimore metropolitan area numbered 16,764 as of 2000, making up 0.7 percent of the area's population. In the same year Baltimore city's Greek population was 2,693, 0.4% of the city's population.

As of 2011, immigrants from Greece were the twenty-fourth largest foreign-born population in Baltimore and the Greek language was the ninth most commonly spoken language among those who spoke English "less than very well".

In 2013, an estimated 2,611 Greek Americans resided in Baltimore city, 0.4% of the population.

== History ==
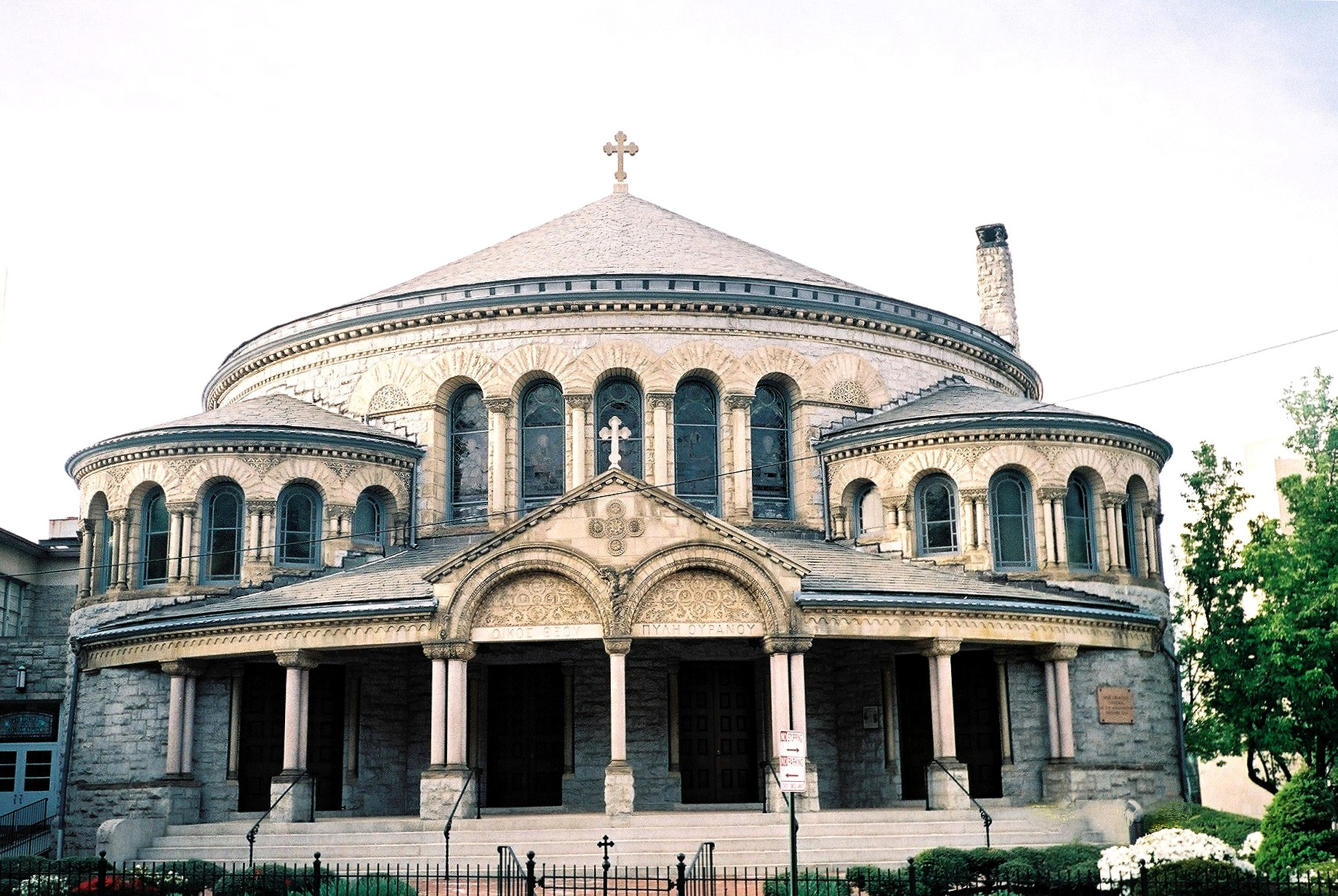
Greek Orthodox Cathedral of the Annunciation, April 2006.

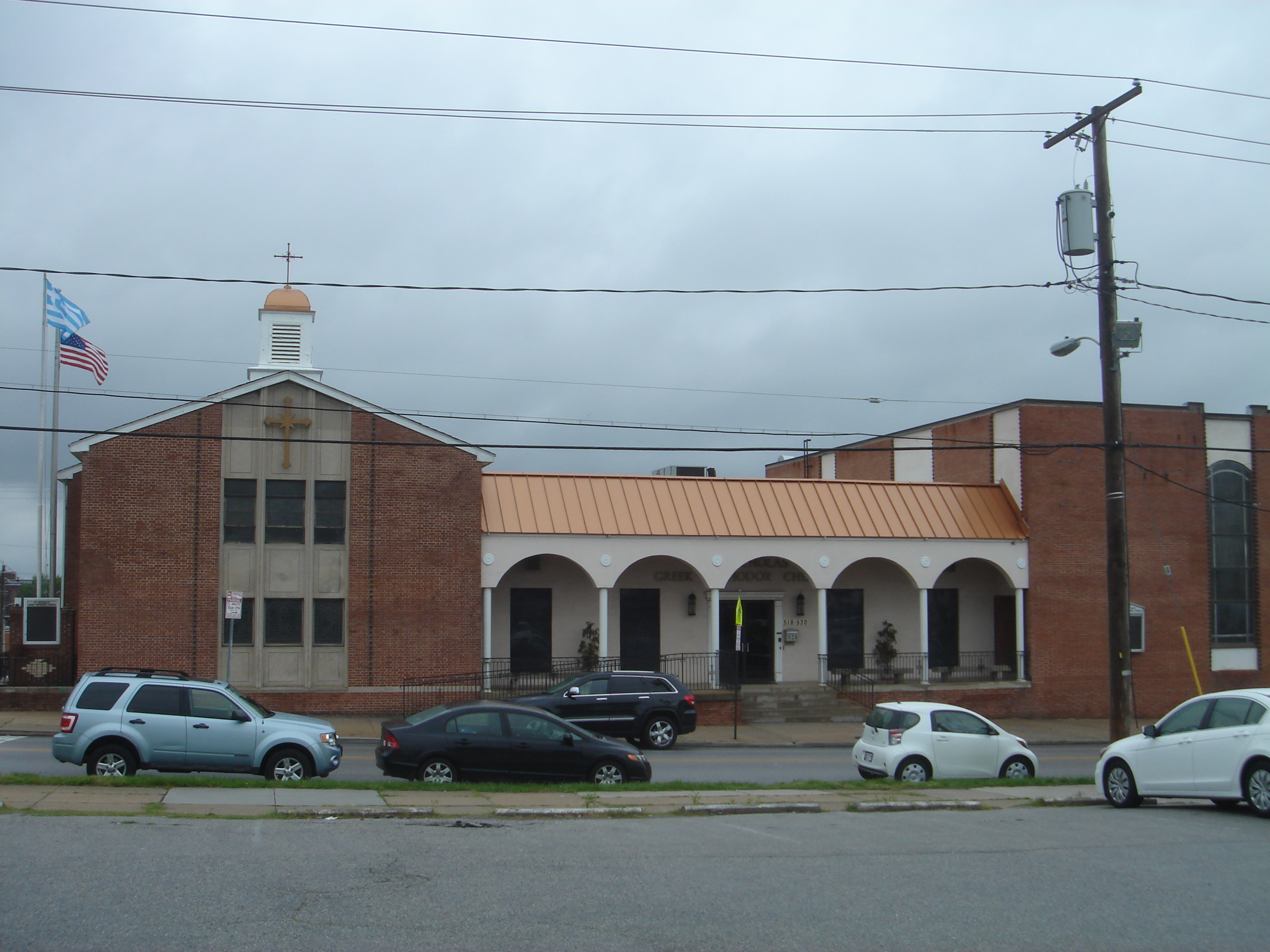
St. Nicholas Greek Orthodox Church, April 2013

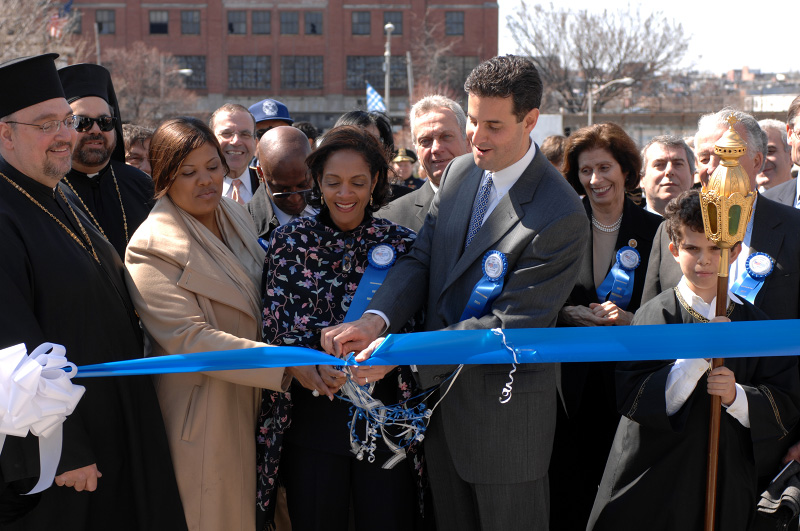
John Sarbanes and Sheila Dixon, cutting ribbon at 2007 Baltimore Greek Independence Day Parade.

=== 19th century ===
The first Greeks in Baltimore were nine young boys who arrived as refugees of the Chios Massacre, the slaughter of tens of thousands of Greeks on the island of Chios at the hands of the Ottomans during the Greek War of Independence.

Immigrants from Greece first started to settle in Baltimore in large numbers during the 1890s.

=== 20th century ===
Early Greek settlers established the Greek Orthodox Church “Evangelismos” in 1906 and the Greek Orthodox Cathedral of the Annunciation in 1909.

By the 1920s, a vibrant yet small Greek community had been firmly established. The St. Nicholas Greek Orthodox Church was built to serve this growing community. Because there was no direct steamship service from the Mediterranean to the port of Baltimore, many Greek immigrants came by train, often from New York City.

The peak of the Greek migration to Baltimore was between the 1930s and the 1950s. The Greek community gained its first political representation in 1959, when Peter Angelos became the first Greek American to be elected to the Baltimore City Council.

The Greek population saw another smaller surge in numbers after the passage of the Immigration and Nationality Act of 1965, which allowed for the immigration of thousands of Greeks. This wave of Greek immigrants to Baltimore ended by the early 1980s. During the 1980s the Greek residents of the neighborhood that was then known simply as the Hill successfully petitioned the city government to rename the neighborhood as Greektown. By that time the Greek community was 25,000 strong.

=== 21st century ===
While there is still a strong Greek-American presence in Greektown and Highlandtown, the population of the Greek community has been declining. The population is aging and many have moved out of the original Greek neighborhoods. The Latino population is increasing rapidly as the Greek population decreases. The majority of newcomers to the neighborhood are now Latino.

== Culture ==
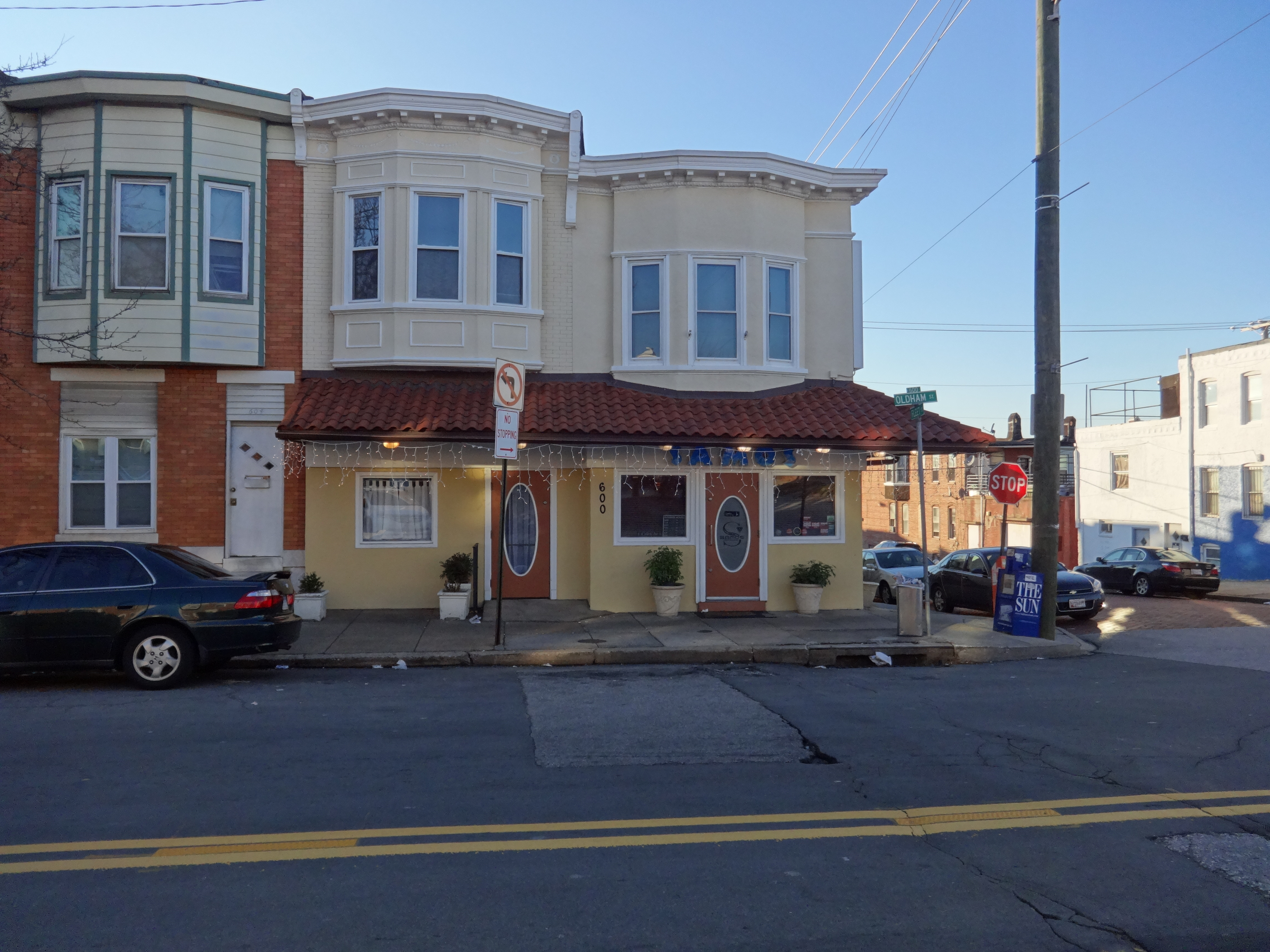
Samos Restaurant, Greektown, December 2014.

There are a number of Greek-American restaurants in Baltimore, such as Ikaros, The Acropolis, The Black Olive, Samos, and Zorba's. There is also an annual Greek Folk Festival held at Saint Nicholas Greek Orthodox Church.

Baltimore historically had a Greek mafia presence. A two-year FBI investigation into a cocaine ring run by the Greek mafia in Baltimore, Philadelphia, and Washington, D.C. resulted in charges being filed in August 1987.

== Religion ==
Most Greek Americans in Baltimore belong to the Greek Orthodox Church, though a small minority have been Greek Jews. Most Greek Jews immigrated to the city during the early 1950s. The majority came from Thessaloniki, with the remainder mostly coming from Athens and Patras. The Greek Jews of Baltimore are primarily Sephardi. There are few Sephardim in Baltimore and there is no formal Greek synagogue or organization, so Sephardi Greek Jews have mostly joined the Ashkenazi community and have adopted many Ashkenazi customs. However, the Greek Jews of Baltimore have tended to preserve Greek Sephardi Orthodox naming customs and Greek Sephardi cuisine. During the Passover seder, Baltimore's Greek Jews traditionally serve hard-boiled eggs, avgolemono with lamb and matzah balls, latkes, and almond paste.

== Notable Greek Americans from Baltimore ==
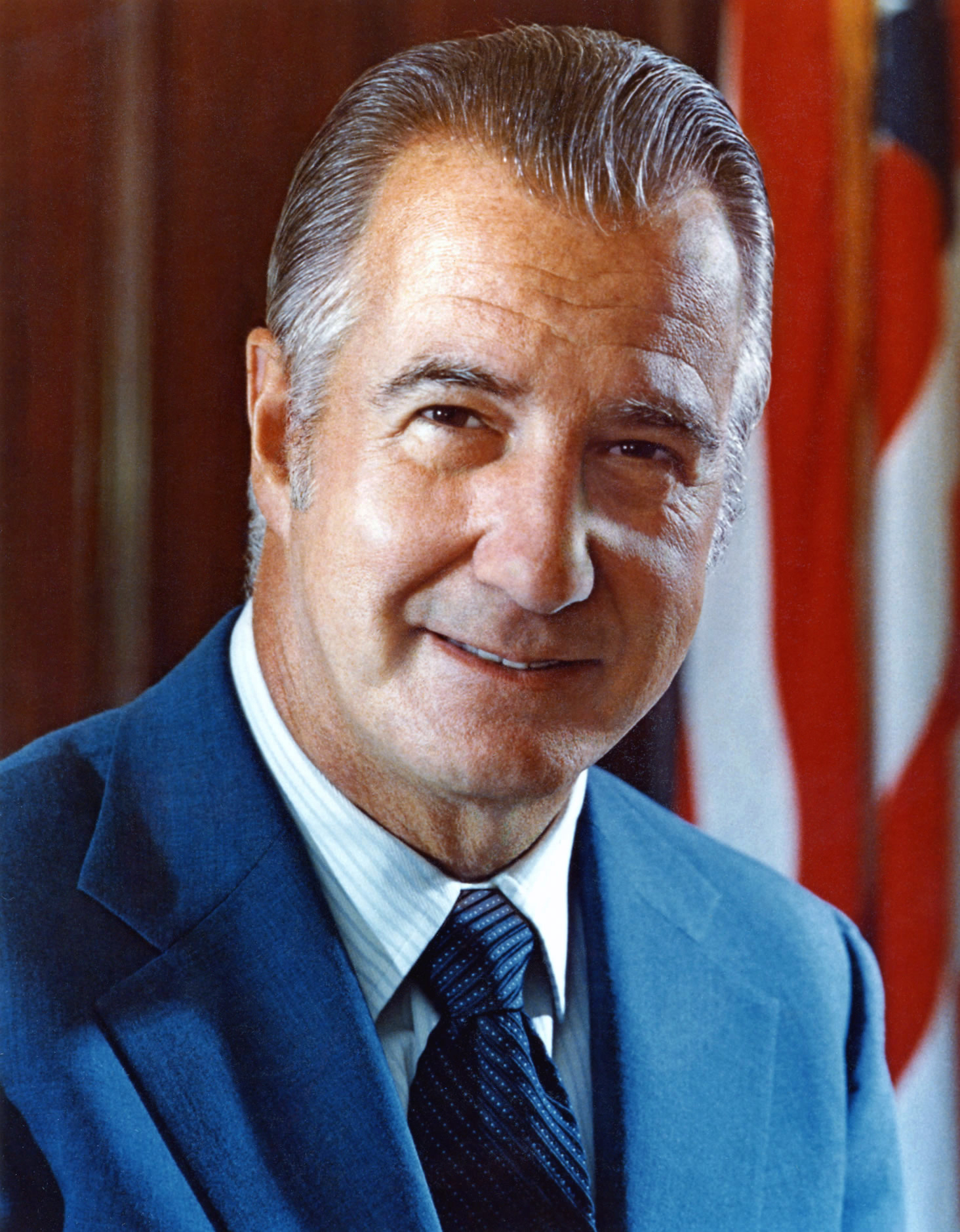
Spiro Agnew, the 39th Vice President of the United States (1969–1973), serving under President Richard Nixon, and the 55th Governor of Maryland (1967–1969). He was the first Greek American to hold these offices.

- Spiro Agnew, a politician who served as the 39th Vice President of the United States from 1969 to 1973 under President Richard Nixon.
- Peter Angelos, a trial lawyer and the majority owner of the Baltimore Orioles.
- Sam Boulmetis, Sr., a retired Thoroughbred horse racing jockey who was inducted in the National Museum of Racing and Hall of Fame in 1973.
- Gregg Karukas, Grammy winning smooth jazz keyboardist, producer, composer and pianist.
- Peter Moskos, a former Baltimore Police Department officer who is now an assistant professor at John Jay College of Criminal Justice and the CUNY Graduate Center in the Department of Sociology.
- John Sarbanes, the U.S. representative for Maryland's 3rd congressional district serving since 2007.
- Paul Sarbanes, a Democratic politician who served as a member of the United States House of Representatives from 1971 to 1977 and as a United States Senator from 1977 to 2007.
- Ioanna Sfekas-Karvelas, a dramatic soprano who has sung leading roles in both the United States and Europe.
- Stavros Halkias, comedian and podcast host.

== See also ==
- Ethnic groups in Baltimore
- History of Baltimore
