= Our Lady of the Rosary High School (Baltimore) =

Location
- 420 South Chester Street; Baltimore, Maryland; United States; 39°17′12″N 76°35′13.5″W

Information
- Type: Private
- Religious affiliation: Roman Catholic
- Closed: 2004
- Grades: 9 to 12

Our Lady of the Rosary High School was a co-ed secondary school affiliated with the Archdiocese of Baltimore and located in Upper Fells Point in Baltimore, Maryland. The school closed in 2004 due to lack of funding.
