= Highlandtown Arts District =

Coordinates: 39°17′18″N 76°34′23″W

The Highlandtown Arts District (a.k.a. "ha!" and Highlandtown Arts and Entertainment District) is the largest such designated area in the state of Maryland, encompassing the southeast Baltimore neighborhoods of Highlandtown, Patterson Park and portions of the Canton and Greektown neighborhoods. In the Highlandtown Arts District, artists live and work in an area known for cultural diversity. The "ha!" district has extensive retail and industrial spaces, along with affordable housing, with easy access to Interstate 95, Interstate 895, Fell's Point and Downtown Baltimore.

Events held in "ha!" include the Great Halloween Lantern Parade, a farmer's market, the Artket festival, Salsapolkalooza, and Highlandtown Wine Festival.

== External sources ==
- Highlandtown Community Association
- Schiavone Fine Art
- Creative Alliance
- Southeast Community Development Corporation
- Highlandtown Merchants Association
- Friends of Patterson Park
- Di Pasquale's Italian Marketplace
- Greetings from Highlandtown
- SkyLofts Studios and Gallery
