= John Sarbanes =

American politician (born 1962)

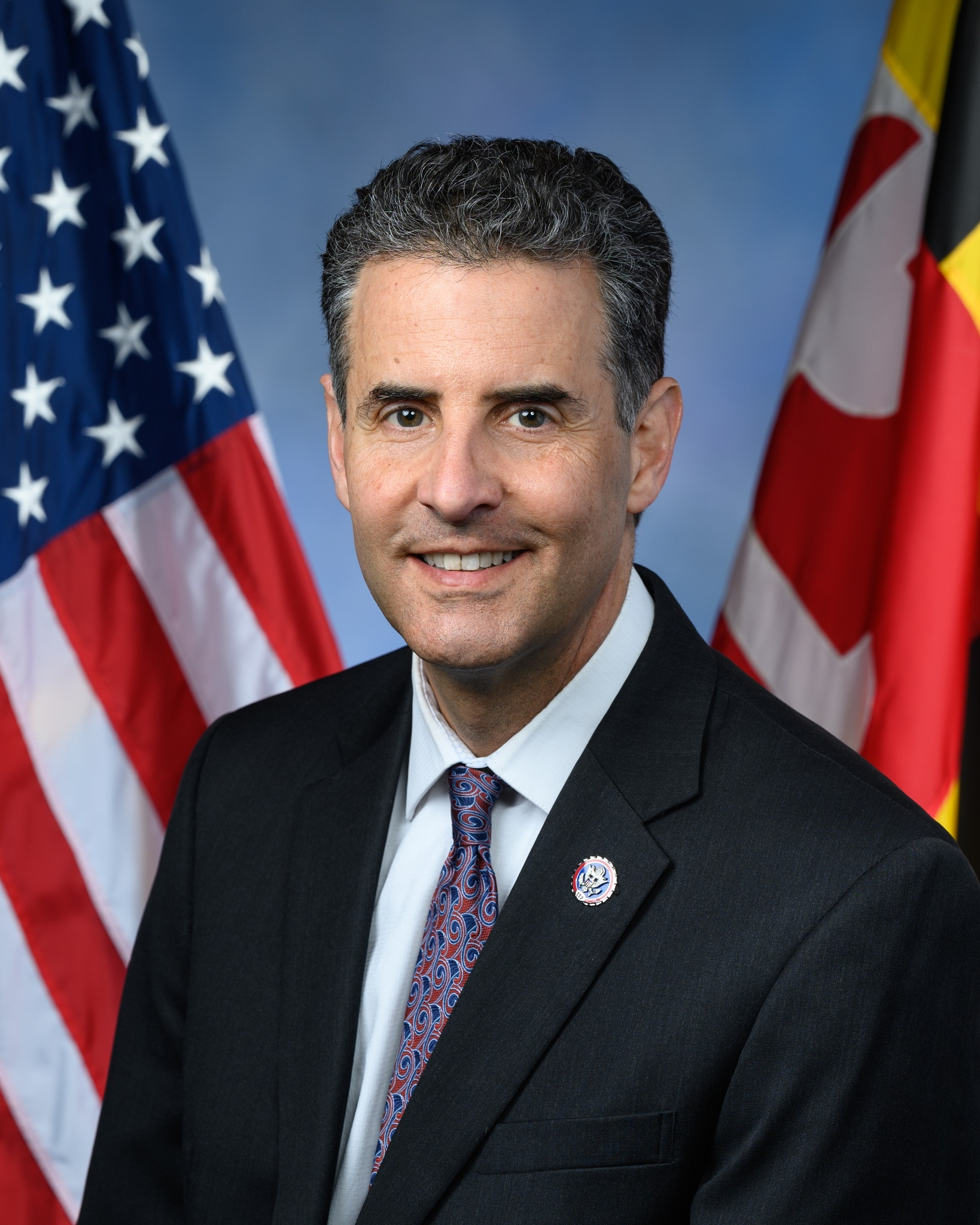
- Official portrait, 2021

Member of the U.S. House of Representatives from Maryland's 3rd district
- In office January 3, 2007 – January 3, 2025
- Preceded by: Ben Cardin
- Succeeded by: Sarah Elfreth

Personal details
- Born: John Peter Spyros Sarbanes; May 22, 1962 (age 64) Baltimore, Maryland, U.S.
- Party: Democratic
- Spouse: Dina Caplan (m. 1988)
- Children: 3
- Relatives: Paul Sarbanes (father)
- Education: Princeton University (BA); Harvard University (JD)
- Website: House website
- Sarbanes's voice Sarbanes recognizing the 47th anniversary of the Turkish invasion of Cyprus. Recorded July 20, 2021

John Peter Spyros Sarbanes (/ˈsɑːrbeɪnz/ SAR-baynz; born May 22, 1962) is an American lawyer and politician who served as the U.S. representative for Maryland's 3rd congressional district from 2007 to 2025. He is a member of the Democratic Party. At his retirement, his district included Annapolis, the entirety of Howard County, and parts of Anne Arundel and Carroll counties.

== Early life ==
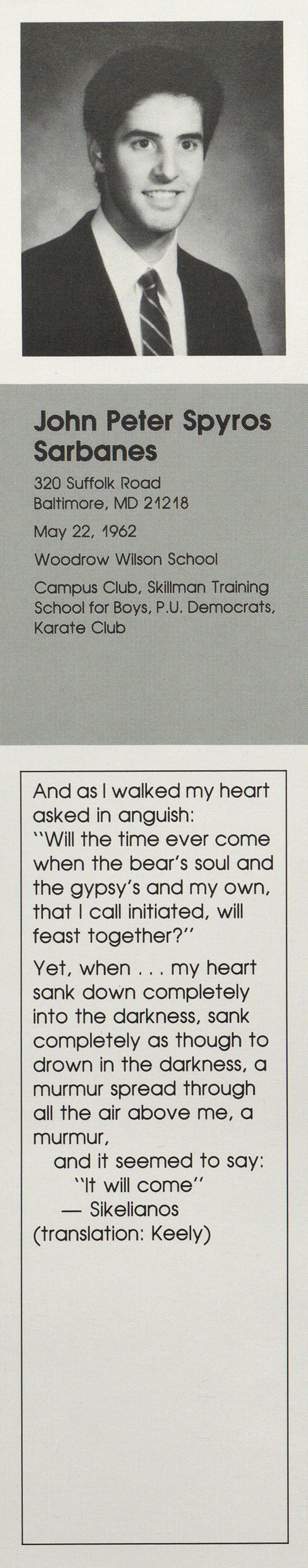
Sarbanes in the Princeton University yearbook, 1984

Sarbanes is the eldest son of former U.S. Senator Paul Sarbanes (who had served as a U.S. representative from 1971 to 1977 and senator from 1977 to 2007) and Christine Dunbar Sarbanes, a teacher. He was born in Baltimore, having Greek origin on his father's side and English on his mother's, and graduated from the Gilman School there in 1980. He received a B.A. cum laude from the Princeton School of Public and International Affairs at Princeton University in 1984, after completing a 194-page long senior thesis titled "The American Intelligence Community Abroad: Potential for a Breakdown Case Study, Greece, 1967". He then received a J.D. from Harvard Law School, where he was co-chair of the Law School Democrats, in 1988.

After college, Sarbanes served for seven years with the Maryland State Department of Education, working on Maryland’s public school system. He later clerked with Judge J. Frederick Motz on the United States District Court for the District of Maryland. Sarbanes spent his professional legal career at the law firm of Venable LLP in Baltimore from 1989 to 2006, where he was a member of the hiring committee from 1992 to 1996 and chair of healthcare practice from 2000 to 2006 .

== U.S. House of Representatives ==
=== Committee assignments ===
- Committee on Energy and Commerce
  - Subcommittee on Energy
  - Subcommittee on Health
  - Subcommittee on Oversight and Investigations
- Committee on Oversight and Reform
  - Subcommittee on Government Operations

=== Caucus memberships ===
- Armenian Caucus
- Congressional Public Service Caucus (Co-Chair)
- House Congressional Hellenic Caucus
- United States Congressional International Conservation Caucus
- Joint Congressional Human Rights Caucus
- Pakistan Caucus
- Congressional Arts Caucus
- Congressional NextGen 9-1-1 Caucus

=== Environmental education ===
In 2009, Sarbanes introduced the No Child Left Inside Act (NCLI), which sought to both improve education in the nation's public schools and protect the environment by "creating a new environmental education grant program, providing teacher training for environmental education, and including environmental education as an authorized activity under the Fund for the Improvement of Education." The NCLI Act would also have required states that participated in the environmental education grant programs to develop a plan to ensure that high school graduates were environmentally literate. This legislation was supported by a "coalition of over 1200 local, regional, and national organizations representing millions of concerned citizens who are anxious to see a new commitment to environmental education."

=== Government reforms ===
Following their victory in the 2018 midterm elections, House Democrats unveiled their first bill for the 116th Congress, the For the People Act, which had been primarily authored by Sarbanes. It passed the House in 2019, but died in the Republican-controlled Senate. The bill was introduced again in the 117th Congress and passed the House.

The bill was a package of Democratic electoral goals which would have enabled small-dollar public funding of congressional elections, established automatic national voter registration, expanded early and online voter registration, and provided greater federal support for state voting systems. The bill would also have banned members of Congress from serving on corporate boards, required political advocacy groups to disclose donors, required presidents to disclose their tax returns, and required the establishment of a Supreme Court ethics code. It also included a provision to decrease gerrymandering by creating independent commissions. At the time, Sarbanes' district was considered one of the worst gerrymanders in the United States.

== Campaigns ==
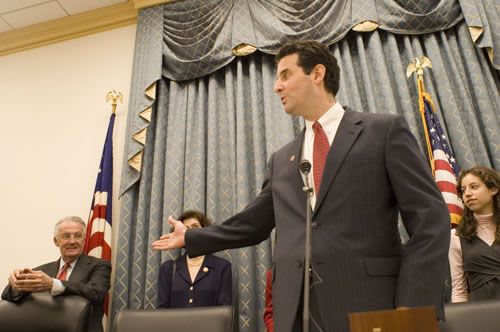
John Sarbanes at his swearing-in ceremony gesturing towards his father on the far left, former Senator Paul Sarbanes

Sarbanes sought the Democratic nomination for Maryland's 3rd congressional district after 10-term incumbent Ben Cardin gave up the seat to run for the Senate seat of Sarbanes' father, Paul Sarbanes. The primary campaign included state senator Paula Hollinger, former Baltimore City health commissioner Peter Beilenson, and former Maryland Democratic Party treasurer Oz Bengur. Sarbanes won the nomination on September 12, 2006, with 31.9% of the vote. His opponent in the general election was Annapolis marketing executive John White. The 3rd was a heavily Democratic district that has been in that party's hands since 1927, and Sarbanes did not have much difficulty in the election. He also benefited from name recognition, as his father had represented the district from 1971 to 1977. On November 7, 2006, Sarbanes won the general election with 64% of the vote to White's 34% and Libertarian Charles Curtis McPeek's 2%. He was reelected eight times with no substantive opposition.

For his first eight terms, Sarbanes represented a district that spilled across portions of Anne Arundel, Baltimore, Howard, and Montgomery counties, as well as much of downtown Baltimore city. Redistricting after the 2020 census made the district much more compact. He lost his shares of both Baltimore city and Baltimore County, areas which had been part of the 3rd and its predecessors for decades. In their place, he picked up a large slice of Carroll County, all of Howard County and more of Anne Arundel County. This left his home in Towson in Baltimore County outside the district, though members of the House are only required to live in the state they represent rather than the district.

On October 26, 2023, Sarbanes announced he would not seek reelection in 2024.

== Post-congressional career ==
In January 2025, Sarbanes became a distinguished practitioner in residence at Johns Hopkins University's Stavros Niarchos Foundation Agora Institute.

== Political positions ==
Sarbanes voted with President Joe Biden's stated position 100% of the time in the 117th Congress, according to a FiveThirtyEight analysis. He also voted with Biden 96.2% of the time in the 118th Congress through 2023.

== Personal life ==
Sarbanes lives in Towson, Maryland, with his three children and wife Dina Eve Caplan, who he met at Harvard and married in 1988.

Sarbanes is a member of the Greek Orthodox Church.

U.S. House of Representatives
Preceded by Ben Cardin	Member of the U.S. House of Representatives from Maryland's 3rd congressional district 2007–2025	Succeeded by Sarah Elfreth
U.S. order of precedence (ceremonial)
Preceded by Wayne Gilchrest as Former U.S. Representative	Order of precedence of the United States as Former U.S. Representative	Succeeded by Thomas Downey as Former U.S. Representative
