= History of Hispanics and Latinos in Baltimore =

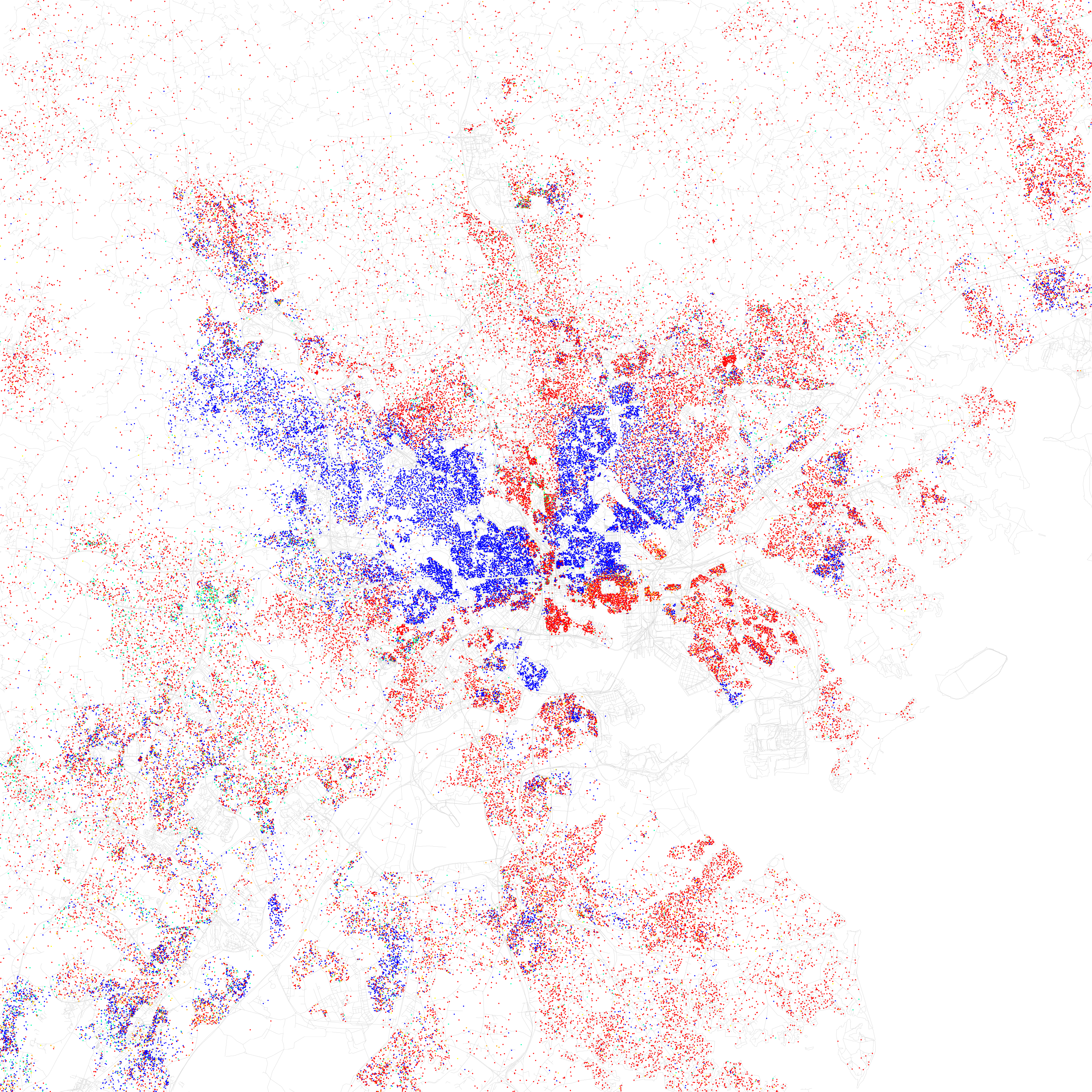
Map of racial distribution in Baltimore, 2010 U.S. Census. Each dot is 25 people: White, Black, Asian Hispanic, or Other (yellow)

The history of Hispanics and Latinos in Baltimore dates back to the mid-20th century. The Hispanic and Latino community of Baltimore is the fastest growing ethnic group in the city. There is a significant Hispanic/Latino presence in many Southeast Baltimore neighborhoods, particularly Highlandtown, Upper Fell's Point, and Greektown. Overall Baltimore has a small but growing Hispanic population, primarily in the Southeast portion of the area from Fells Point to Dundalk.

== Demographics ==
In 1920, 322 foreign-born White people in Baltimore spoke the Spanish language as their mother tongue.

In the 1930 United States census, there were fewer than 1,000 foreign-born Latinos in Baltimore.

In the 1960 United States census, Baltimore was home to 429 people born in Puerto Rico and 214 people born in Mexico.

As of the 2000 Census, the Spanish language was spoken at home by 17,805 people in Baltimore. In the same year, 10,193 Latin American-born immigrants lived in Baltimore, comprising 34.4% of all foreign-born residents of the city. This made Latin America the largest region of origin for immigrants.

In 2000 Latinos constituted 1.7% of the population and by 2009 Latinos had increased to 3% of the population. As of 2010, Latinos are 4.2% of Baltimore. At 123,029 Latinos as of 2010, Baltimore has the 56th largest Latino metropolitan population in the United States.

As of 2011, the Spanish language (including Spanish Creole) was the most commonly spoken language in Baltimore among those who spoke English "less than very well". Additionally, 19,708 Latin Americans immigrants lived in Baltimore, making Latin America the largest region of origin for immigrants.

Mexican Americans are the largest Latino group in the city. Mexicans make up slightly over a quarter (26%) of Baltimore's Hispanic population, forming a slight plurality over other Hispanics. There are also sizable populations of Puerto Ricans, Salvadorans, Hondurans, Guatemalans, and Dominicans.

Baltimore has a small Roma community, many of whom are Gitanos who immigrated from Spain. The Spanish Roma began immigrating to Baltimore in the late 1800s and early 1900s.

Largest Hispanic/Latino groups (2010)	Number	Percentage
Total Population	620,961	100.0%
All Hispanics/Latinos	25,960	4.2%
(Mexico) Mexican	7,855	1.3%
(Puerto Rico) Puerto Rican	3,137	0.6%
(Cuba) Cuban	824	0.1%
Dominican (Dominican Republic)	1,111	0.2%
Central American (excludes Mexican)	6,921	1.1%
(Costa Rica) Costa Rican	86	0.0%
(Guatemala) Guatemalan	1,246	0.2%
(Honduras) Honduran	2,796	0.5%
(Nicaragua) Nicaraguan	101	0.0%
(Panama) Panamanian	269	0.0%
(El Salvador) Salvadoran	2,796	0.5%
Other Central American	57	0.0%
South American	2,554	0.4%
(Argentina) Argentinean	276	0.0%
(Bolivia) Bolivian	80	0.0%
(Chile) Chilean	111	0.0%
(Colombia) Colombian	492	0.1%
(Ecuador) Ecuadorian	755	0.1%
(Paraguay) Paraguayan	24	0.0%
(Peru) Peruvian	537	0.1%
(Uruguay) Uruguayan	59	0.0%
(Venezuela) Venezuelan	195	0.0%
Other South American	25	0.0%
Other Hispanic or Latino	3,558	0.6%
(Spain) Spaniard	413	0.1%
(Spain) Spanish	511	0.1%
(Spain) Spanish American	20	0.0%
All other Hispanic or Latino	2,614	0.4%

== History ==
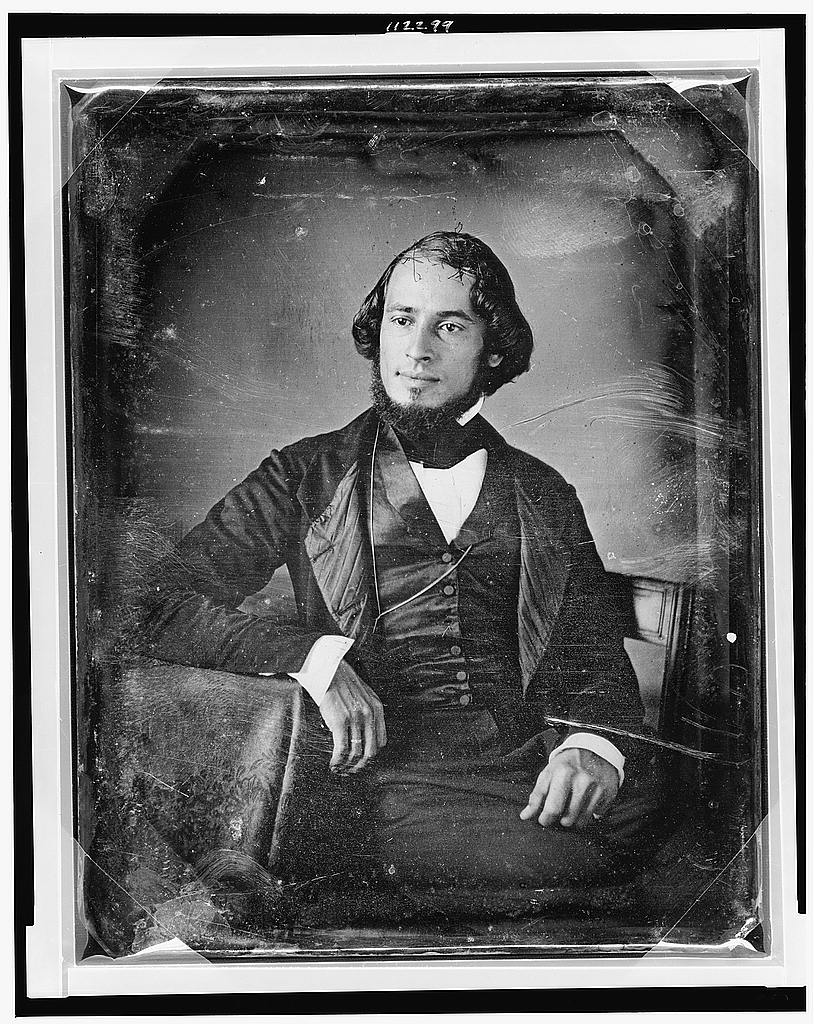
Solomon Nunes Carvalho, a Sephardi painter, photographer, author and inventor who was the chief promoter of the Beth Israel Sephardi synagogue in Baltimore.

In the early 18th century, a handful of Sephardi Spanish and Portuguese Jews settled in Baltimore. The Jewish community of Baltimore was largely composed of Ashkenazi German Jews, so the Spanish and Portuguese Jews were a small minority that was unable to form a cohesive community. An abortive attempt was made in 1856–59 to hold services according to the liturgy of the Sephardim, of which Solomon Nunes Carvalho was the chief promoter. The congregation was regularly organized in 1857, under the name "Beth Israel", with Jacob M. De Solla as minister. Many of the early Spanish and Portuguese Jews in Baltimore were unwilling to identify themselves with recent German-Jewish immigrants and regarded themselves as aristocratic Sephardim rather than as poor Ashkenazim, but nonetheless did assist both Ashkenazi and Sephardi Jews living in poverty. The Sephardi community in Baltimore was also active in the fight against antisemitic disabilities and helped to promote Maryland's "Jew Bill" that extended equal rights protections to Jewish Marylanders.

During the 1920s many Spanish Americans settled in Highlandtown, alongside many Greek Americans.

The first Latino immigrants to the city began arriving in the 1960s. Middle-class professionals were the first to immigrate, largely Central Americans and anti-Castro Cubans. They were followed by middle-class immigrants from Argentina, Mexico, Peru, and Puerto Rico.

1980 saw a second wave of Cuban immigration. Most were outcasts from Cuba, mainly poor and uneducated and many being former prisoners. During the mid-1980s, many Guatemalans and Salvadorans fled to Baltimore in order to escape the Guatemalan and Salvadoran civil wars.

As of 2012, city officials has been encouraging Latinos to immigrate to the city in order to stop or reverse Baltimore's population decline. In order to woo Latinos to the city, Mayor Stephanie Rawlings-Blake had prohibited police and social agencies from asking people about their immigration status. Rawlings-Blake has ordered the creation of a number of outreach programs for Latinos, including city-sponsored classes given in the Spanish language.

== Spanish Town ==
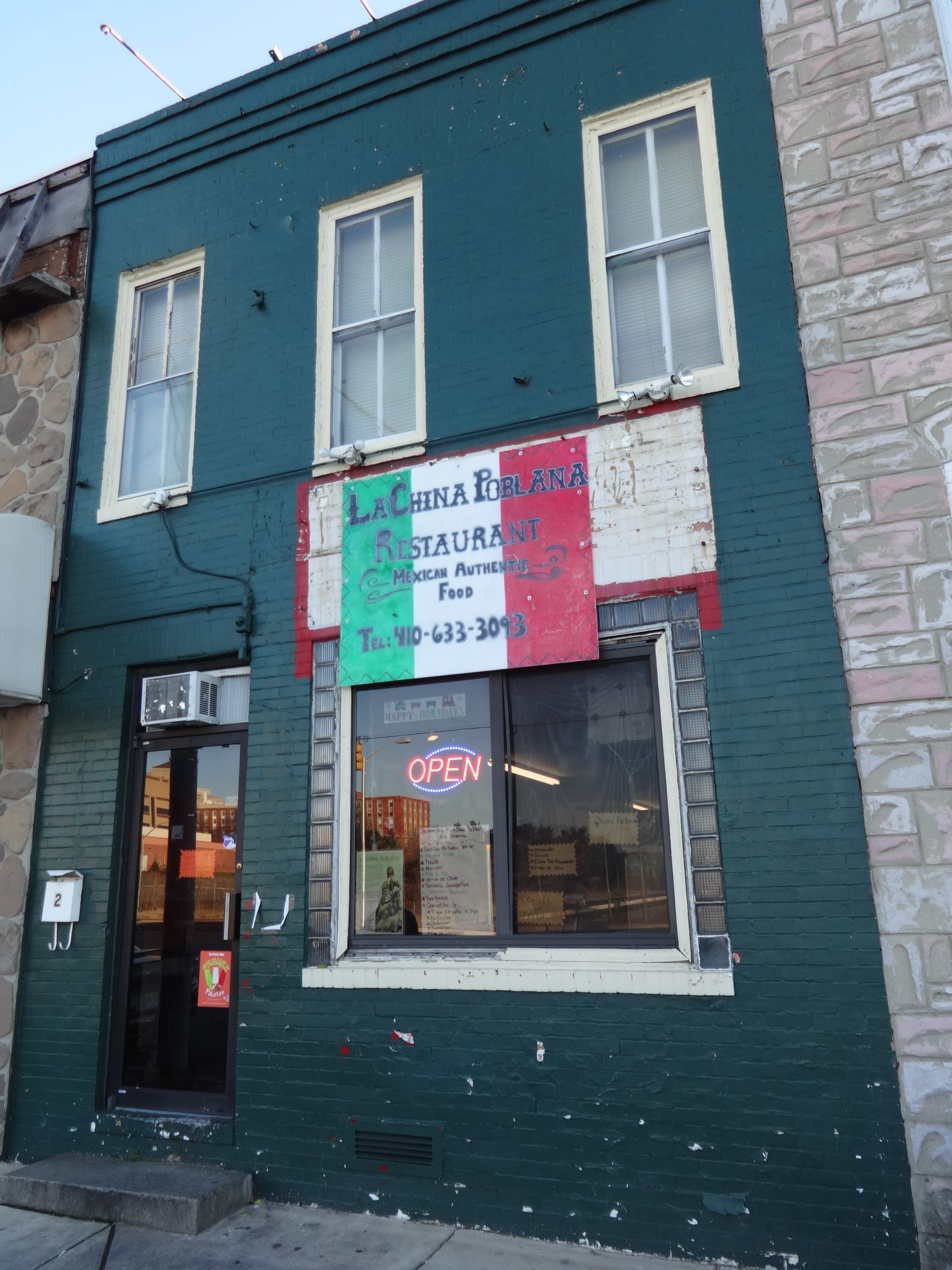
La China Poblana Mexican Restaurant, Greektown, December 2014.

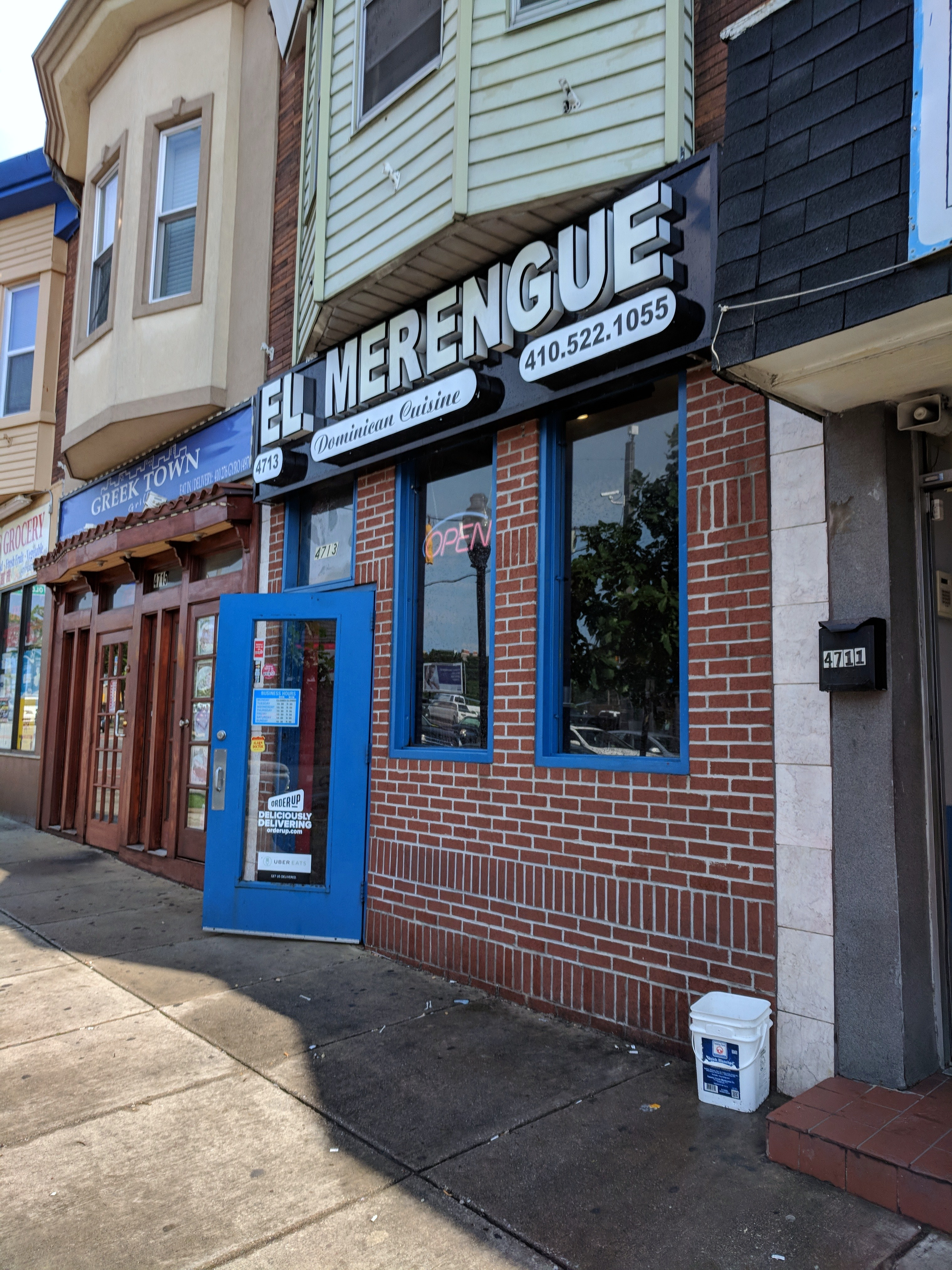
El Merengue, a Dominican restaurant in Greektown, June 2018.

The growing Latino community in Upper Fell's Point is sometimes called Spanish Town. This Spanishtown is found on Broadway Street and is home to a Dominican salon and a Salvadoran supermarket, as well as Guatemalan, Mexican, and Peruvian restaurants

In nearby Greektown, the Latino population is increasing rapidly as the Greek population decreases. Latinos have also settled in Highlandtown.

Baltimore has a relatively small, yet diverse Hispanic population. Most of Baltimore's Hispanic population is in the Southeast section of the city, in areas around Patterson Park and north of Eastern Avenue, especially Highlandtown. Significant Hispanic presence can be seen going in a southeast-ward direction towards Dundalk. Hispanics are starting to act as a medium creating a diverse community wedged between the predominantly black community north of Orleans Street and the predominantly non-Hispanic white community south of Eastern Avenue.

Another noticeable pattern is that Central American Hispanics such as Salvadorans, Hondurans, and Guatemalans, majority of whom are recent immigrants, are more concentrated in inner Southeast neighborhoods west of Linwood Avenue towards Downtown Baltimore, including Upper Fell's Point and Butchers Hill, and SW neighborhoods like Lakewood and Brooklyn. Caribbean Hispanics such as Puerto Ricans and Dominicans, some of whom come from other states like New York and New Jersey, are mostly concentrated in outer Southeast neighborhoods east of Haven Street towards southeastern Baltimore County, including Greektown and Joseph Lee. Mexicans are the most widespread in Southeast Baltimore. Highlandtown, unlike other Baltimore neighborhoods, is known for its diverse mix of Hispanic groups.

== Culture ==
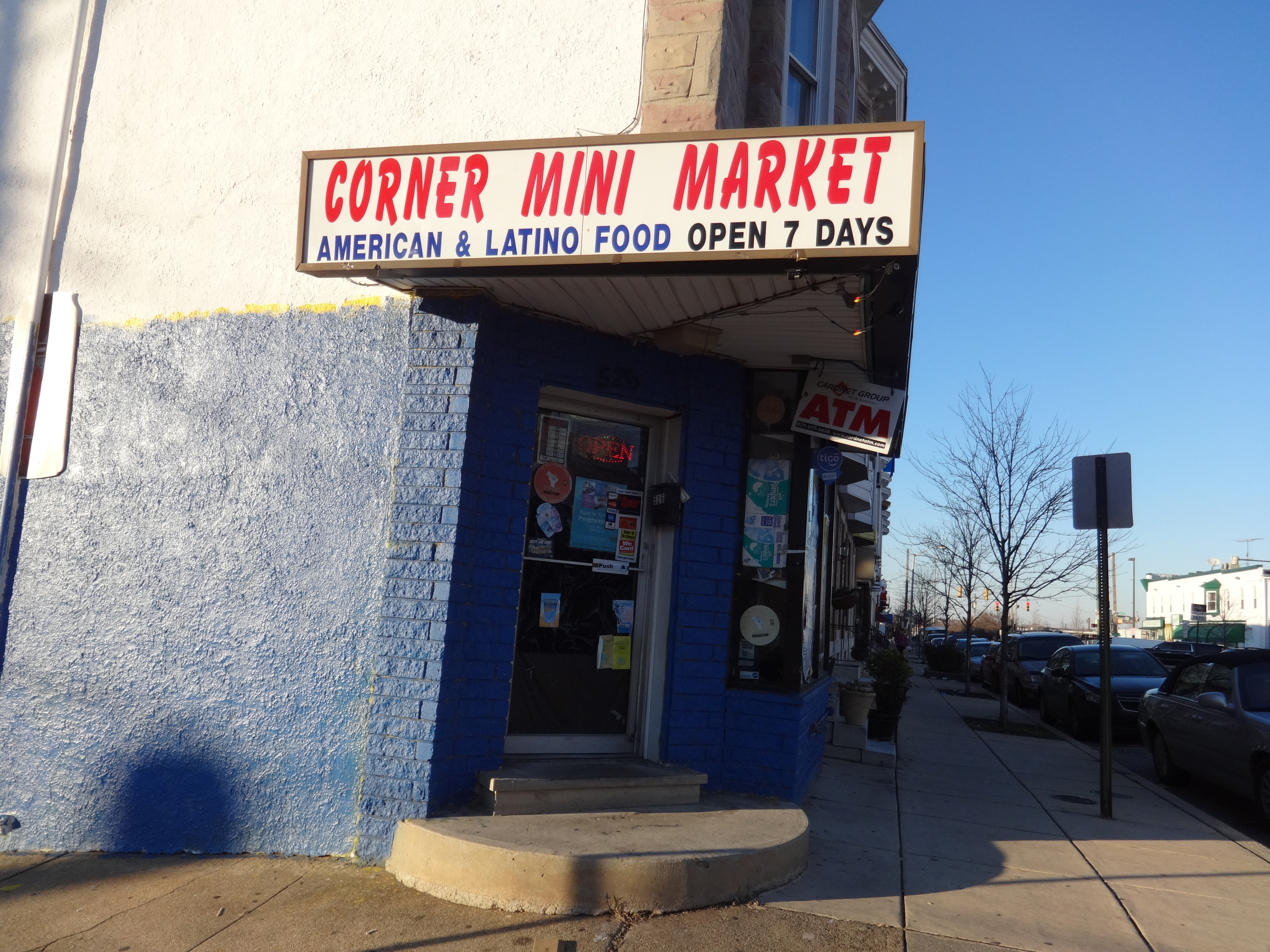
Latino Corner Mini Market, Greektown, December 2014.

LatinoFest is a yearly celebration of the cultures of Central and South America held in Patterson Park. The festival includes arts and crafts, dancing, and traditional folk music.

In East Baltimore there exists a Peruvian-American chapter of the Brotherhood of the Lord of Miracles. The organization holds an annual procession which honors the Lord of Miracles, a painting of Jesus Christ from Lima, Peru. This image is venerated by Peru's Roman Catholics.

While other cities in the Mid-Atlantic and Northeast have thriving Spanish-language media, Baltimore has lagged behind. However, a few media outlets do exist. Latin Opinion/Opinion Latina is a biweekly newspaper written in English and Spanish that has been published since 2004. The newspaper was the first Spanish-language publication in Baltimore. WLZL is the first FM Spanish-language radio station in the city.

Due to a lack of support for gay, lesbian, bisexual, and transgender Latinos in Baltimore, an organization called IRIS (Individuality, Respect, Integrity, and Sexuality) was created in 2016 to cater to the LGBT Latino community of Baltimore. Previous programs directed at LGBT Latinos have come and gone, but IRIS is designed to be more permanent. While most LGBT services in Baltimore are in the gayborhood of Mount Vernon, the majority of Baltimore's LGBT Latinos live in Highlandtown alongside their heterosexual Latino peers. In addition to the problem of location, LGBT Latinos face intersectional barriers to access and equality, including immigration status, language fluency, and cultural acceptance.

In 2019, the Baltimore officials approved using funds to create a Latino community center on Pulaski Highway in East Baltimore. The immigrant rights organization CASA de Maryland is helping renovate the dilapidated Belnord Theater and will use the space to host a legal clinic, educational and after-school programs, and laboratories for teaching construction and medical skills.

== Health ==
Health disparities exist between the Latino and non-Latino populations. Latinos are twice as likely as non-Latinos to say that they have poor or fair health. They often do not have access to medical care and fewer mothers receive prenatal care. Due to lack of coverage, many Latinos rely on community clinics. The Highlandtown Community Health Center has a bilingual staff and provides preventative care and treatment to the Latino community.

== Legal issues ==
Some Latinos distrust the police. Because of this, some will not turn to the police to report crimes they have witnessed, including alleged anti-Latino hate crimes. A common reason for not reporting crimes is fear of deportation or deportation of family.

== Notable Hispanics/Latinos from Baltimore ==
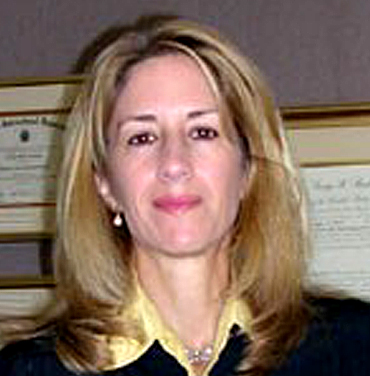
Cecilia Altonaga, a Florida United States district court judge. She is the first Cuban-American woman to be appointed as a federal judge in the United States.

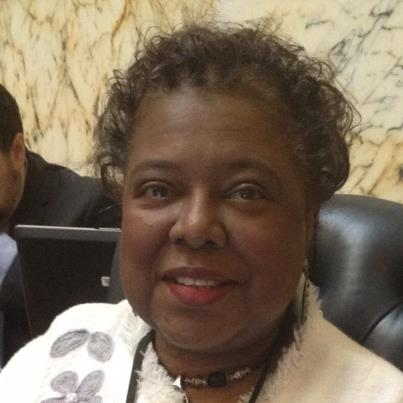
Nina R. Harper, a politician who serves in the Maryland General Assembly representing Maryland's 45th legislative located in northeast Baltimore City.

- Andres Alonso (Cuban-American), the chief executive officer (CEO) of the Baltimore City Public School System from 2007 to 2013.
- Cecilia Altonaga (Cuban-American), a Baltimore-born Florida United States district court judge.
- Rafael Alvarez (Spanish-American), an author based in Baltimore and Los Angeles. (Note: Alvarez is of Italian, Polish, and Spanish descent and was raised in a culturally Polish-American home. Neither he nor his half-Spanish father were raised in a Spanish speaking home. Despite his Spanish ancestry, he does not identify as Hispanic.)
- Manuel Barrueco (Cuban-American), classical guitarist, teacher at the Peabody Institute of the Johns Hopkins University.
- Juan Fernando Bastos, (Bolivian-American) a Venezuelan-born portrait artist who works primarily in painting and drawing.
- Luis Borunda, (Mexican-American) Maryland Deputy Secretary of State, serves in the Hogan Administration
- Jorge Eduardo Castillo (Peruvian-American) Immediate Past Chairman & President of the Maryland Hispanic Chamber of Commerce (2015–2019) and community leader. Currently serving as spokesperson for the Maryland Emergency Management Agency.
- Cristina Gutierrez, a criminal defense attorney who represented several high-profile defendants in the 1990s.
- Nina R. Harper (Colombian-American), a politician who serves in the Maryland General Assembly representing Maryland's 45th legislative located in northeast Baltimore City.
- Martin Koppel (Argentine-American), an Argentine-born leader of the Socialist Workers Party in the United States.
- Estelle Anna Lewis (Cuban-American/Spanish-American), a poet and dramatist.
- Y-Love (Puerto Rican), an Orthodox Jewish hip-hop artist.
- Hector L. Torres, (Puerto Rican) a former Baltimore City Fire Department Battalion Chief and a Maryland Senate candidate.

=== Fictional Hispanics/Latinos from Baltimore ===
- Alma Gutierrez, a fictional character on the HBO drama The Wire, played by actress Michelle Paress.
- Renaldo, fictional character on the HBO drama The Wire, played by Ramon Rodriguez.
- Missy Serrano, fictional character on movie Step Up 2: The Streets, played by Danielle Polanco.

== See also ==
- Ethnic groups in Baltimore
- Hispanics and Latinos in Maryland
- Hispanics and Latinos in Washington, D.C.
- History of Baltimore
