= Greek Orthodox Cathedral of the Annunciation (Baltimore) =

Greek Orthodox Parish in Baltimore, Maryland, U.S.

Coordinates: 39.304472°N 76.617528°W

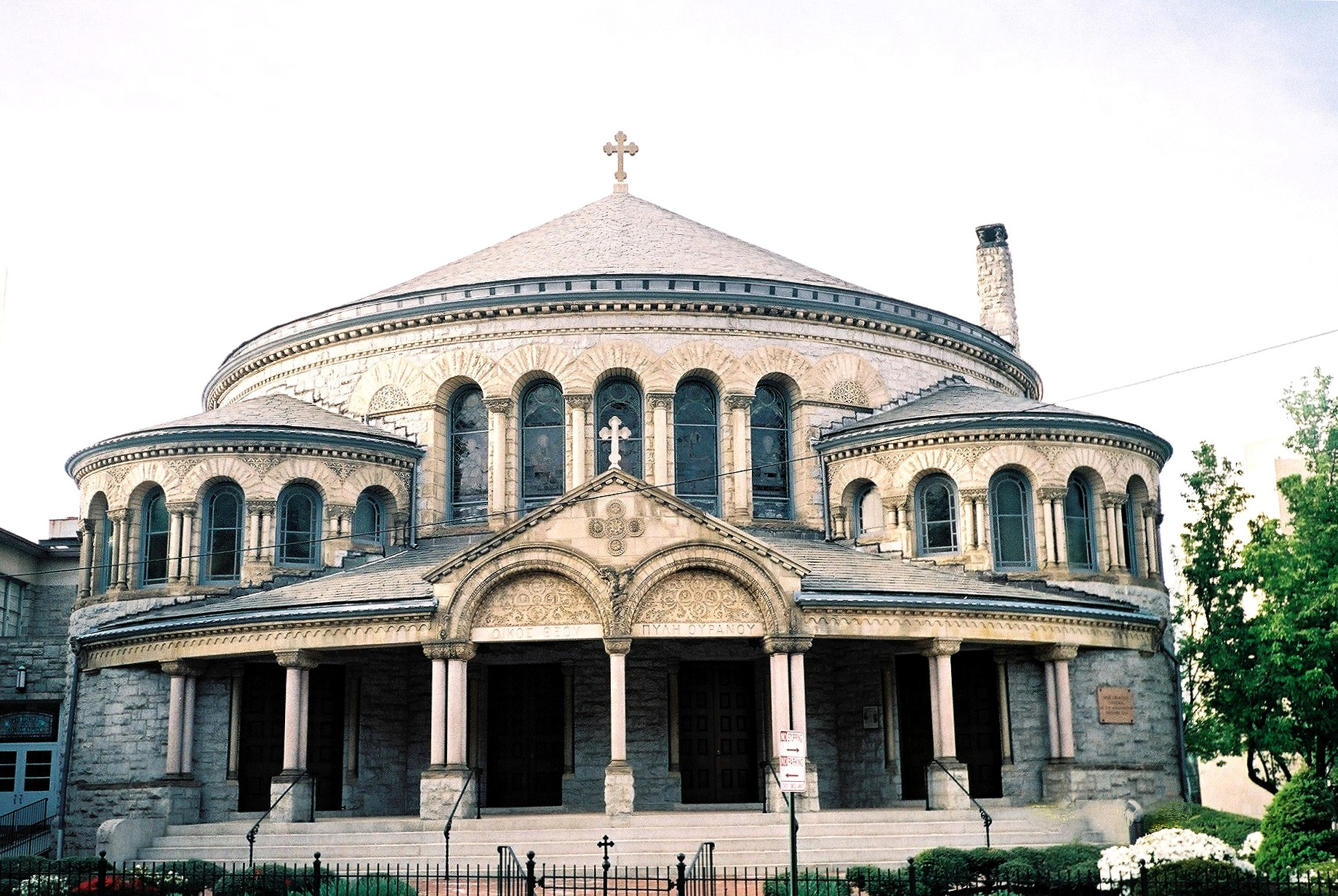

- Location within Baltimore
- Location: 24 W Preston St. Baltimore, Maryland
- Country: United States
- Denomination: Greek Orthodox
- Website: annunciationbaltimore.org

History
- Founded: 1906
- Dedicated: 1937
- Consecrated: 1938

Architecture
- Functional status: Active
- Architect: Charles E. Cassell
- Architectural type: Church
- Style: Neo-Byzantine
- Groundbreaking: 1889
- Completed: 1890
- Construction cost: $100,000

Specifications
- Materials: Granite

The Greek Orthodox Cathedral of the Annunciation, located in Baltimore, Maryland, is a church of the Greek Orthodox Archdiocese of America. Established on March 18, 1906, it is the oldest of the eleven Greek Orthodox parishes in the State of Maryland.

The cathedral has hosted significant Greek American cultural and religious events, including an annual Greek Festival and the 1997 visit of Ecumenical Patriarch Bartholomew of Constantinople.

== History ==
=== Early History ===
In May 1889, the Associate Reformed Church approved plans to construct the Romanesque-style church edifice with Neo-Byzantine elements at the corner of Maryland Avenue and Preston Street. The architect on record was Charles Cassell. The total cost at the time was reported at $100,000. The Baltimore Sun reported that the first church services were held on October 5, 1890.

In 1900, the Associate Reformed Church merged with the First Congregational Church, and it became known as the Associate Congregational Church. The Protestant parish flourished until April 1934, when it downsized and moved to 1311 Bolton Street in Bolton Hill. The Preston Street church remained vacant for three years, later scheduled for demolition to accommodate a new gas station.

The Greek Orthodox community of Baltimore, established in 1906, outgrew their Homewood Avenue parish as the community expanded, requiring larger quarters. In 1937, a Greek Orthodox delegation purchased the vacant Preston Street church for $40,500. They began to remodel the interior to conform to Orthodox traditions.

=== Establishment and Growth (1937–1950s) ===
On April 23, 1937, the Greek Orthodox leaders and congregation held a procession from the Homewood Avenue Church to their new home on Preston Street. The first Divine Liturgy was offered that same day by The Very Rev. Joakim Papachristou, who was assigned to the parish in 1935. Papachristou would serve Annunciation Cathedral for fifteen years as the church grew. On May 8, 1938, the Greek Orthodox Cathedral of the Annunciation was consecrated by Archbishop Athenagoras.

During the 1940s, the parish founded a local Greek War Relief Association, which coordinated war relief efforts for the homeland and the United States after it entered World War II. Annunciation Cathedral also purchased 14 acres of property and established its own burial ground. By the spring of 1944, the Greek Orthodox Cemetery on Windsor Mill Road was complete. In 1954, The Rev. George P. Gallos, the first full-time American-born priest of Greek descent, began his eleven-year pastorate.

=== Expanding the Parish (1960s–1975) ===
The Annunciation Cathedral community also became more involved in interdenominational activities, establishing rapport with churches and institutions in the surrounding areas of the Mt. Vernon neighborhood. To expand its facilities, the original rectory was taken down, and a larger Education and Social Center was constructed using most of the original granite. A dedication ceremony took place in the spring of 1961, officiated by Archbishop Iakovos. The parish is also known for hosting an annual Greek Festival. The Rev. Emmanuel Bouyoucas, who arrived in 1965, conducted the ribbon cutting for the first festival in 1971, called the “Athenian Agora.”

=== Cathedral Era (1975–2000) ===
In March 23, 1975, Annunciation Cathedral was designated as the Greek Orthodox Cathedral for the State of Maryland. The expanded role as a cathedral coincided with the arrival of The Rev. Constantine Monios as the new Cathedral Dean in November 1975.

In the late 1970s, the church acquisition of five townhouses on W. Preston Street, which led to the 1984 construction of the Annunciation Cathedral Orthodox Center. During the 1980s, other capital improvement projects were completed including the Chapel of Holy Wisdom in the Education Building and the Chapel of the Holy Resurrection and mausoleum on the cemetery grounds. In 1982, The Rev. Louis Noplos became assistant priest, serving Annunciation Cathedral for 14 years until departing in the fall of 1996.

The 1990s saw additional restoration of the sanctuary, remodeling of the kitchen, construction of an elevator, and the acquisition of five additional townhouses for future use. In 1992, the Commission for Historical Architectural Preservation bestowed a designation upon the Annunciation Cathedral building. In 1996, parishioner Constantine Moralis was ordained to the Diaconate, and then the Holy Priesthood at Annunciation Cathedral and served as the assistant priest for six years. During this period, Annunciation Cathedral's youth programs were expanded, college campus ministries established, and the parish’s website was officially launched.

On October 23, 1997, the Annunciation Cathedral community hosted the historic visit of Ecumenical Patriarch Bartholomew of Constantinople. On June 21, 2002, Father Monios died at the age of 68.

=== 21st Century (2000–present) ===
Monios' assistant and successor, The Rev. Constantine Moralis, was elevated to the status of Archimandrite on August 4, 2002. Under Moralis' spiritual leadership, the Annunciation Cathedral community continued to expand and opened a bookstore on the lower level of the Education Building in 2004. In March 2006, the church celebrated 100 years of Orthodoxy in the State of Maryland at a Grand Centennial Banquet. In 2007, Parish Historian Nicholas M. Prevas and Annunciation Cathedral published House of God; Gateway to Heaven, a book documenting the parish's history.

Archimandrite Constantine Moralis served as the Presiding Priest of Annunciation Cathedral for two decades until his elevation to the Episcopacy as Bishop Constantine of Sassima in 2022. On October 1, 2022, The Rev. Anastasios Bourantas succeeded Moralis. On October 28, 2023, Deacon John Bullock was ordained to the Holy Priesthood at Annunciation Cathedral.

In 2023, Annunciation Cathedral launched “The Archangel,” a newsletter to share the latest news and events with parishioners.

In January 2024, the Metropolis of New Jersey reassigned Father Bourantas to the St. George Greek Orthodox Cathedral in Philadelphia. On March 1, 2024, The Rev. George Mastakas was appointed as the new Presiding Priest.
