= Patient First =

US urgent care center chain

- Type: Healthcare
- Industry: Healthcare
- Founded: 1981
- Headquarters: Richmond, Virginia, United States
- Number of locations: 80
- Area served: Virginia, Maryland, Pennsylvania, and New Jersey
- Services: Urgent care Primary care Telehealth
- Website: www.patientfirst.com

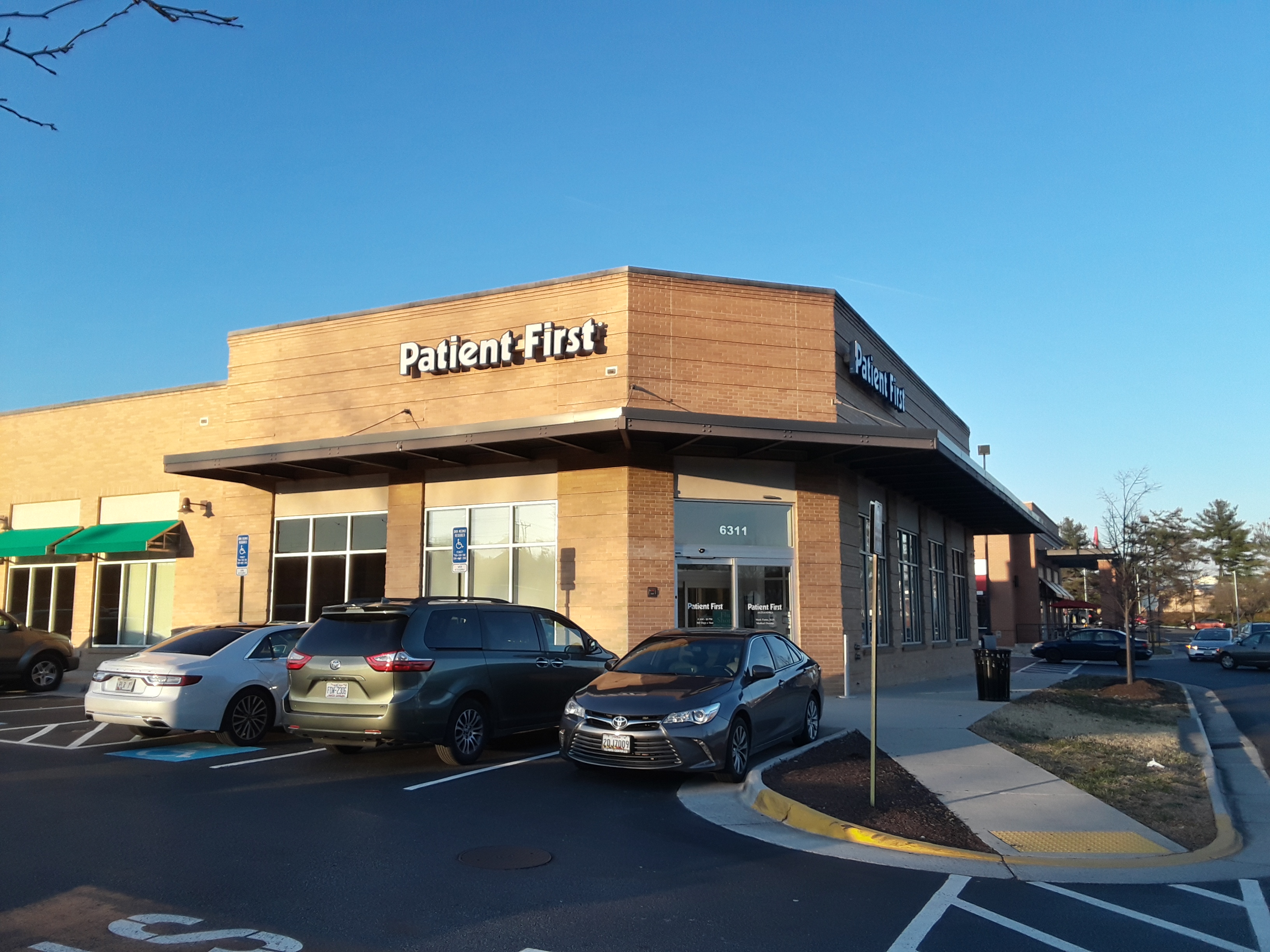
Patient First office in Fairfax County, Virginia, in December 2018

Patient First is a chain of urgent care centers in the United States. The centers allow patients to walk in and receive diagnosis and treatments for common symptoms and ailments that can receive outpatient care without an appointment. The company, which is based in Glen Allen, Virginia, currently has locations in Maryland, Pennsylvania, New Jersey and Virginia.

The company has never been affiliated with other companies that have used the name Patient First in other areas of the United States, nor has it ever been affiliated with FPA Medical Management or US Healthnet.

== History ==
Patient First was established in 1981, and currently has 80 locations in Virginia, Maryland, Pennsylvania, and New Jersey.

Patient First is a privately owned company that has never been affiliated with FPA Medical Management or USA Healthnet. Majority of insurance plans are accepted at Patient First for walk-in patients.
