= Upper Fells Point =

Upper Fells Point Fell's Prospect
- Neighborhood of Baltimore
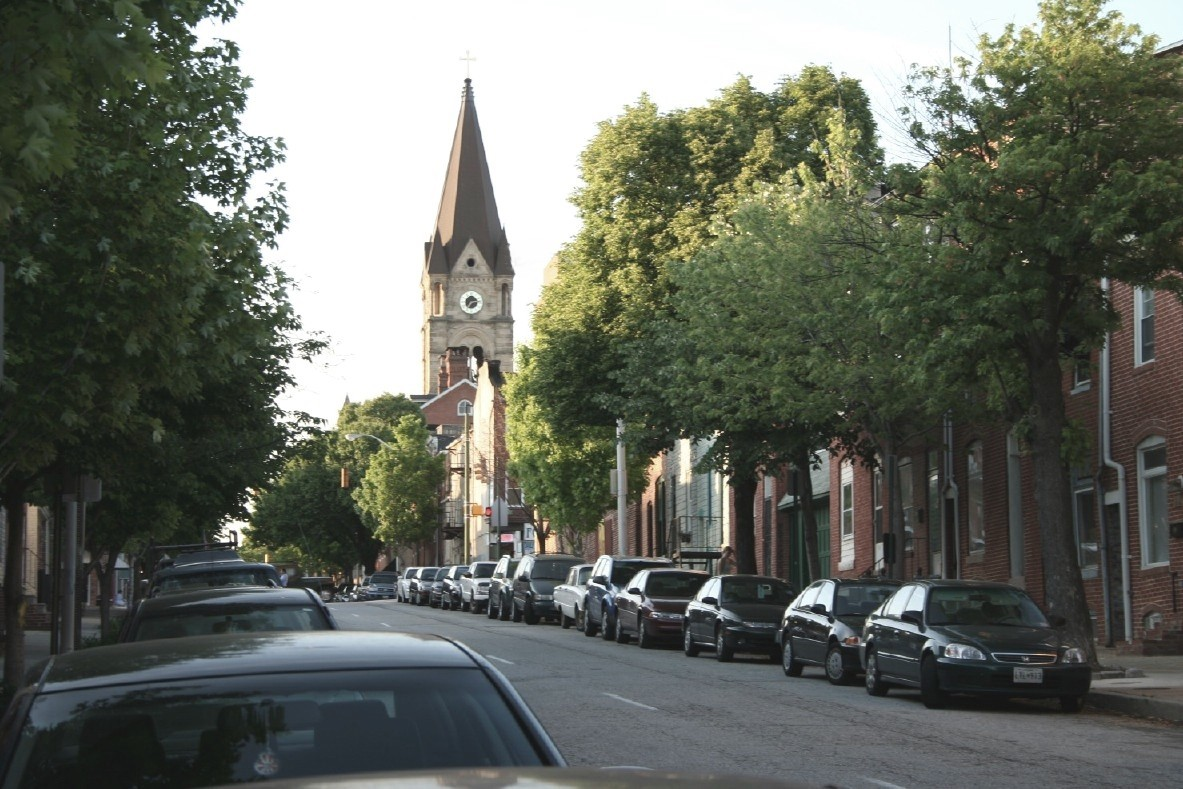
- Looking north on S. Wolfe Street in Upper Fells Point.
- Nicknames: Upper Fell's, Spanishtown
- Interactive map of Upper Fells Point; Fell's Prospect
- Coordinates: 39°17′19″N 76°35′16″W
- Country: United States
- State: Maryland
- City: Baltimore
- Time zone: UTC-5 (Eastern)
  - Summer (DST): EDT
- ZIP code: 21231
- Area code: 410, 443, and 667
- Upper Fells Point Historic District
- U.S. National Register of Historic Places
- U.S. Historic district
- Location within Baltimore Location within Maryland Location within the United States
- Location: Roughly bounded by E Baltimore St.; S Chapel St.; E Pratt St.; S Patterson Park Ave.; S Chester, Gough & S Bethel Sts.
- Area: 50 acres (20 ha)
- Architectural style: Federal
- NRHP reference No.: 07001034
- Added to NRHP: December 20, 2007

Upper Fells Point, also known as "Fells Prospect," is a neighborhood of Baltimore, Maryland, United States. Located north of Fells Point, originally the neighborhood was home to Baltimore's dock workers. By the 1880s canneries and factories provided employment to new immigrants, including Irish, Italians and Poles. In the early 1900s these new Americans were joined by Jews, Lithuanians and Greeks. Today its tidy brick rowhouses and tree-lined streets are home to both old-timers and young urban professionals. It is also the heart of Baltimore's growing Latino community and is sometimes called "Spanish Town". Although most Hispanics in the neighborhood are Mexicans, there are significant populations of Salvadorans, Puerto Ricans, Hondurans, Dominicans, Guatemalans, Colombians, and Cubans, as well as many others.

It is bordered by S. Broadway on the west, S. Patterson Park Avenue on the east, E. Lombard Street on the north and Eastern Avenue on the south, Upper Fells Point's central location puts residents within walking distance of Patterson Park, the dining and nightlife of Fells Point, Little Italy and Canton, and Johns Hopkins Hospital. It is also just a water taxi ride from Baltimore's Inner Harbor as well as Federal Hill.

In 2006 the Baltimore City Paper selected Upper Fells Point as Baltimore's Best Neighborhood.

The neighborhood was placed on the National Register of Historic Places on December 21, 2007. It is within Baltimore National Heritage Area.

== History ==
The name "Fell's Prospect" derives from the name given to the area in 1730 by an English Quaker, William Fell, who bought land on a marshy hook that jutted into the Patapsco River. He called his tract of land "Fell's Prospect," sensing the Point's possibilities for shipping and shipbuilding. The river offered a deep-water anchorage, which enabled seagoing vessels to send smaller boats back and forth from shore with cargo.

In 1797 Fells Point was incorporated into Baltimore town as the Debtor Hundred, a parcel of land that included all the Fell family holdings, both the Point and the higher ground to the north then known as Fells Prospect, often referred to as Upper Fells Point.

Fells Point was largely responsible for shaping the ethnic character of Upper Fells as it exists today. The first wave of immigrants were the Irish, establishing the second Catholic Church in Baltimore, St. Patrick's, in 1792. A few years later, this was the site of the first free school in Baltimore. It was academically rigorous and admitted poor children of all races and religions. The Irish and African-Americans lived side by side with the newer German immigrants.

By 1860, one quarter of the population of Baltimore was German. By the 1880s East Baltimore canneries and clothing sweatshops were providing employment to hordes of newcomers. Czechs from Bohemia, Scandinavians, Italians, and Poles found work and lodging in Upper Fells Point. These groups were joined by the Lithuanians and Greeks in the early 1900s. The Depression caused many of the larger homes in the area to be divided into multi-family dwellings. Adding to the neighborhood's ethnic diversity are Hispanic immigrants who began to arrive in the 1960s and 1970s and Lumbee Native Americans who migrated from the Carolinas.

== Population ==
In the 2020 Census, Upper Fells Point was 69.6% white, 18.2% Hispanic, 4.4% African American, and 5.7% Asian. 9.6% of residents identified as being two or more races. The neighborhood had a total 3,959 residents, a 3% population increase from the 2010 census.
