= Highlandtown, Baltimore =

- Patterson Park-Highlandtown Historic District
- U.S. National Register of Historic Places
- U.S. Historic district
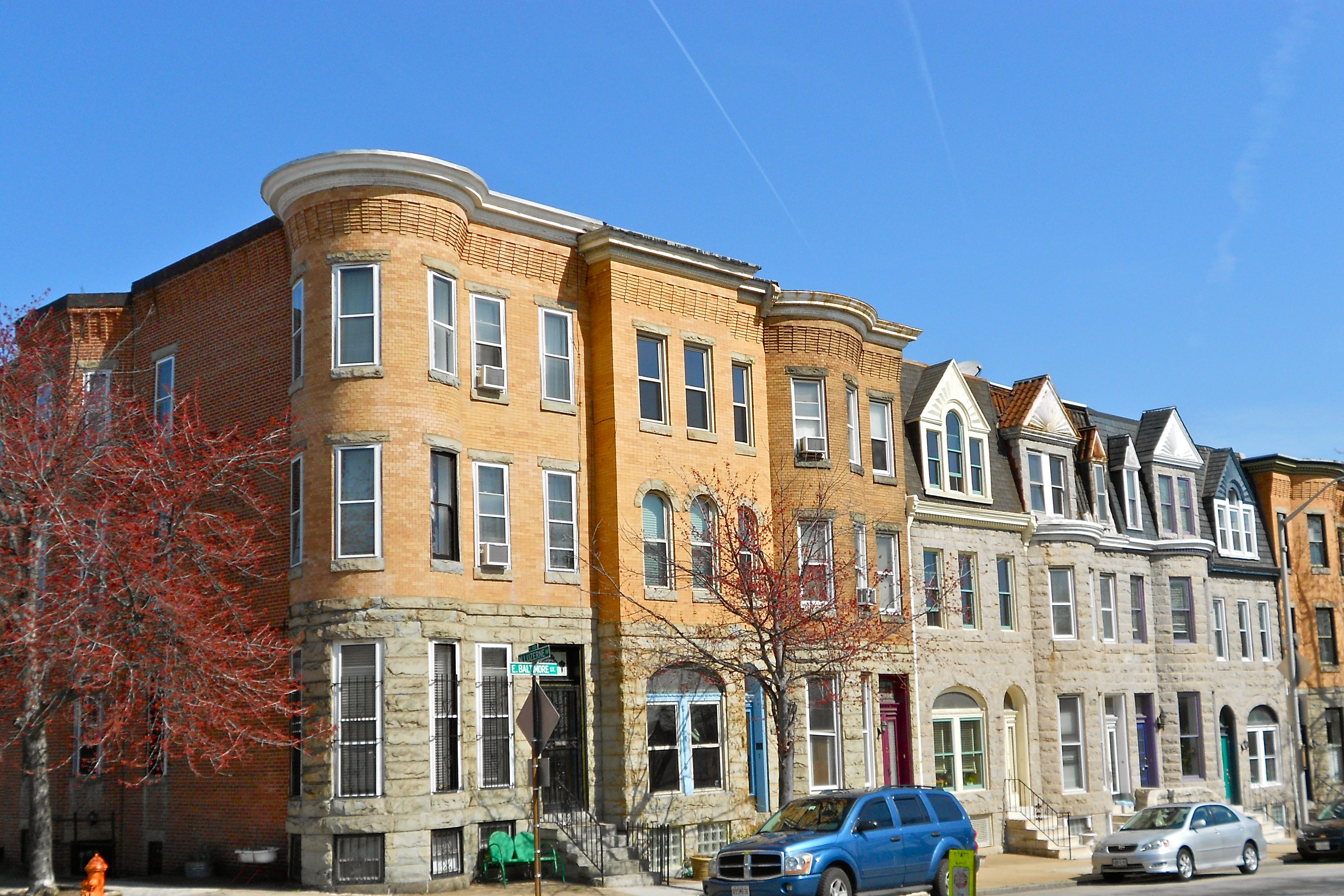
- Northeast corner of Baltimore Street and Luzerne Avenue

- Location within Baltimore
- Location: Roughly bounded by Patterson Park Ave., E. Fayette St., and Pulaski Hwy, Grundy St., Eastern Ave., Patterson Park, Baltimore, Maryland
- Coordinates: 39°17′30″N 76°34′23″W
- Area: 295 acres (119 ha)
- Built: 1867
- Architect: Gallagher, Edward J.; et al.
- Architectural style: Late Victorian, Late 19th And 20th Century Revivals
- NRHP reference No.: 02001623
- Added to NRHP: December 27, 2002

Highlandtown is a neighborhood of Baltimore, Maryland, United States.

== Description and history ==
The area was the former location of the Civil War Fort Marshall, which was abandoned after the war. It was on Murray Hill, near Eastern and Highland Avenues.

Highlandtown was established in 1866, when the area known as "Snake Hill" was established as a village outside the Baltimore city limits. The first settlers of the community were primarily German Americans. In 1870, residents renamed the neighborhood "Highland Town" because of the views it offered over the city. The neighborhood was made part of Baltimore City in 1919.

The neighborhood today is bounded by Haven Street to the east, Baltimore Street to the north, Linwood Avenue to the west, and Eastern Avenue to the south. The long stretch of Eastern Avenue that runs through the neighborhood is notable as the Highlandtown's main commercial thoroughfare. The area was designated as a "Main Street District" by a previous mayor Martin O'Malley, seeking to promote commercial revitalization through economic incentives from the National Main Street Program.

Highlandtown is one of Baltimore's traditional blue-collar neighborhoods, and for this reason was designated as part of the Patterson Park/Highlandtown Historic District in the National Register of Historic Places. In Baltimorese the neighborhood is pronounced "Hollantown". Historically one of the city's main commercial and industrial hubs, the neighborhood suffered a period of decline beginning in the 1970s as the manufacturing sector declined and department stores were replaced by shopping malls.

Highlandtown was once known as a "Little Appalachia" or a "hillbilly ghetto." Before, during, and after World War II many Appalachian migrants settled in Baltimore, including in Highlandtown. Appalachian people who migrated to Highlandtown were largely economic migrants who came looking for work.

Modern Highlandtown is in transition. The German, Polish, Czech, Italian, Irish, Greek, and Ukrainian population are being augmented with a growing Latino community. The headquarters of the Baltimore Science Fiction Society can be found on the northern edge of Highlandtown.

Former United States Senator Barbara Mikulski grew up in Highlandtown.

The easternmost eight blocks are occupied by parallel-running north–south streets that start with consecutive letters of the alphabet, from B to H: Baylis, Conkling, Dean, Eaton, Fagley, Grundy and Haven. This scheme continues in Greektown to the east, and resets at Bayview.

== Demographics ==
As of the census of 2010, there were 7,820 people living in the neighborhood. The racial makeup of Highlandtown was 42.3% white, 34% Hispanic, 19.7% African American, and 5% all other (Asians, Native Americans etc.). Most of the Hispanic population consist of Mexicans, Puerto Ricans, Salvadorans, Dominicans, Hondurans, Nicaraguans, Cubans, and Colombians, among others. 59.8% of occupied housing units were owner-occupied. 15.5% of housing units were vacant.

52.0% of the population were employed, 5.0% were unemployed, and 42.7% were not in the labor force. The median household income was $28,813. About 14.8% of families and 22.6% of the population were below the poverty line.

== See also ==
Highlandtown Arts District

== External sources ==
- Healthy Neighborhoods: Southeast Baltimore
- Highlandtown Community Association
- Southeast Community Development Corporation
- Greetings from Highlandtown
- Highlandtown Arts
- National Main Street Program
- Demographics from Neighborhood Indicators Alliance
- Patterson Park-Highlandtown Historic District, Baltimore City, including undated photo and boundary map, at Maryland Historical Trust
- Patterson Park/Highlandtown listing at CHAP includes map
