= History of Native Americans in Baltimore =

The history of Native Americans in Baltimore and what is now Baltimore dates back at least 12,000 years. As of 2014, Baltimore is home to a small Native American population, centered in East Baltimore. The majority of citizens of federally recognized tribes living in Baltimore belong to the Cherokee and Lumbee peoples. The Cherokee and Lumbee are Indigenous to North Carolina and neighboring states of the Southeastern United States. Many of the Cherokee and Lumbee migrated to Baltimore during the mid-20th century along with other migrants from the Southern United States, such as African-Americans and white Appalachians. The Eastern Band of Cherokee Indians in North Carolina are a federally recognized tribe. In 2026, the Lumbee Tribe of North Carolina was granted federal recognition as a tribe by an act of Congress that was signed by President Donald Trump. There are three state-recognized tribes in Maryland; the Piscataway-Conoy Tribe of Maryland, the Piscataway Indian Nation and Tayac Territory, and the Accohannock Indian Tribe, none of which have historic roots in Baltimore. Maryland has no federally recognized tribes, but consults with tribes with historic ties to Maryland, including several Iroquois tribes, two of the three Lenape tribes, and all three Shawnee tribes.

== Demographics ==
As of the 2000 United States census, there were 6,976 Native Americans in the Baltimore metropolitan area, making up 0.3% of the area's population.

In 2013, 370 Cherokee people and 87 Navajo people lived in Baltimore city, 0.1% and 0.0% of the population respectively. No residents of Baltimore were Chippewa or Sioux.

As of September 2014, speakers of Native American languages were the twenty-seventh largest group of language speakers in Baltimore.

== Early history ==
The Baltimore area had been inhabited by Native Americans since at least the 10th millennium BC, when Paleo-Indians first settled in the region. One Paleo-Indian site and several Archaic period and Woodland period archaeological sites have been identified in Baltimore, including four from the Late Woodland period. During the Late Woodland period, the archaeological culture that is called the "Potomac Creek complex" resided in the area from Baltimore to the Rappahannock River in Virginia, primarily along the Potomac River downstream from the Fall Line.

== Early colonization ==
In the early 1600s, the immediate Baltimore vicinity was sparsely populated, if at all, by Native Americans. The Baltimore County area northward was used as hunting grounds by the Susquehannocks living in the lower Susquehanna River valley who "controlled all of the upper tributaries of the Chesapeake" but "refrained from much contact with Powhatan in the Potomac region." Pressured by the Susquehannocks, the Piscataway tribe of Algonquians stayed well south of the Baltimore area and inhabited primarily the north bank of the Potomac River in what is now Charles and southern Prince George's south of the Fall Line as depicted on John Smith's 1608 map which faithfully mapped settlements, mapped none in the Baltimore vicinity, while noting a dozen Patuxent River settlements that were under some degree of Piscataway suzerainty.

In 1608, Captain John Smith traveled 210 miles from Jamestown to the uppermost Chesapeake Bay, leading the first European expedition to the Patapsco River, a word used by the Algonquin language natives who fished shellfish and hunted. The name "Patapsco" is derived from pota-psk-ut, which translates to "backwater" or "tide covered with froth" in Algonquian dialect. The Chesapeake Bay was named after the Chesapeake tribe of Virginia. "Chesapeake" is derived from the Algonquian word Chesepiooc referring to a village "at a big river." It is the seventh oldest surviving English place-name in the U.S., first applied as "Chesepiook" by explorers heading north from the Roanoke Colony into a Chesapeake tributary in 1585 or 1586.

In 2005, Algonquian linguist Blair A. Rudes "helped to dispel one of the area's most widely held beliefs: that 'Chesapeake' means something like 'Great Shellfish Bay.' It does not, Rudes said. The name might actually mean something like 'Great Water,' or it might have been just a village at the bay's mouth." Soon after John Smith's voyage, English colonists began to settle in Maryland. The English were initially frightened by the Piscataway because of their body paint and war regalia, even though they were a peaceful tribe. The chief of the Piscataway was quick to grant the English permission to settle within Piscataway territory and cordial relations were established between the English and the Piscataway.

Beginning in the 1620s, English settlers from the Colony of Virginia began to trade with the Algonquians, in particular the Piscataway tribe of Southern Maryland. Because the northern part of the Chesapeake Bay area had more trees, there were also more beavers. The colonists from Virginia traded English cloth and metal tools in exchange for beaver pelts. This trade was supported by Lord Baltimore, who felt that more revenue could be gained from taxation of the fur trade than from tobacco farming. Lord Baltimore also wanted to maintain friendly relations with the native Algonquians in order to create a buffer from the Susquehannock, an Iroquoian-speaking tribe to the north that was hostile to the English presence. In exchange for cooperation with the English colonists, tribes on the Eastern Shore of the United States were given grants from English proprietors that protected their lands. The tribes paid for the grants by exchanging beaver belts.

A number of English fur traders help pay the rents for Native Americans in order to prevent tobacco farmers from driving Native Americans off of their lands. Nonetheless, English tobacco farmers gradually acquired more and more land from Native Americans, which hindered Native Americans from moving around freely in search of food. While the English had established treaties with Native Americans that protected their rights to "hunting, fowling, crabbing, and fishing", in practice the English did not respect the treaties and Native Americans were eventually moved to reservations.

In 1642, the Province of Maryland declared war on several Native American groups, including the Susquehannocks. The Susquehannocks were armed with guns they had received from Swedish colonists in the settlement of New Sweden. The Swedes were friendly with the Susquehannock and wanted to maintain a trading relationship, in addition to wanting to prevent the English from expanding their presence further into Delaware. With the assistance of the Swedes, the Susquehannock defeated the English in 1644. On July 5 of 1652, the Susquehannock signed a treaty with the colonists and ceded large tracts of land to the colony. The tribe had suffered a recent loss in a war with the Iroquois, and could not maintain two wars at once. Because both the Susquehannock and the English considered the Iroquois to be their enemy, they decided to cooperate to prevent Iroquois expansion into their territories. This alliance between the Susquehannock and the English lasted for 20 years. However, the English badly treated their Susquehannock allies. In 1674, the English forced the Susquehannock to relocate to the shores of the Potomac River.

== Modern history ==
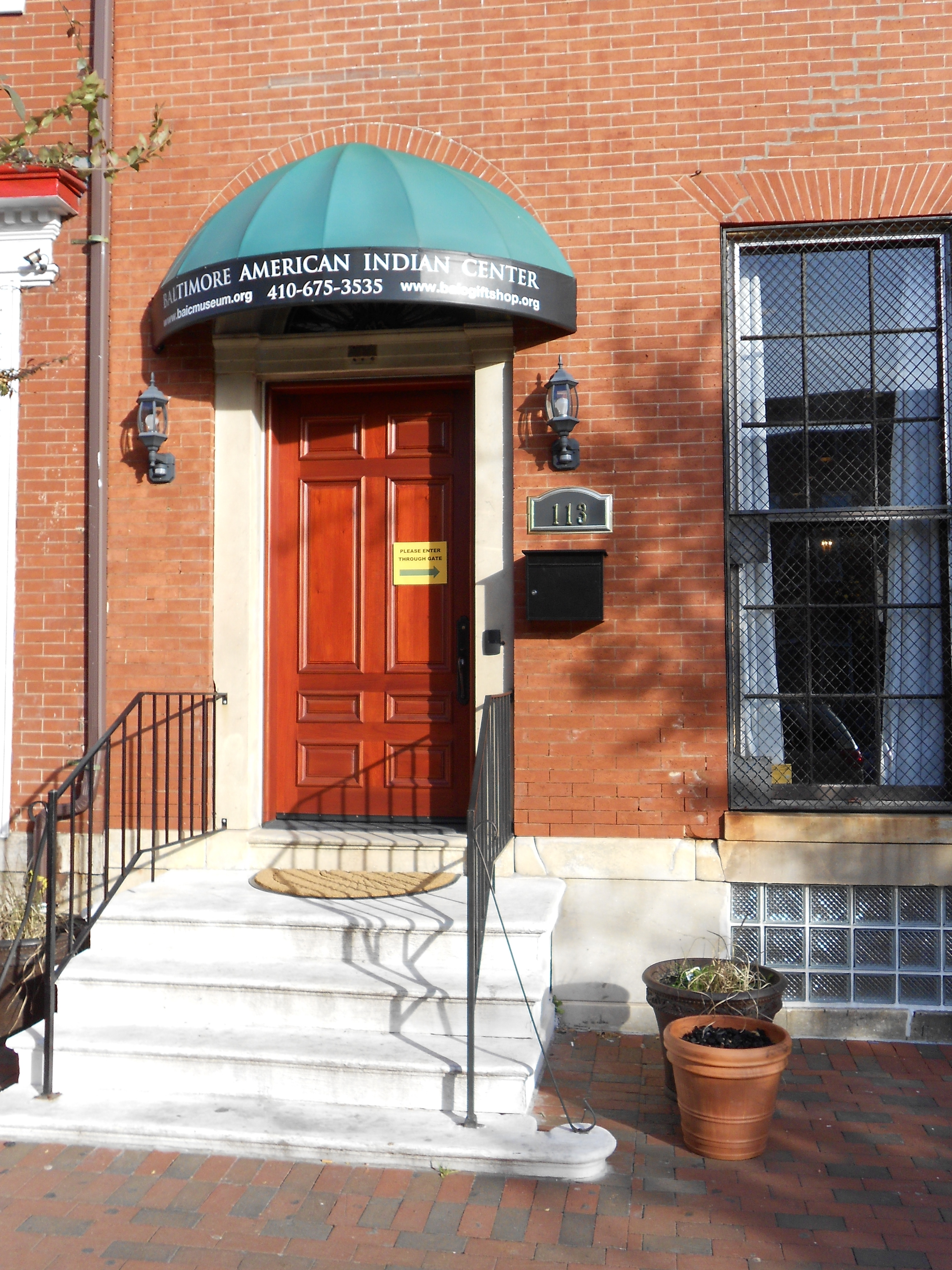
Baltimore American Indian Center viewed from the street, 2011.

The Lumbee are originally from North Carolina, where they are concentrated in Robeson County. The Lumbee are recognized as the Lumbee Tribe of North Carolina by the state of North Carolina, but do not have federal recognition. During the early and mid-20th century, the same wave of migration that brought large numbers of African Americans from the Deep South and poor white people from Appalachia also brought many people from the Lumbee tribe. The Baltimore American Indian Center was established in 1968 in order to serve the needs of this community. In 2011 the center established a Native American heritage museum, including exhibits on Lumbee art and culture. The urban Lumbee and other Native Americans in Baltimore are concentrated in the 6 blocks around Baltimore Street in East Baltimore. This community is the largest Lumbee community outside of the Lumbee's tribal territory. As of 1993 there were 4,300 Lumbee in Maryland, 2,500 of whom resided in Baltimore between Fleet and Fayette streets, Broadway and Milton Avenue. At the time, the South Baltimore Baptist Church at 211 S. Broadway had a congregation that was approximately 95% Lumbee. The Lumbee tend to be poor. Native Americans in Baltimore, the vast majority of whom are Lumbee, have the lowest income level of any ethnic or racial group, including white people, African-Americans, Asians, and Hispanics. High levels of unemployment, drug and alcohol abuse, and domestic violence are problems that plague the community. Over a third fall below the poverty line and the average Lumbee only has an eighth grade level education.

In 2017, Native American activists in Baltimore urged the city council to replace Columbus Day with Indigenous Peoples' Day. The Baltimore American Indian Center co-hosts an Indigenous Peoples' Day event. Bills to replace Columbus Day have so far been unable to pass the Baltimore City Council. In August 2017, a monument to Christopher Columbus was vandalized. The unidentified vandals declared the monument to be racist and denounced "European capitalism" and claimed that Christopher Columbus symbolizes "terrorism, murder, genocide, rape, slavery, ecological degradation and capitalist exploitation" directed against Native Americans and African Americans.

The Johns Hopkins Bloomberg School of Public Health have a land acknowledgement which states that the institution is located on "unceded lands of the Piscataway and Susquehannock peoples" and which recognizes "the enduring presence of more than 7,000 indigenous peoples in Baltimore City, including the Piscataway, Lumbee, and Eastern Band of Cherokee community members." The statement also states that the institution acknowledges "the history of genocide and ongoing systemic inequities while respecting treaties made on this territory..." so that the university community can be held "accountable to tribal nations."

== Notable Native Americans from Baltimore ==
- Shan Goshorn, an Eastern Band Cherokee artist.
- Trembling Earth, Yankton Dakota chief who died in Baltimore.

== See also ==
- Ethnic groups in Baltimore
- History of Baltimore
