= Greektown, Baltimore =

Greektown
- Neighborhood of Baltimore
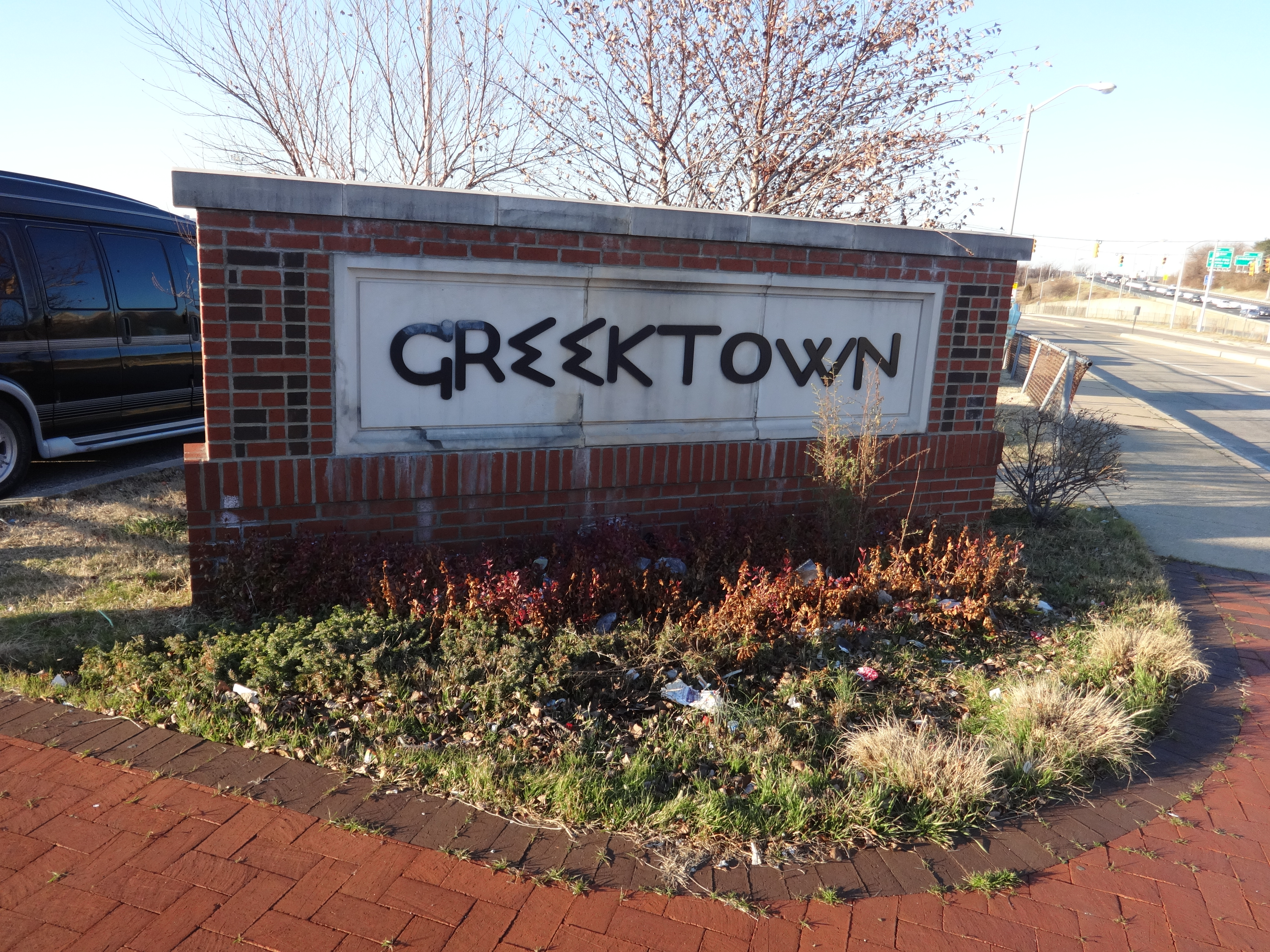
- Sign for Greektown, December 2014.

- Location within Baltimore
- Coordinates: 39°17′07″N 76°33′07″W
- Country: United States
- State: Maryland
- City: Baltimore
- Named after: Greek-American ethnic heritage

Greektown is a neighborhood located in Baltimore, Maryland, United States.

The neighborhood is bounded by Lombard Street to the north, O'Donnell Street to the south, South Haven to the west, and I-895 to the east. A long stretch of Eastern Avenue runs through the neighborhood.

== Demographics ==
In 2014 Greektown was home to around 600 families. During the neighborhood's peak there were around 1,000 families.

== History ==
Greektown has been home to a thriving Greek American community since the 1930s. Once known simply as The Hill, during the 1980s its residents petitioned the Baltimore City Council to change the name of the neighborhood to Greektown.

A bridge shot in the Barry Levinson film Diner (at the 21:51 mark) was filmed at Fleet Street and South Newkirk Street, with the Crown Cork and Seal building appearing in the background.

Greektown underwent a revitalization effort beginning in 2001.

== Today ==
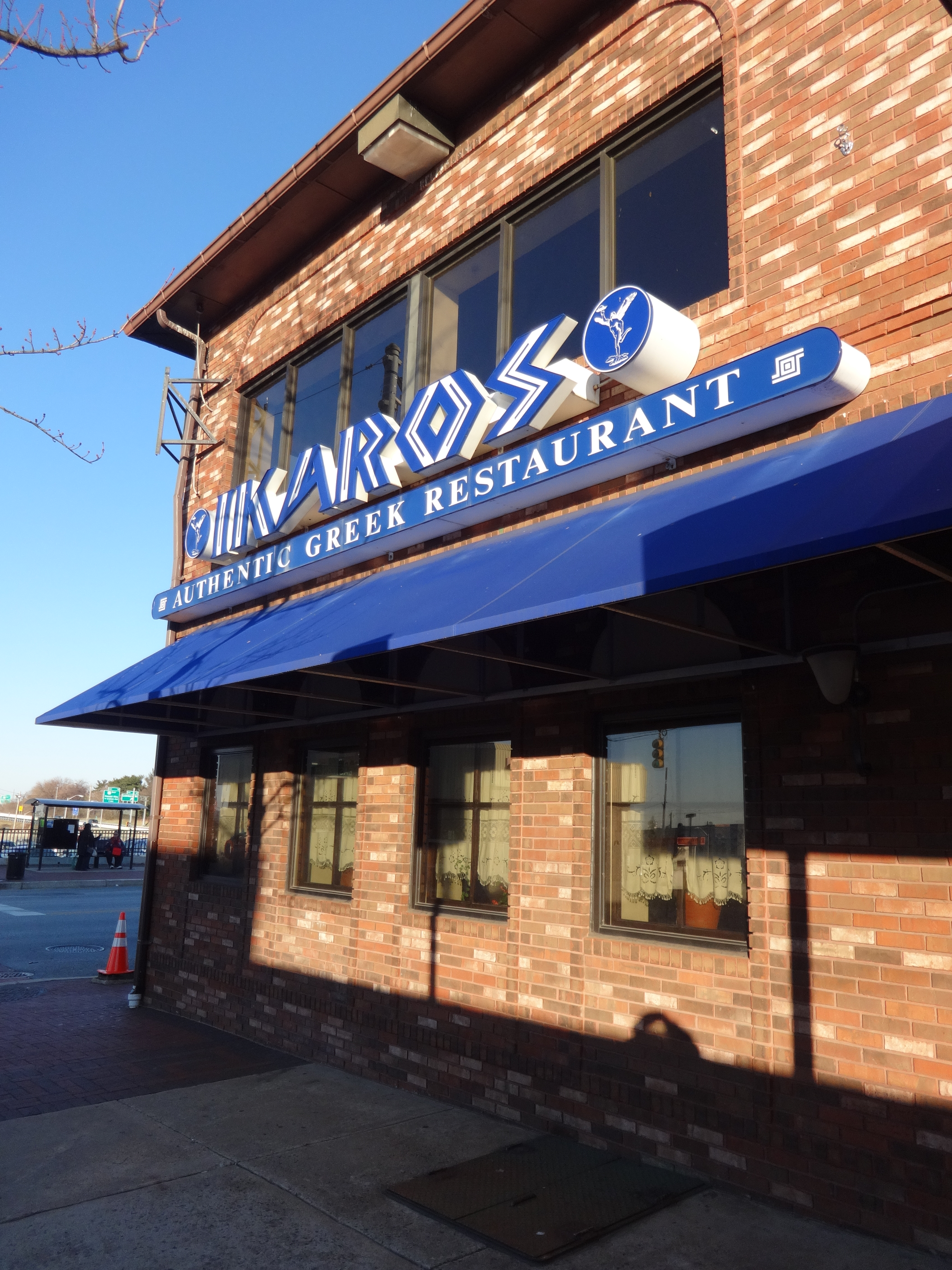
Ikaros Authentic Greek Restaurant, December 2014

As of 2010, Greektown is about 50.9% white, 22% Hispanic, 17.8% African American, 6.3% Asian, and about 3% all other. A thriving self-contained residential and business community consisting of single family town houses, Greektown is noted for its many restaurants, authentic Greek coffee houses, bakeries and small businesses of many types. It is a diverse community of largely blue-collar people of numerous ethnic derivations. Greektown is mostly Greek and other European descendants, but also includes large numbers of people of Native American, Asian, African-American and Hispanic (particularly Puerto Ricans, Mexicans, Dominicans, and smaller numbers of Guatemalans and Salvadorans) ancestry living in a low crime environment. The Greektown Community Development Corporation was formed to revitalize Greek town by The St Nicholas Church. The 1000 member church parish council unanimously voted to appoint Col John E Gavrilis as its first Executive Director. Under his leadership a strategic plan to revitalize the community was published. The plan was near completed to include the revitalization of the Pemco property.

The neighborhood is home to many Greek restaurants and to the Saint Nicholas Greek Orthodox Church. It is home to the annual Baltimore Greek Festival and Parade.

Continuing the consecutive-alphabet scheme that originates in Highlandtown to the west, the north–south streets in this area are: Lehigh, Macon, Newkirk, Oldham, Ponca, Quail, Rappolla, Savage, Tolna, and Umbra.

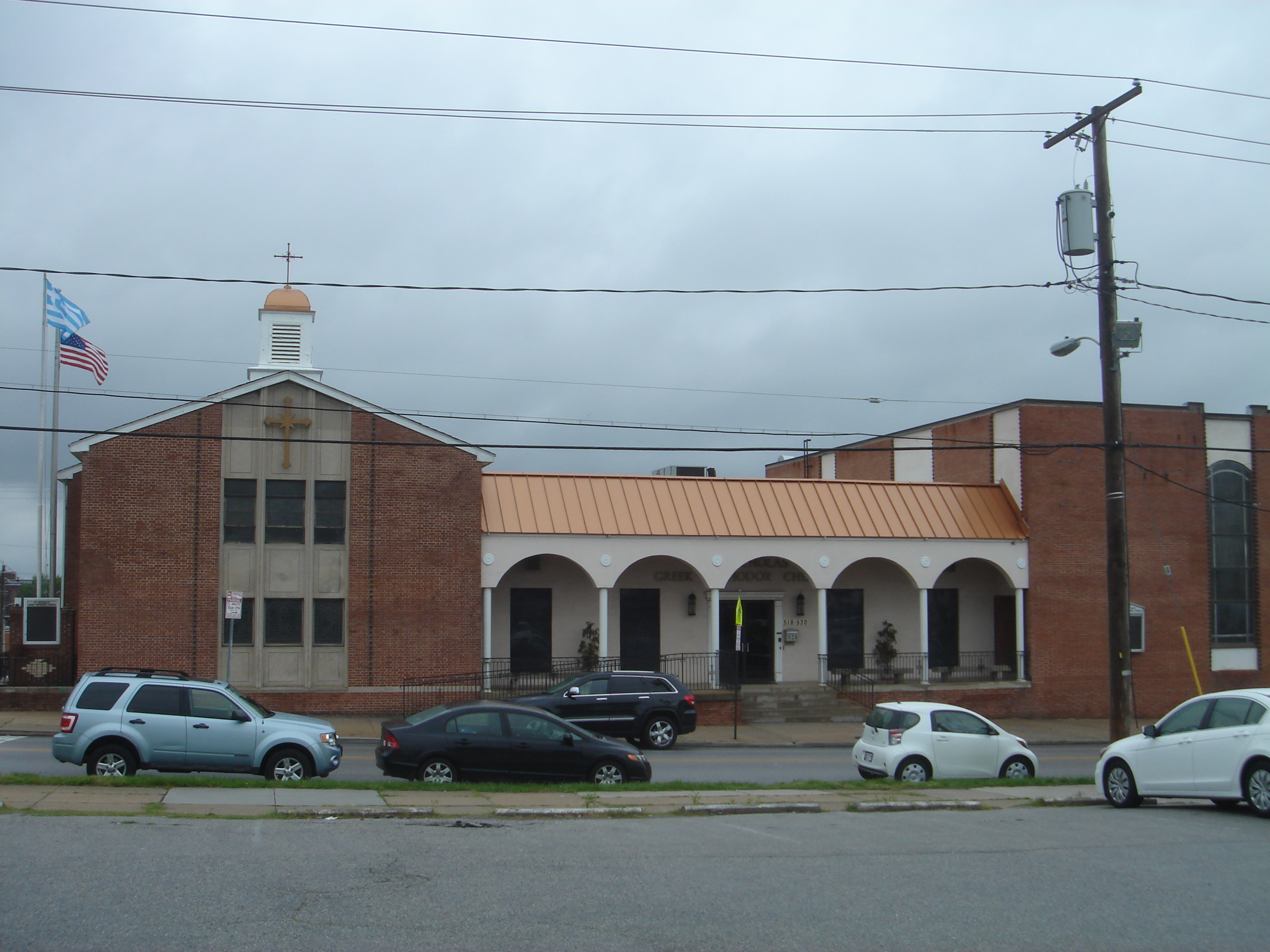
St. Nicholas Greek Orthodox Church, April 2013

The neighborhood is served by Dr. John Ruhrah Elementary Middle School, a city-designated landmark building, built in 1930.

== Notable residents ==
- Stavros Halkias, comedian

== See also ==
- History of the Greeks in Baltimore
