= Italian-American communities of the United States =

Top ancestry by U.S. county. Dark blue indicates counties where persons of Italian ancestry form a plurality.

Little Italies were, to a considerable extent, the result of Italophobia. The ethnocentrism and anti-Catholicism exhibited by the earlier Anglo-Saxon and northern European settlers helped to create an ideological foundation for fixing foreignness on urban spaces occupied by immigrants. Communities of Italian Americans were established in most major industrial cities of the early 20th century. New Orleans, Louisiana was the first site of immigration of Italians into America in the 19th century, before Italy was a unified nation-state. This was before New York Harbor and Baltimore became the preferred destinations for Italian immigrants. In sharp contrast to the Northeast, most of the Southern states (with the exception of Central and South Florida and the New Orleans area) have relatively few Italian-American residents. During the labor shortage in the 19th and early 20th centuries, planters in the Deep South did attract some Italian immigrants to work as sharecroppers, but they soon left the extreme anti-Italian discrimination and strict regimen of the rural areas for the cities or other states. The state of California has had Italian-American residents since the 1850s. By the 1970s, gentrification of inner city neighborhoods and the arrival of new immigrant groups caused a sharp decline in the old Italian-American and other ethnic enclaves. Many Italian Americans moved to the rapidly growing Western states. Today, New York and New Jersey have the largest numbers of Italian Americans in the U.S. while smaller Northeastern cities such as Pittsburgh, Providence and Hartford have the highest percentage of Italian Americans in their metropolitan areas.

The New York-based daily newspaper Il Progresso Italo-Americano had a national audience and reflected the views of the leadership of the community. It was published 1880–1988.

== New York City ==
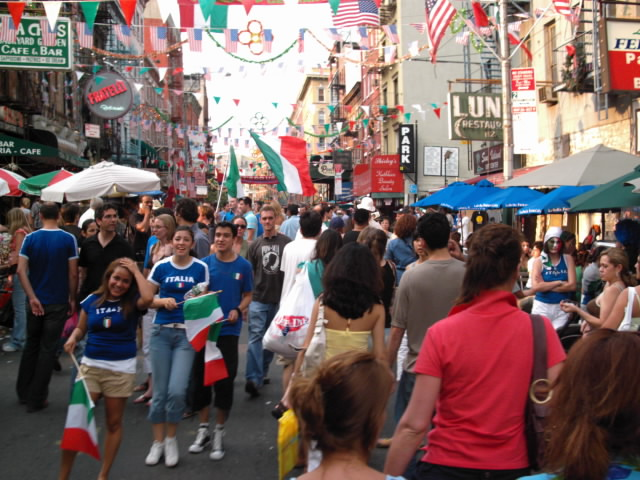
Little Italy in Manhattan after Italy won the 2006 FIFA World Cup

New York City is home to the largest Italian-American population in the country and the second-largest Italian population outside of Italy. Several Little Italy enclaves exist in New York City, including Little Italy, Manhattan; the Lower East Side in general; Italian Harlem, Morris Park, Belmont, Bensonhurst, Howard Beach, Ozone Park, Carroll Gardens, Greenwich Village, Middle Village, Italian Williamsburg, Bay Ridge, and the South Shore of Staten Island. Historically, Little Italy on Mulberry Street in Manhattan extends as far south as Canal Street, as far north as Bleecker, as far west as Lafayette and as far east as the Bowery. The neighborhood was once known for its large population of Italians. Today, it consists of Italian stores and restaurants. The Italian immigrants congregated along Mulberry Street in Manhattan's Little Italy to celebrate San Gennaro with a large street fair, lasting 11 days, that takes place every September. Today, much of the neighborhood has been absorbed and engulfed by Chinatown, as immigrants from China moved to the area.

Arthur Avenue in the Belmont section of New York City's northernmost borough, The Bronx, is one of the many neighborhoods considered the Bronx's "Little Italy", with Morris Park, Pelham Bay, Throggs Neck, and other Bronx neighborhoods also serving as centers of Italian-American culture.

Bensonhurst used to be heavily Italian-American, and it used to be considered the main "Little Italy" of Brooklyn. Since the late 1990s, most Italians have moved to Staten Island. The Italian-speaking community remains over 20,000 strong, according to the census of 2000. However, the Italian-speaking community is becoming "increasingly elderly and isolated, with the small, tight-knit enclaves they built around the city slowly disappearing as they give way to demographic changes". Its main thoroughfare, 18th Avenue (also known as Cristoforo Colombo Boulevard) between roughly 60th Street and Shore Parkway, is lined with predominantly small, Italian family-owned businesses—many of which have remained in the same family for several generations. 86th Street is another popular local thoroughfare, lined by the arches of the elevated BMT West End Subway Line. The 18th Avenue Station was popularized in opening credits of Welcome Back, Kotter. Rosebank in Staten Island was another one of NYC's main areas of Italian immigrants since the 1880s, and their descendants have continued as its predominant ethnic group, exemplified by the location of the Garibaldi Memorial in the community. In recent years, the town has experienced an influx of other ethnic groups, including Eastern Europeans, various Latin nationalities as well as Asians, particularly from the Philippines. Today, the South Shore of Staten Island is the most heavily populated Italian area in the City of New York. Over 95% of the South Shore is Italian. The neighborhoods of the South Shore with large percentages of Italians are Huguenot, Annadale, Eltingville, and Tottenville. Howard Beach in the Queens is also home to a large Italian population.

During the beginning of the Cold War, immigration into the United States from Italy was almost impossible. Americas were frightened that these immigrants could be terrorists, thus preventing Italians from gaining citizenship. As the Cold War continued, organization groups such as the Italian American Organization and the American Committee on Italian Migration (ACIM) started to form. They created vast efforts to provide assistance and aid to Italian immigrants coming into the United States. Throughout the Cold War, these organizations increased rapidly with many American Italian members as well as many new coming Italians. ACIM also took a leading role in directing the efforts of other Italian American and Catholic organizations that helped contribute to Italian immigration. These organizations provided new migrants with housing, clothing, access to job interviews, and education for children. Immediately after the Cold War period, Italian Americans further consolidated and solidified their status as members of the American mainstream.

== Philadelphia ==
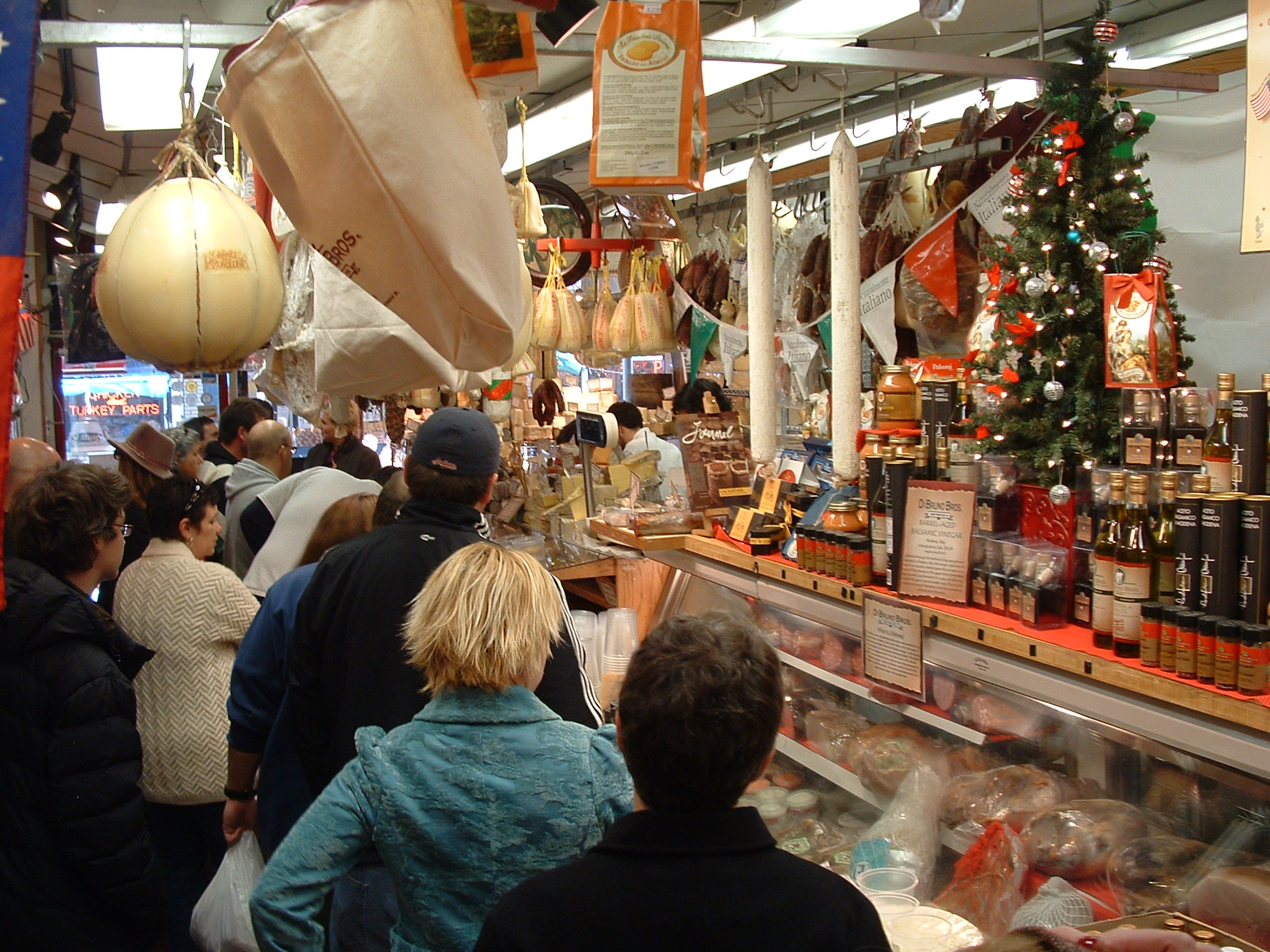
Much of Philadelphia's Italian population is in South Philadelphia, and is well known for its Italian Market.

Philadelphia's Italian American community is the second-largest in the United States. Italian Americans compose 21% of South Philadelphia's 163,000 people, and the area has numerous Italian stores and restaurants. Philadelphia is well known for its Italian Market in South Philadelphia. The Italian Market is the popular name for the South 9th Street Curb Market, an area of Philadelphia featuring many grocery shops, cafes, restaurants, bakeries, cheese shops, and butcher shops, many with an Italian influence.

== Boston ==
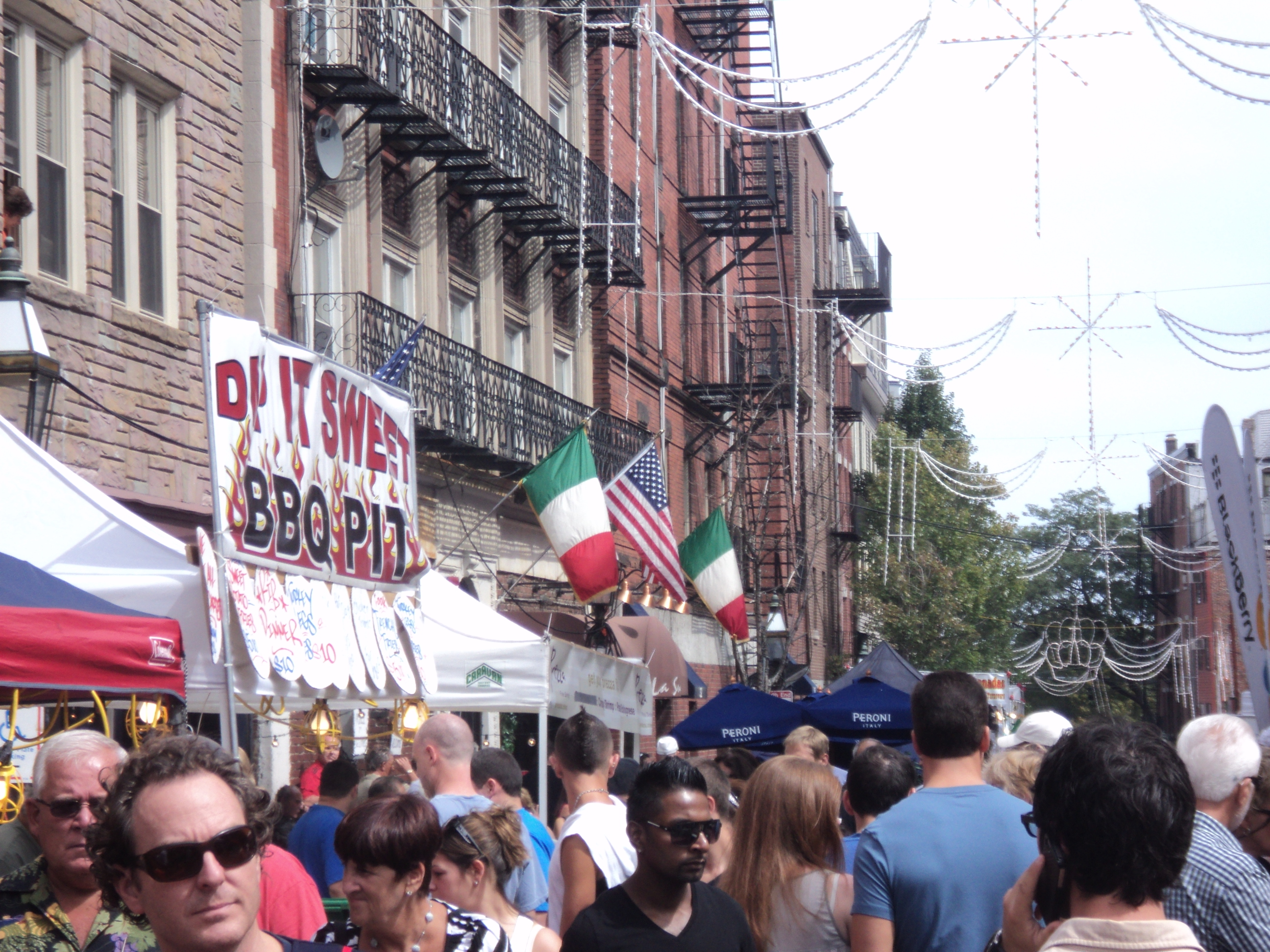
The American and Italian flags in Boston's North End

The North End in Boston since the early 20th century became the center of the Italian community of Boston. It is still largely residential and well known for its small, authentic Italian restaurants and for the first Italian cafe, Caffe Vittoria. The influx of Italian inhabitants has left a lasting mark on the area; many seminal Italian American. The Italians peaked at over 44,000.

== Newark ==
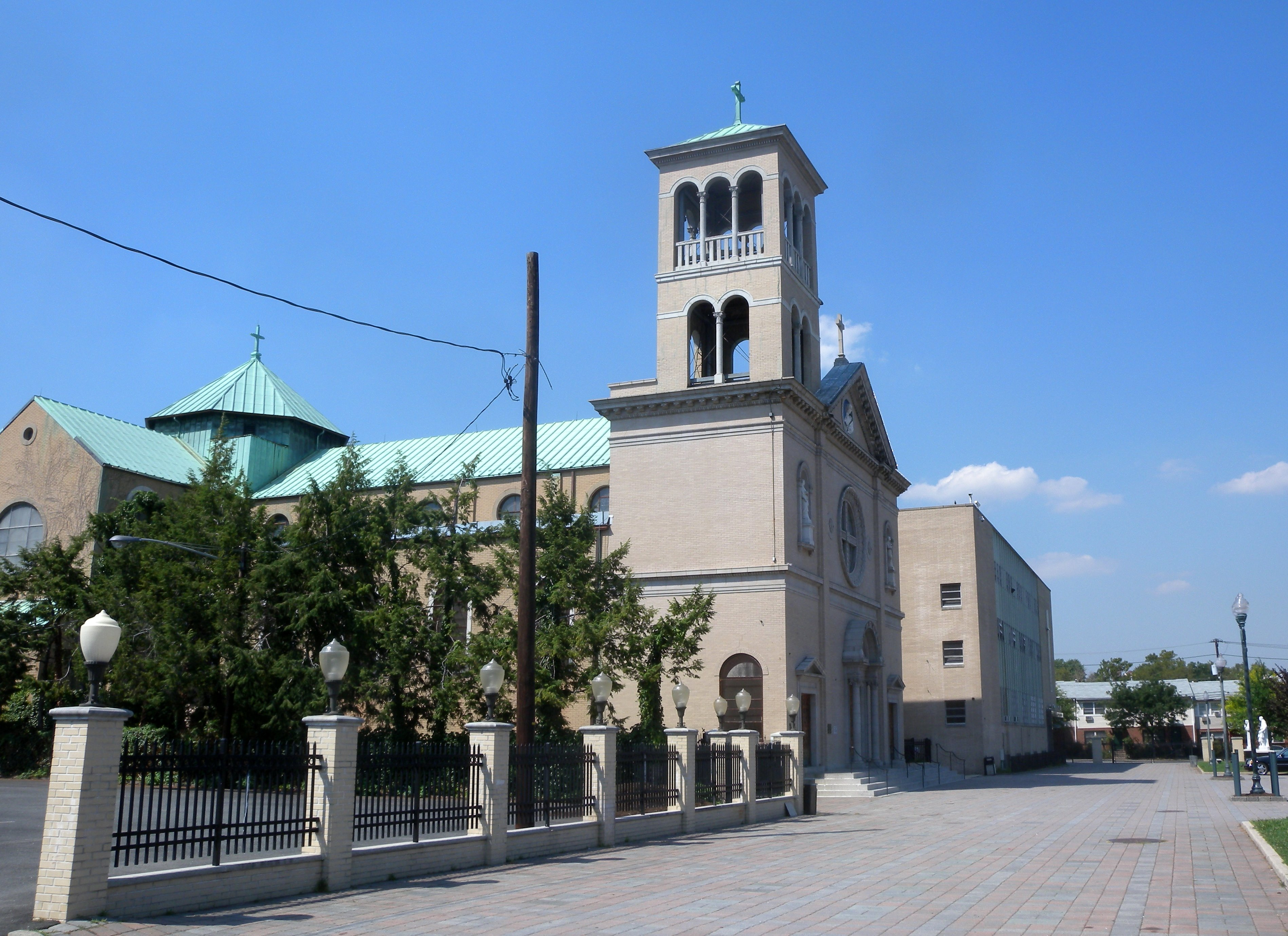
St. Lucy's Church in Newark

In its heyday, Seventh Avenue in Newark was one of the largest Little Italy neighborhoods in the U.S., with a population of 30,000, in an area of less than a square mile. The center of life in the neighborhood was St. Lucy's Church, founded by Italian immigrants in 1891. Throughout the year, St. Lucy's and other churches sponsored processions in honor of saints that became community events. The most famous procession was the Feast of St. Gerard, but there were also great feasts for Our Lady of Mt. Carmel, Our Lady of Snow, the Assumption, and St. Rocco. One of the nation's largest Italian newspapers, The Italian Tribune, was founded on Seventh Avenue. Seventh Avenue was notoriously devastated by urban renewal efforts during the 1950s. Eighth Avenue was obliterated by the city council, scattering the Italian American residents. Most of its businesses never recovered. The construction of Interstate 280 also served to cut the neighborhood off from the rest of the city. After the devastating urban renewal, some of the First Ward's Italians stayed in the neighborhood, while others migrated to other Newark neighborhoods like Broadway, Roseville and the Ironbound.

== Chicago ==
The neighborhood around Chicago's Taylor Street has been called the port of call for Chicago's Italian American immigrants. Taylor Street's Little Italy was home to Hull House, an early settlement house, founded by Jane Addams and Ellen Starr in 1889. Chicago's Italian American experience begins with the mass migration from the shores of southern Italy, the Hull House experiment, the Great Depression, World War II, and the machinations behind the physical demise of a neighborhood by the University of Illinois in 1963.

Italian Americans dominated the inner core of the Hull House neighborhood, 1890s–1930s.

As suburbs grew in the post-World War II era, Chicago's Italian American population spread from the central city, such as to Elmwood Park. Harlem Avenue, "La Corsa Italia", is lined with Italian stores, bakeries, clubs and organizations. The Feast of our Lady of Mount Carmel, in nearby Melrose Park, has been a regular event in the area for more than one hundred years. The near-west suburbs of Melrose Park, Schiller Park, Franklin Park, River Grove, Norridge, Chicago Heights, and Harwood Heights are also home to many Italian Americans. West suburban Stone Park is home of Casa Italia, an Italian American cultural center.

Northwest of Chicago, the city of Rockford has a large population of Italian Americans. Other historical Italian American communities in Illinois include Peoria, Ottawa, Herrin, Quad Cities and the Metro East suburbs of Saint Louis, Missouri.

== Milwaukee ==
Italians first came to Milwaukee, Wisconsin, in the late 19th century. Then in the 19th and 20th centuries large numbers of Italian immigrants began to come in mainly from Sicily and southern Italy. Brady Street, the historic Third Ward and the east side of Milwaukee is considered the heart of Italian immigration to the city, where as many as 20 Italian grocery stores once existed on Brady Street alone. Every year the largest Italian American festival in the United States, Festa Italiana, takes place in Milwaukee. Italian Americans number at around 16,992 in the city, but in Milwaukee County they number at 38,286.

== St. Louis ==
Italian immigrants from the northern Italian region of Lombardy came to St. Louis in the late 19th century and settled in the region called The Hill. As the city grew, immigrants from Southern Italy settled in a different neighborhood north of Downtown St Louis. As of 2021 there are approximately 2,000 native born Italians living in St. Louis, few of whom live in The Hill neighborhood. Italians today live mostly throughout the St. Louis metropolitan region. The Italian Community of St. Louis (Comunita' Italiana di St. Louis), an organization that promotes the Italian language and culture, has several popular events which include Carnevale which occurs every February and Ferragosto which occurs each August. The St. Louis Italian Language Program also exists on the Hill at Gateway Science Academy on Fyler Avenue. The 2005 film The Game of Their Lives is based on the true story of the 1950 U.S. soccer team, which, against all odds, beat England 1–0 in the city of Belo Horizonte, Brazil, during the 1950 FIFA World Cup. The story is about the family traditions and passions that shaped the players who made up this team of underdogs, a significant number of whom were from The Hill neighborhood of St. Louis.

== Los Angeles ==
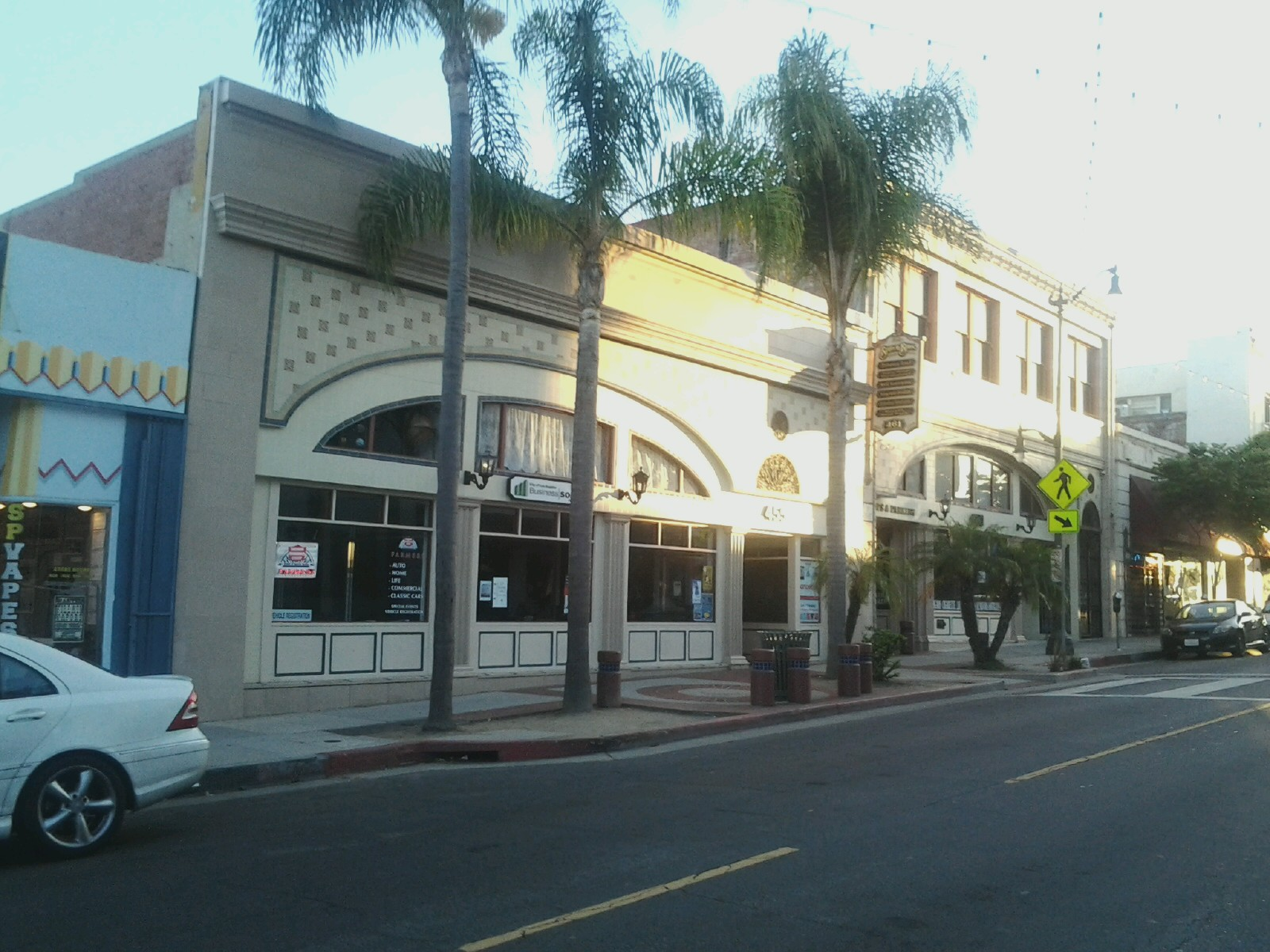
San Pedro is considered to be the Little Italy of Los Angeles.

Los Angeles is home to the largest Italian American community in California (and on the West Coast), with 95,300 people identifying as Italian American. San Pedro is Los Angeles's Little Italy, which is estimated to contain some 45,000 Italian-Americans. Most worked as fisherman during the first half of the 20th century. The traditional center of Los Angeles' Italian American community was the area north of the historic Los Angeles Plaza. It survived somewhat intact until the construction of Los Angeles Union Station, in 1939. The station was built in the center of Los Angeles' Old Chinatown, displacing half of the total Chinese community. The Chinese were allowed to relocate to Little Italy, where they quickly outnumbered the Italian community. Only a few relic-businesses survive, such as San Antonio Winery (the only winery, out of 92, to survive prohibition). The Italian American Museum of Los Angeles opened in 2016 in the historic Italian Hall. Lincoln Heights, northeast of Little Italy, also was a center of the Italian-American population in Los Angeles.

== San Francisco ==
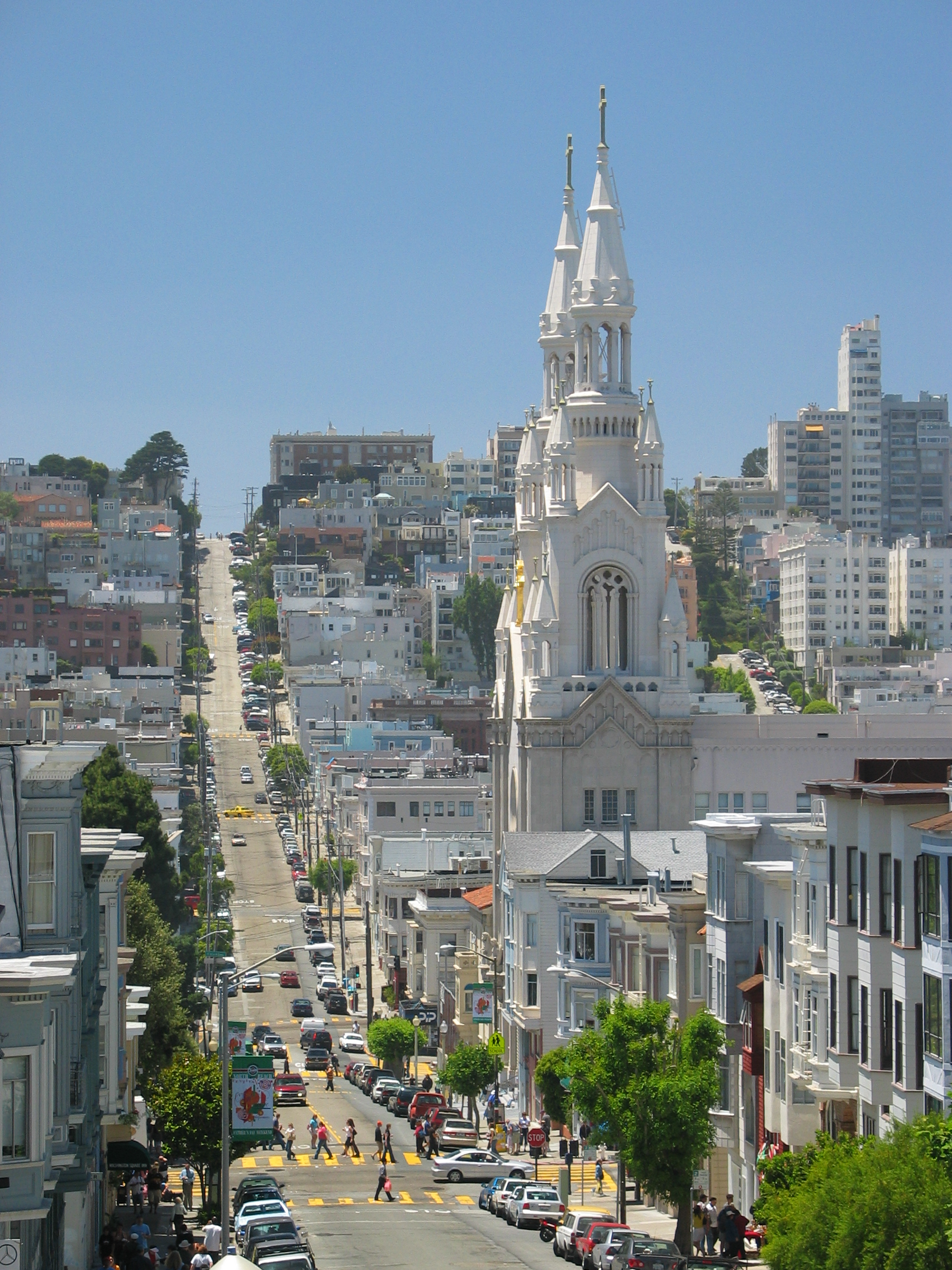
Sts. Peter and Paul Church in North Beach, San Francisco

According to the 1940 census, 18.5% of all European immigrants were Italian, the largest in the city. North Beach is San Francisco's Little Italy, and has historically been home to a large Italian American population. The American Planning Association (APA) has named North Beach as one of ten 'Great Neighborhoods in America'.

== Detroit ==
The first ethnic Italian in Detroit was Alphonse Tonty (Italian name: Alfonso Tonti), a Frenchman with an Italian immigrant father. He was the second-in-command of Antoine de la Mothe Cadillac, who established Detroit in 1701. Tonti's child, born in 1703, was the first ethnic European child born in Detroit. In order to preserve the fur trade, the French administrators and the British administrators discouraged immigration, so the Italian population had slow growth. Growth in immigration increased after Detroit became a part of the United States and the Erie Canal had been constructed. Armando Delicato, author of Italians in Detroit, wrote that Italian immigration to Detroit "lagged behind other cities in the East".

In 1904 the City of Detroit had 900 Italians. In Metro Detroit there were several thousand ethnic Italians by 1900. The concentrations of the population lived in Eastern Market and east of the area presently known as Greektown. Of those Italians in 1900 most originated from Genoa, Lombardy, and Sicily. Some Italians stayed in Detroit temporarily before traveling onwards to mines in northern Michigan.

The increase in the automobile industry resulted in the increase of the Italian population in the 20th century. By 1925, the number of Italians in the City of Detroit increased to 42,000. The historical center of Detroit's Italian-American community was in an area along Gratiot Avenue, east of Downtown Detroit. During that period, Italian immigrants and their children lived throughout the City of Detroit, and several neighborhoods had concentrations of Italian immigrants. There were larger numbers of southern Italians than those from the north. Armando Delicato, author of Italians in Detroit, wrote that "Unlike many other American cities, no region of Italy was totally dominant in this area". Steve Babson, author of Working Detroit: The Making of a Union Town, wrote that "Many northern Italians, coming from an urban and industrialized society, had little in common with local Sicilians, who came from the rural and clannish south." In Detroit's history, within the crafts Italians concentrated on tileworking.

During World War II, Fort Wayne (Detroit) served as home to Italian prisoners of war (POWs) captured during the North African campaign. After Italy's surrender in September 1943, the POWs were given the opportunity to work as servants, cooks, and janitors. At the end of the war many chose to remain and settle in Detroit.

As of 1951, Detroit had about 150,000 Italians.

The National Italian American Foundation estimated that in 1990, Metro Detroit had 280,000 ethnic Italians. As of 2005 the closest remaining large Little Italy near Detroit was Via Italia in Windsor, Ontario and there was a group of remaining Italian shops and restaurants along Garfield Road in Clinton Township. In 2005 Delicato wrote that "Unlike some other national groups, like the Poles, who still look to Hamtramck, or the Mexicans, who have Mexicantown, Italian Detroiters no longer have a geographical center".

== Cleveland ==
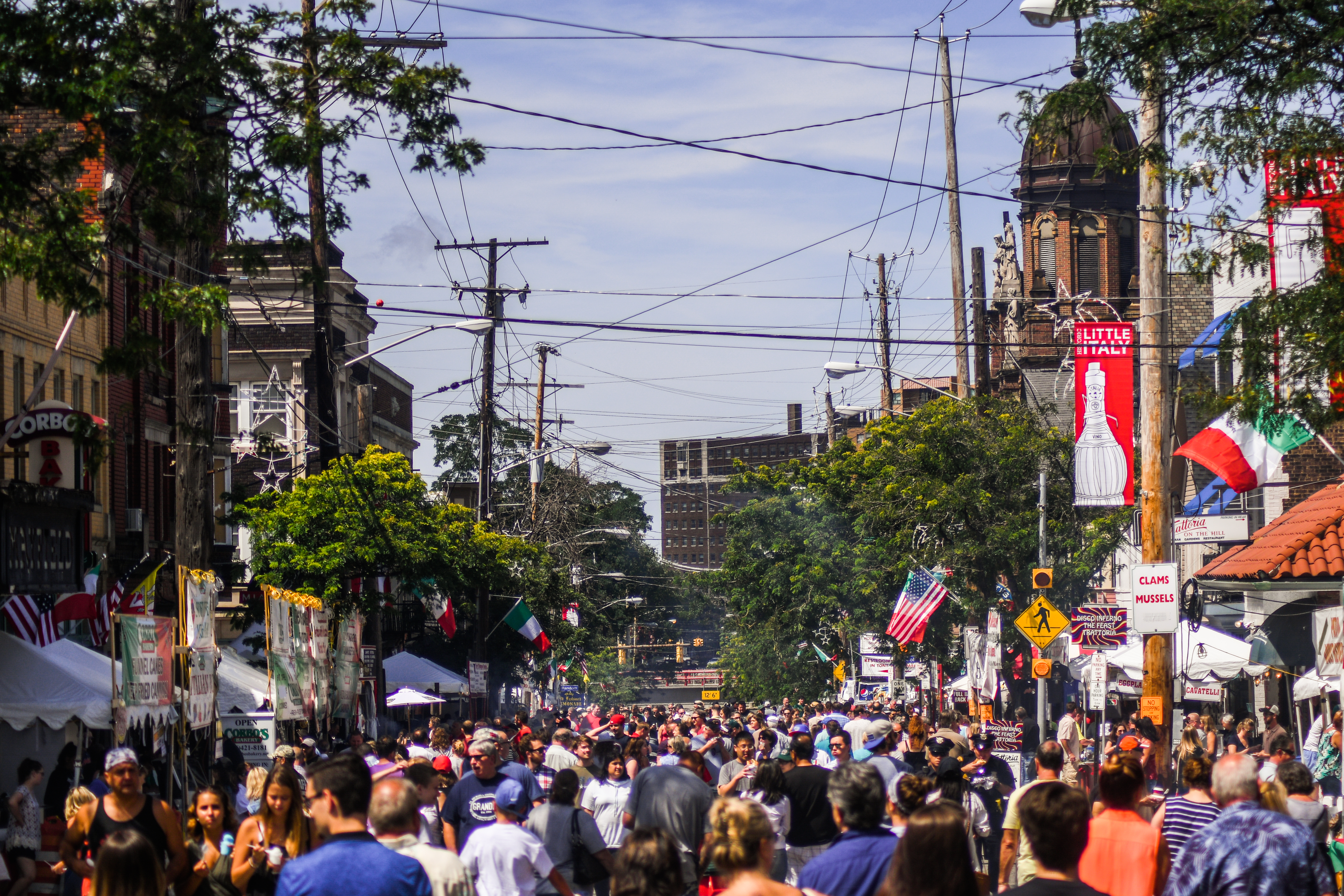
Feast of the Assumption in Cleveland's Little Italy

Cleveland's Little Italy, also known as Murray Hill, is the epicenter of Italian culture in Northeast Ohio, a combined statistical area reporting 285,000 (9.9%) Italian Americans. Little Italy took root when Joseph Carabelli, immigrating in 1880, saw the opportunity for monument work in Cleveland's Lake View Cemetery and established what soon became the city's leading marble and granite works. Most fresco and mosaic work in Cleveland was accomplished by Italian artist immigrants.

Ohio's largest outdoor Italian American street festival, the Feast of the Assumption (Festa dell'assunzione), takes place the weekend of August 15 every year and draws over 100,000 people to the Little Italy neighborhood.

== Kansas City ==
Attracted by employment in its growing railroad and meat packing industries, Italians primarily from Calabria and Sicily immigrated to Kansas City in the late 19th and early 20th centuries. Kansas City's Calabrese mainly passed through the port of New York, sometimes stopping in industrial cities like Pittsburgh along the way, en route to their final destination in the Midwest. Meanwhile, Kansas City's Sicilian community generally came through the port of New Orleans, staying there for a decade or more before bringing their families north. In Kansas City, these communities settled close to one another, often overlapping: the Sicilians taking root in what is now known as the River Market and Columbus Park neighborhoods, and the Calabrese mainly settling in the adjacent "Old Northeast" area.

== New Orleans ==
Economics in Louisiana and Sicily combined to bring about what became known as the Great Migration of thousands of Sicilians. The end of the Civil War allowed the freed men the choice to stay or to go, many chose to leave for higher paying jobs, which in turn led to a perceived scarcity of labor resources for the planters. On March 17, 1866, the Louisiana Bureau of Immigration was formed and planters began to look to Sicily as a possible solution to their labor needs. Steamship companies advertisements were very effective in recruiting potential workers.

In 1890 the ethnic Irish chief of police, David Hennessy was assassinated. Suspicion fell on Italians, whose growing numbers in the city made other whites nervous. The March 14, 1891 New Orleans lynchings were the largest ever mass lynchings in Louisiana history. The use of the term "mafia" by local media in relation to the murder is the first-known usage of the word in print.

== Syracuse ==
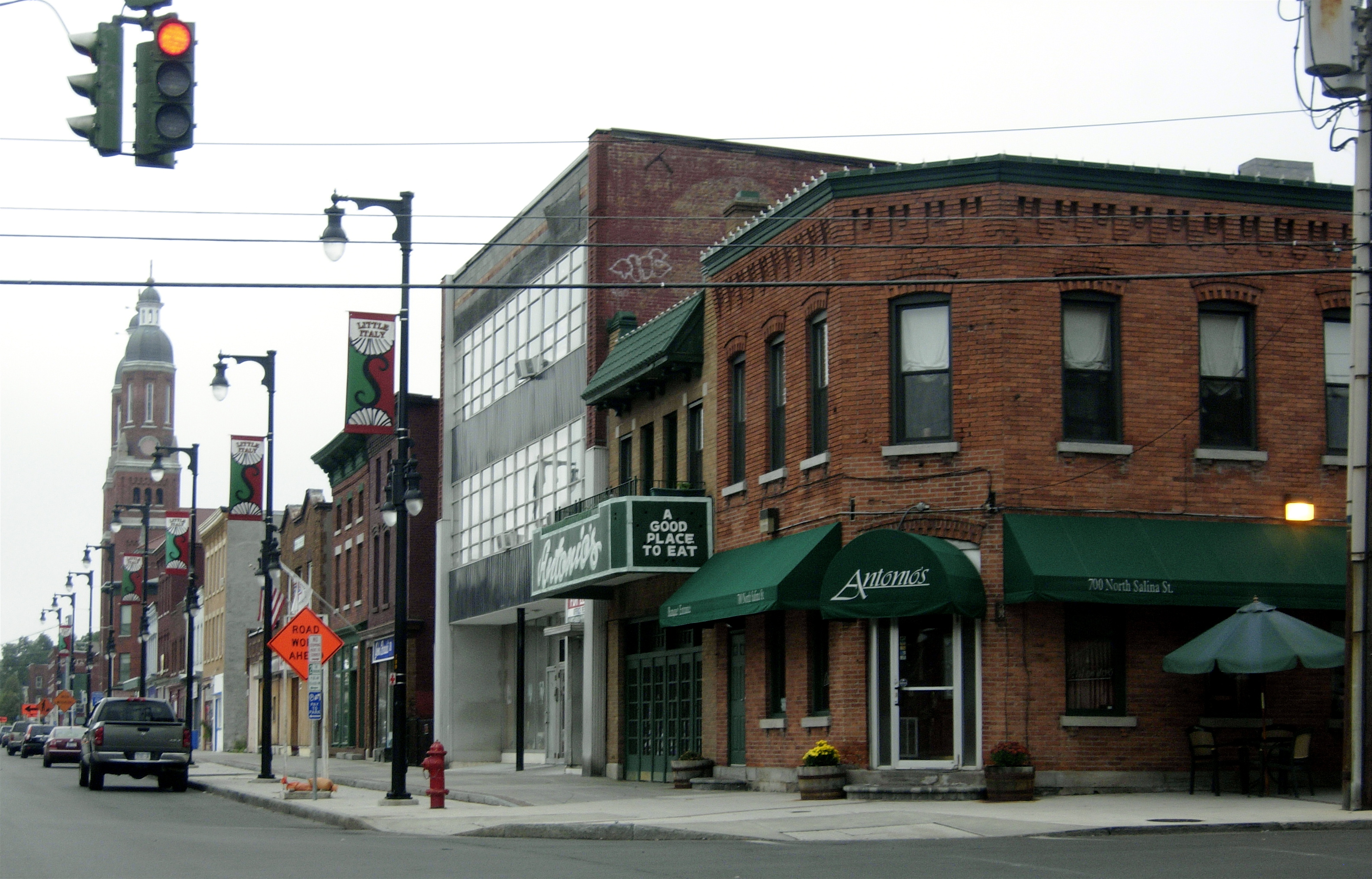
Northside in Syracuse

Italian immigrants first came to the area around Syracuse, New York (a city named for Siracusa, Sicily) in 1883 after providing labor for the construction of the West Shore Railroad. At first, they were quite transient and came and went, but eventually settled down on the Northside. By 1899, the Italian immigrants were living on the Northside of the city in the area centered around Pearl Street. The Italians all but supplanted the Germans in that area of the city and had their own business district along North State and North Salina Streets. By September 2009, Syracuse's Little Italy district received millions of dollars of public and private investment for new sidewalks, streetscapes, landscaping, lighting and to set up a "Green Train" program, which trains men to work in green construction and renovation industries. In recent years, the neighborhood is a mix of Italian shops, restaurants and businesses that cater to the area's South Asian and African population. Although the neighborhood is far less Italian than in past years, banners throughout the district still read Little Italy. By 2010, demographics showed that 14.1% of the population in Syracuse was Italian descent.

== Providence ==
Federal Hill in Providence, Rhode Island, is best known for its Italian American community and abundance of restaurants. The first two decades of the 20th century witnessed heavy Italian American immigration into Federal Hill. Though the area today is more diverse, Federal Hill still retains its status as the traditional center for the city's Italian American community. Providence's annual Columbus Day parade marches down Atwells Avenue.

== Tampa-Ybor City ==
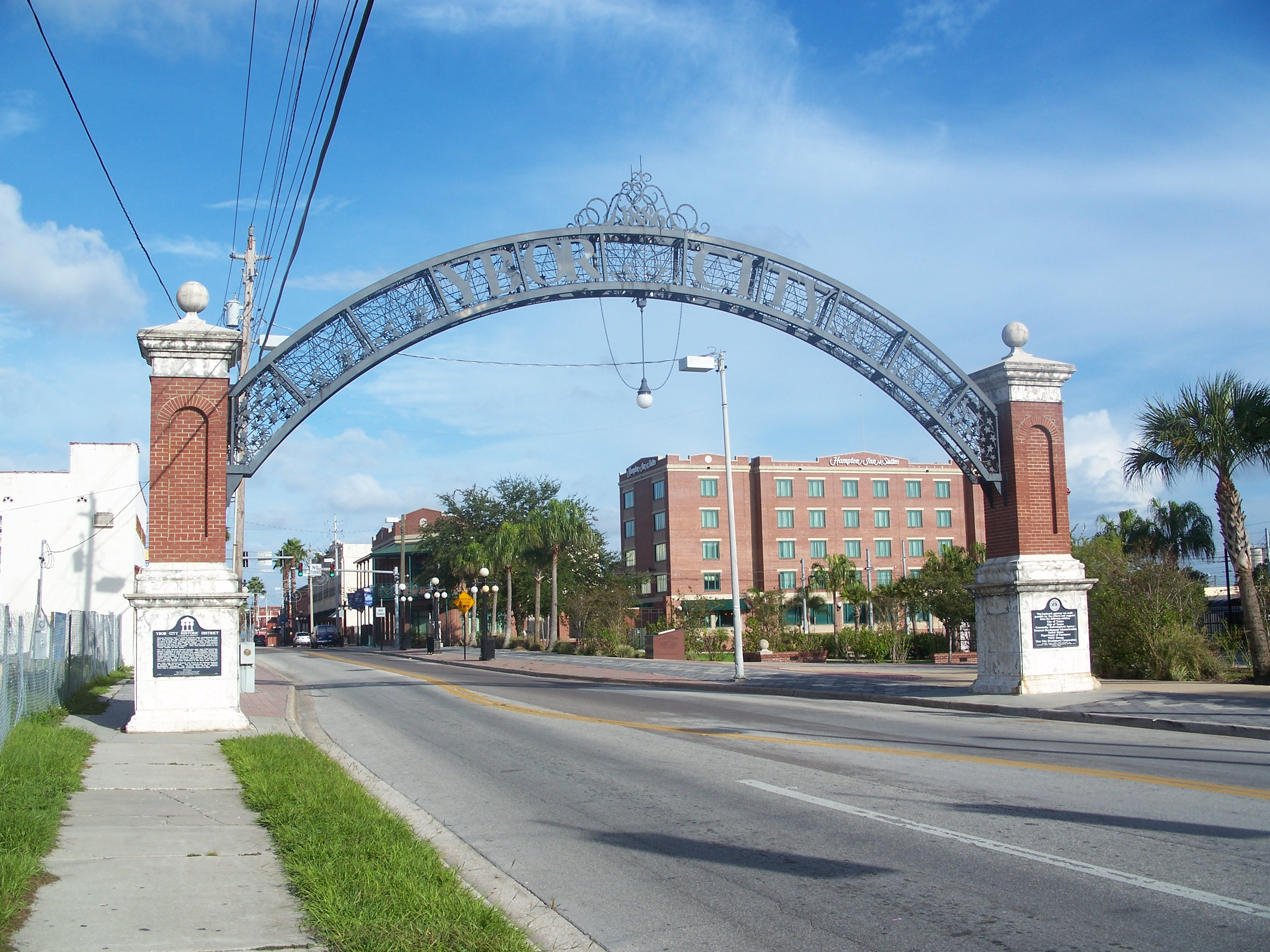
Gateway to Ybor City on 7th. Ave near the Nick Nuccio Parkway

The community of Ybor City in Tampa, Florida is a cigar-centric company town founded in 1885 and originally populated by a unique mix of Spanish, Cuban, Jewish, and Italian immigrants, with most of the Italians coming from a small group of villages in southwestern Sicily. At first, Italians found it difficult to find employment in the insular and guild-like cigar industry, which had moved to Tampa from Cuba and Key West and was dominated by Hispanic workers. Many founded businesses to serve cigar workers, most notably small grocery stores in the neighborhood's commercial district supplied by Italian-owned vegetable and dairy farms located on open land east of Tampa's city limits. The immigrant cultures in town became better integrated as time went by; eventually, approximately 20% of the workers in the cigar industry were Italian Americans. The tradition of local Italian-owned groceries continued, however, and a handful of such businesses founded in the late 1800s were still operating into the 21st century.

== Birmingham ==
Birmingham, Alabama, was representative of smaller industrial centers. Most Italians in the early 20th century came to work in the burgeoning iron and coal industries. Dorothy L. Crim founded the Ensley Community House in the Italian district in 1912 at the behest of the Birmingham City Mission Board. From 1912 to 1969, Ensley House eased the often difficult transition to American life by providing direct assistance.

== San Diego ==
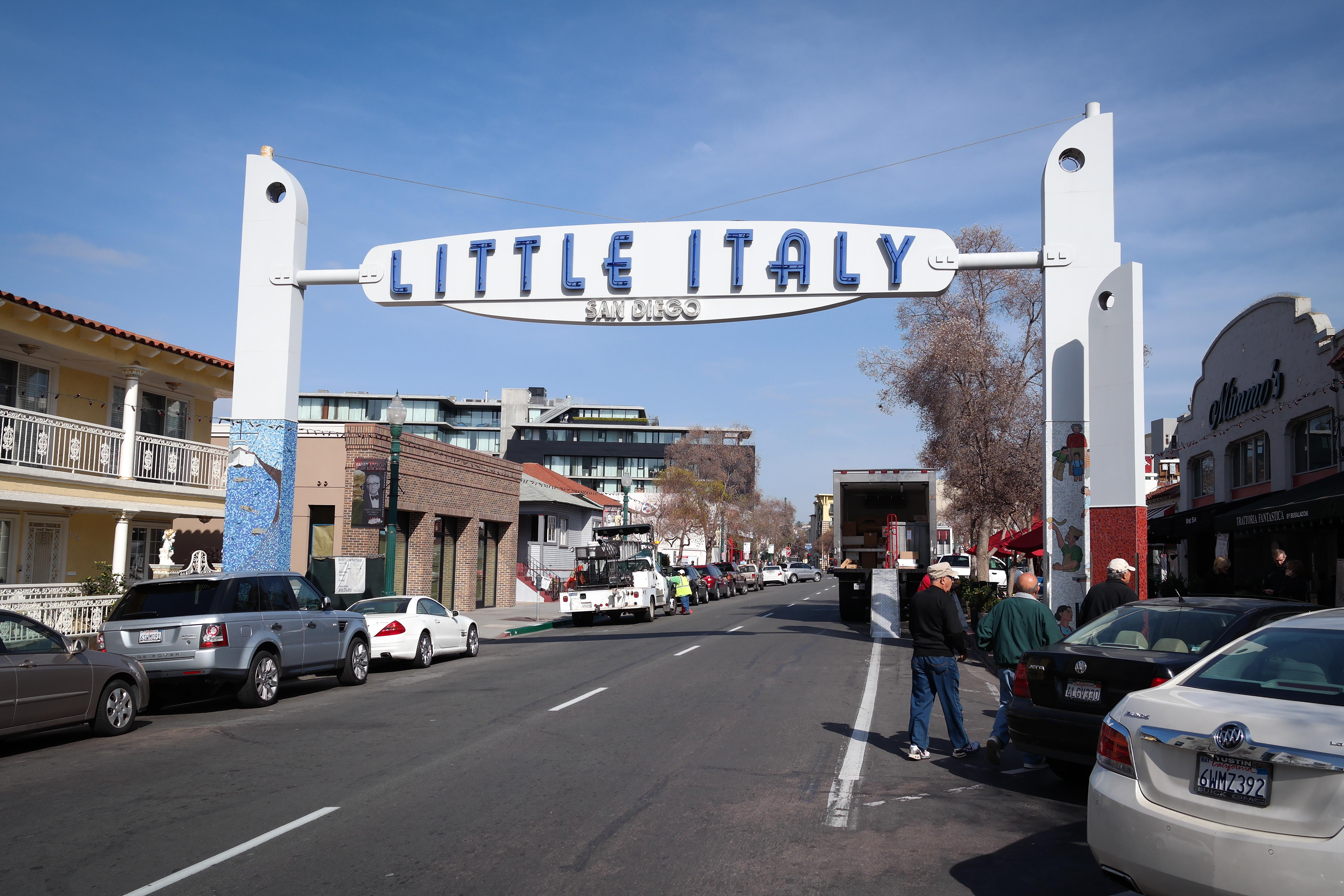
San Diego's Little Italy

Historically, Little Italy in San Diego was the home to Italian fishermen and their families. Many Italians moved to San Diego from San Francisco after the 1906 San Francisco earthquake in search of tuna and other deep-sea sport and commercial fish. When Interstate 5 was constructed through Little Italy in the early 1970s, 35% of the neighborhood was destroyed and during the same time the California tuna industry was declining, which caused the neighborhood to suffer nearly 30 years of decline. With the creation of the Little Italy Association in 1996, the neighborhood has gone through gentrification and has seen a renaissance as Community Benefit District specializing in Italian food, boutique shopping and maintenance that makes this shopping district the place to live in Downtown San Diego.

== West Virginia ==
Tens of thousands of Italians came to West Virginia during the late 1800s and early 1900s to work in the coal camps. As pick-and-shovel miners, Italians hold most of the state's coal production records. One Carmine Pellegrino mined 66 tons of coal by hand in a 24-hour period. The communities of Clarksburg, Wheeling, and Bluefield each hold their own annual Italian Heritage Festival. Fairmont puts on a street festival every December that pays homage to the Feast of the Seven Fishes, an Italian tradition of eating seafood dishes on Christmas Eve instead of meat.

== Arkansas ==
There was a historical trend of immigration of Italians into the U.S. state of Arkansas in the 19th and 20th centuries.

Austin Corbin, the owner of the Sunnyside Plantation in Chicot County, within the Arkansas Delta region, decided to employ Italians there during the post-Reconstruction period.

Italians later moved from the Arkansas Delta to the Ozarks, establishing Tontitown.

== Baltimore ==
Italians began to settle in Baltimore during the late 1800s. Some Italian immigrants came to the Port of Baltimore by boat. The earliest Italian settlers in Baltimore were sailors from Genoa, the capital city of the Italian region of Liguria, who arrived during the 1840s and 1850s. Later immigrants came from Naples, Abruzzo, Cefalù, and Palermo. These immigrants created the monument to Christopher Columbus in Druid Hill Park. Many other Italians came by train after entering the country through New York City's Ellis Island. Italian immigrants who arrived by train would enter the city through the President Street Station. Because of this, Italians largely settled in a nearby neighborhood that is now known as Little Italy.

Little Italy comprises six blocks bounded by Pratt Street to the North, the Inner Harbor to the South, Eden Street to the East, and President Street to the West. Other neighborhoods where large numbers of Italians settled include Lexington, Belair-Edison, and Cross Street. Many settled along Lombard Street, which was named after the Italian town of Guardia Lombardi. The Italian community, overwhelmingly Roman Catholic, established a number of Italian American parishes such as St. Leo's Church and Our Lady of Pompeii Church. The Our Lady of Pompeii Church holds the annual Highlandtown Wine Festival, which celebrates Italian-American culture and benefits the Highlandtown community association.

== Mississippi ==
Italians have settled in the state of Mississippi since colonial times, although numbers have increased over the years. Since the 18th and mainly the 19th century, Italian settlers have been located in cities and towns across Mississippi. In 1554, Mississippi began to have a real Italian presence, because of the Hernando de Soto expedition. The first Italians who visited Mississippi came in explorations conducted by the French and Spanish governments.

In the 19th century, many Italians entered the United States in New Orleans and traveled onwards to Mississippi. Over 100 immigrants lived in Mississippi as the American Civil War started. In the late 19th century, Italian immigration increased in the United States, which made a tremendous impact on the area.

== Denver ==
Large numbers of Italians first came to Colorado in the late nineteenth and early twentieth centuries. Some settled in industrial Pueblo or in Welby, which was then a farming community, but the largest Italian community in twentieth century Colorado was in Northwest Denver, or as it was known at the time, "the North Side" or "North Denver."

Italians first put down roots there because St. Patrick's Catholic Church, a largely Irish-descended congregation, already existed in the neighborhood. In 1894, the Italian community on the North Side formed its own Catholic church called Our Lady of Mt. Carmel. The community remained strong through the early twentieth century, but in the decades after World War II, many Italian-Americans left Denver proper. Today, descendants of the old North Side Italian-American community are spread across metro Denver, particularly in its inner northwestern suburbs like Wheat Ridge, Westminster and Arvada.

Reminders of the old Italian community in Northwest Denver are few and far between today. Many of the remaining landmarks are on 38th Avenue. One is Gaetano's, a storied Italian American eatery on 38th Avenue and Tejon Street once owned by the Smaldone family, which was involved in bootlegging in Denver. Many members of the Italian-American community in Northwest Denver could trace their roots to Potenza, a comune in Basilicata. A fraternal organization called the Potenza Lodge was founded in 1899 and still exists today on the corner of Shoshone Street and 38th Avenue.

== Las Vegas ==
There is a significant Italian American community in Las Vegas.

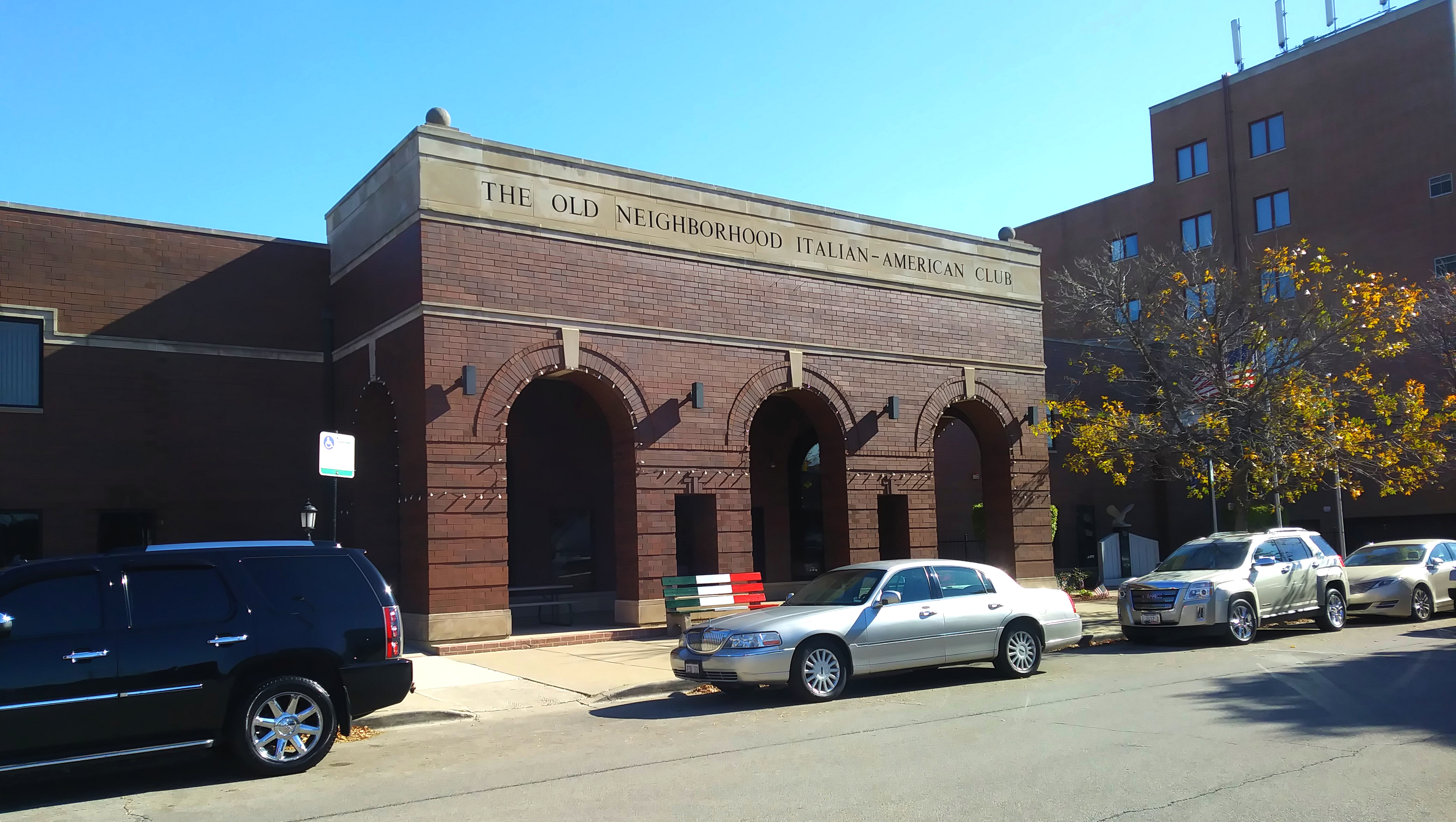
Old Neighborhood Italian American Club, Las Vegas

== See also ==
- Italian Americans
