= Lombard Street (Baltimore) =

Street in Baltimore, Maryland, U.S.

Coordinates: 39°17′16″N 76°36′48″W

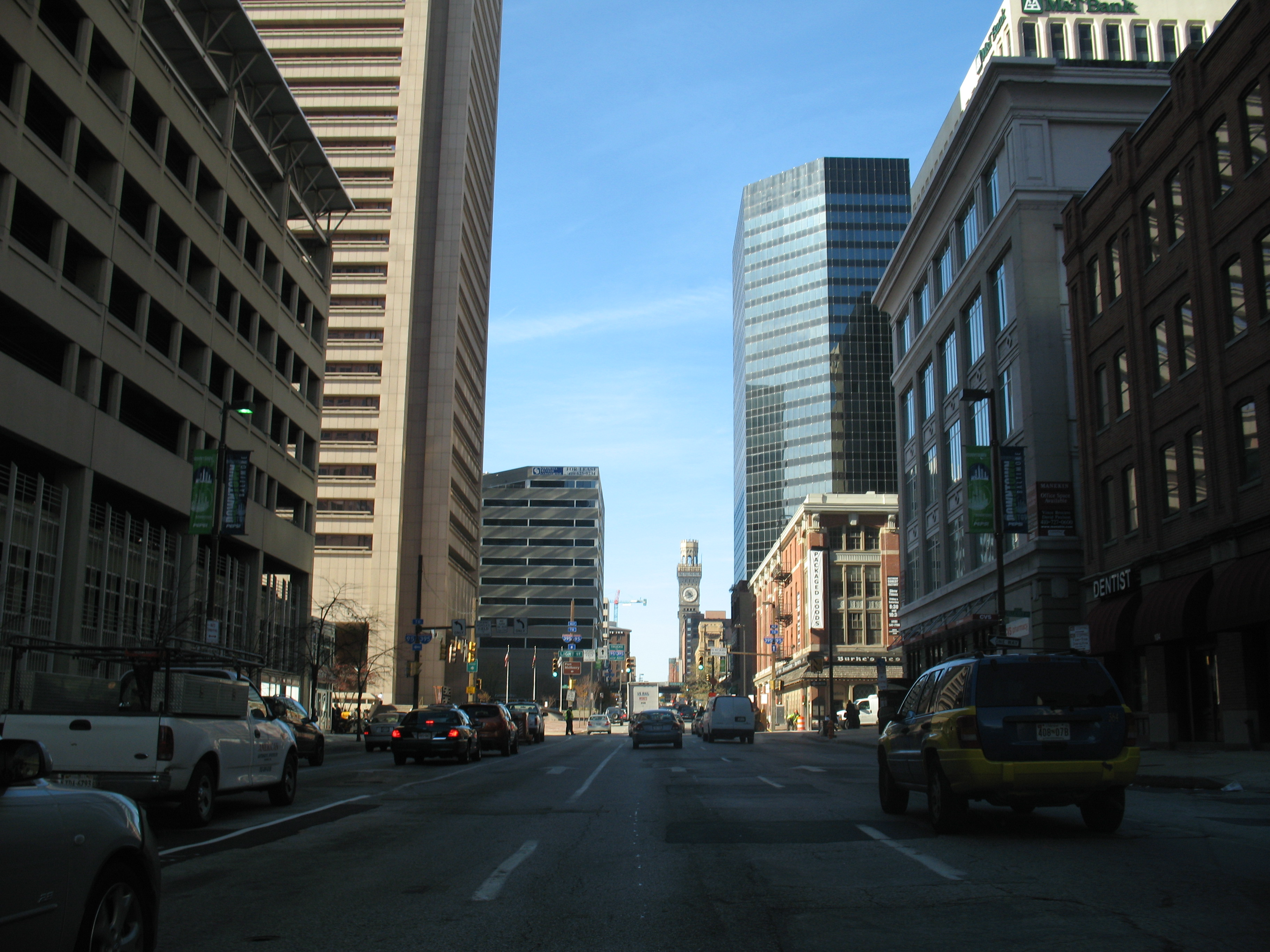
- Lombard Street near Light Street
- Interactive map of Lombard Street
- Owner: City of Baltimore
- Location: Baltimore
- Postal code: 21201, 21202, 21223, 21224, 21231
- West end: Frederick Avenue
- East end: Patterson Park Avenue

Lombard Street is a major street in Baltimore. It forms a one-way pair of streets with Pratt Street that run west–east through downtown Baltimore. For most of their route, Pratt Street is one-way in an eastbound direction, and Lombard Street is one-way westbound. Both streets begin in west Baltimore at Frederick Avenue and end in Butcher's Hill at Patterson Park Avenue. Since 2005, these streets have been open to two-way traffic from Broadway until their end at Patterson Park; in addition, Lombard is also two-way from Fulton Avenue to Martin Luther King Jr. Boulevard, near the University of Maryland at Baltimore campus.

To the east of Patterson Park, both Pratt and Lombard Streets start again at Linwood Avenue. Lombard Street continues mostly as a multilane street until Kane Street, short of reaching Interstate 95. Lombard, which is known as Lombard Street East in this area, with part of an interchange with the Harbor Tunnel Thruway and access to Bayview Medical Center.

Lombard Street is one of Downtown Baltimore's older streets. Its name comes from the Italian town Guardia Lombardi, as Lombard Street was originally an Italian settlement. It has undergone many changes over the past hundred years but became famous for its Corned Beef row.

== Corned Beef Row ==
"Corned Beef Row" is a stretch of East Lombard Street that was once the center of Jewish life in Baltimore. Today, only a few landmarks remain. Notable is Attman's Delicatessen, founded in 1915, which is famous throughout the city for its hot corned beef sandwiches. Attman's Delicatessen was founded by Harry Attman. Harry had three sons: Edward Attman (founder of Acme Paper & Supply), Seymour Attman, and Leanord Attman (founder of Attman Properties). Since Harry, the deli has been operated by his son Seymour and now Harry's grandson Marc Attman. Attman's Delicatessen is the oldest Jewish deli in the country still operated by the original family.

== Jewish Museum and B'nai Israel ==
The Jewish Museum of Maryland is located on Lloyd Street near Lombard. The museum campus includes the historic Lloyd Street and B'nai Israel Synagogue and a modern museum building with changing exhibition galleries and research library. B'nai Israel Synagogue is an active, 200 family congregation housed in a 133-year-old building. The synagogue currently holds services every Shabbat and Jewish HolyDay, and classes covering various topics three weeknights. Rabbi Etan Mintz is the current spiritual leader.

== Other notable landmarks ==
- Little Italy neighborhood
- Baltimore City Community College Harbor Campus
- Port Discovery (nearby)
- Bromo Seltzer Tower

== See also ==
- Lombard Street Bridge
