= History of Italians in Baltimore =

The history of Italians in Baltimore dates back to the mid-19th century. The city's Italian-American community is centered in the neighborhood of Little Italy.

== Demographics ==
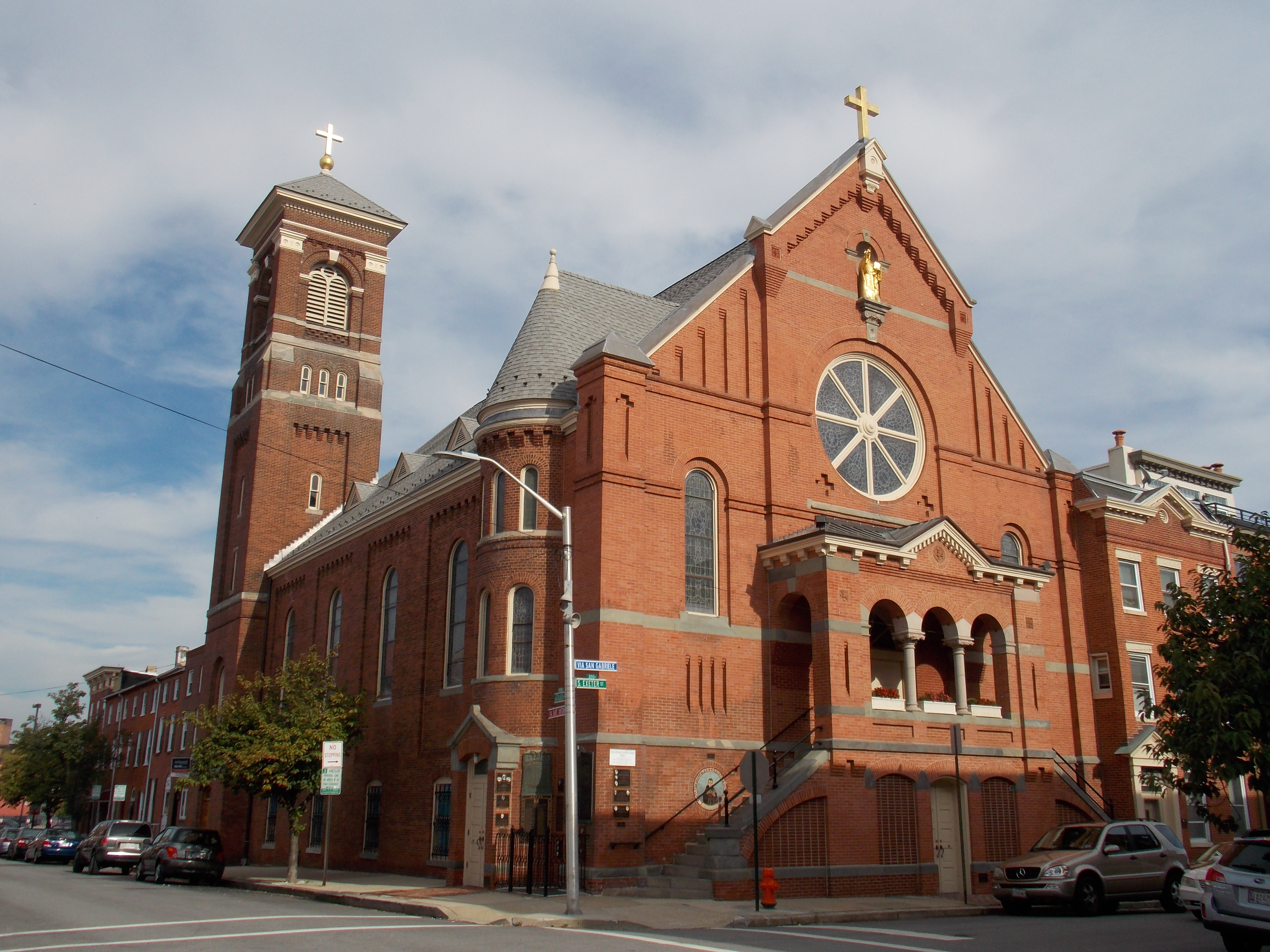
St. Leo's Catholic Church, Little Italy, September 2014.

In 1920, 7,930 foreign-born white people in Baltimore spoke the Italian language.

In 1940, 8,063 immigrants from Italy lived in Baltimore. These immigrants comprised 13.2% of the city's foreign-born white population. In total, 18,179 people of Italian birth or descent lived in the city, comprising 13% of the foreign-stock white population.

In the 1960 United States census, Italian-Americans comprised 71% of the foreign-stock white population in Little Italy, Baltimore's tract 3–2.

The Italian community in the Baltimore metropolitan area numbered 157,498 as of 2000, making up 6.2% of the area's population. In the same year Baltimore city's Italian population was 18,492, 2.8% of the city's population.

In 2013, an estimated 16,581 Italian-Americans resided in Baltimore city, 2.7% of the population.

In September 2014, immigrants from Italy were the thirty-sixth largest foreign-born population in Baltimore.

== History ==
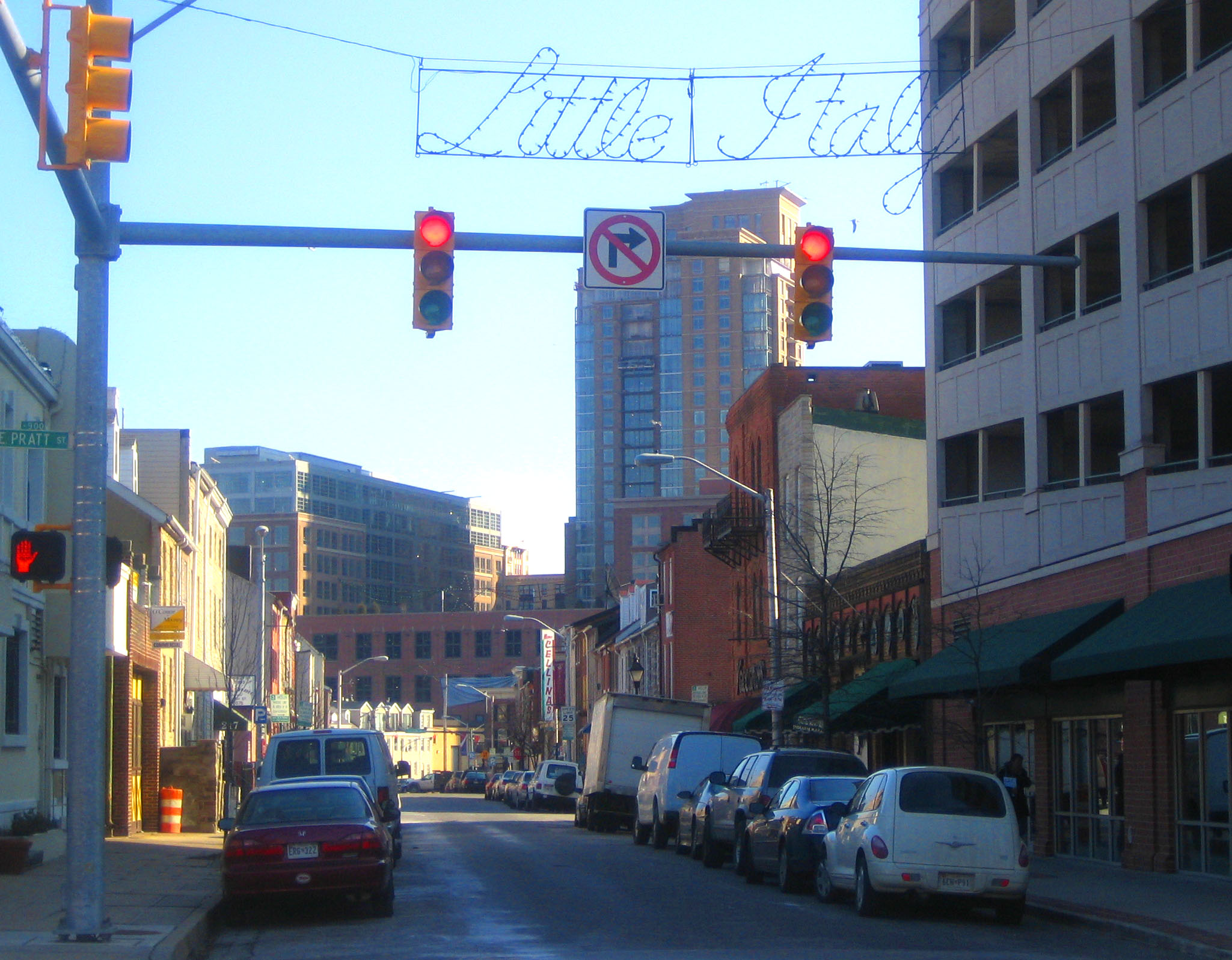
Little Italy, at the corner of Pratt and Albemarle Streets, February 2007.

"No Italian need apply" advertisement in the Baltimore Sun, April 20, 1910.

Italians began to settle in Baltimore during the late 1800s. Some Italians immigrants came to the Port of Baltimore by boat. The earliest Italian settlers in Baltimore were sailors from Genoa, the capital city of the Italian region of Liguria, who arrived during the 1840s and 1850s. Later immigrants came from Naples, Abruzzo, Cefalù, and Palermo. These immigrants created the monument to Christopher Columbus in Druid Hill Park. Many other Italians came by train after entering the country through New York City's Ellis Island. Italian immigrants who arrived by train would enter the city through the President Street Station. Because of this, Italians largely settled in a nearby neighborhood that is now known as Little Italy.

Little Italy comprises 6 blocks bounded by Pratt Street to the North, the Inner Harbor to the South, Eden Street to the East, and President Street to the West. Other neighborhoods where large numbers of Italians settled include Lexington, Belair-Edison, and Cross Street. Many settled along Lombard Street, which was named after the Italian town of Guardia Lombardi. The Italian community, overwhelmingly Roman Catholic, established a number of Italian-American parishes such as St. Leo's Church and Our Lady of Pompeii Church. The Our Lady of Pompeii Church holds the annual Highlandtown Wine Festival, which celebrates Italian-American culture and benefits the Highlandtown community association.

The August 2016 Central Italy earthquake affected Baltimore's Italian community, as many Baltimore Italian-Americans have friends or relatives living in Italy. Most Italians in Baltimore are of Southern or Central Italian descent, especially from Abruzzo, a region of Southern Italy close to the epicenter of the earthquake. St. Leo the Great Catholic Church in Little Italy held a vigil and sent prayers to the victims and survivors of the earthquake.

During the 2020s, some Italian-Americans in Baltimore have opposed replacing Columbus Day with Indigenous' Peoples Day. John Pica, a former state senator of Italian descent, stated that commemorating Columbus Day was important because it "recognized Italians could be considered white people. We weren't even considered white people". Pica's remarks were condemned by Ryan Dorsey, a Baltimore City Council member of Italian descent. The organization Baltimore Italians for Indigenous Peoples Day has testified in favor of replacing Columbus Day with Indigenous Peoples' Day.

== Notable Italian-Americans from Baltimore ==
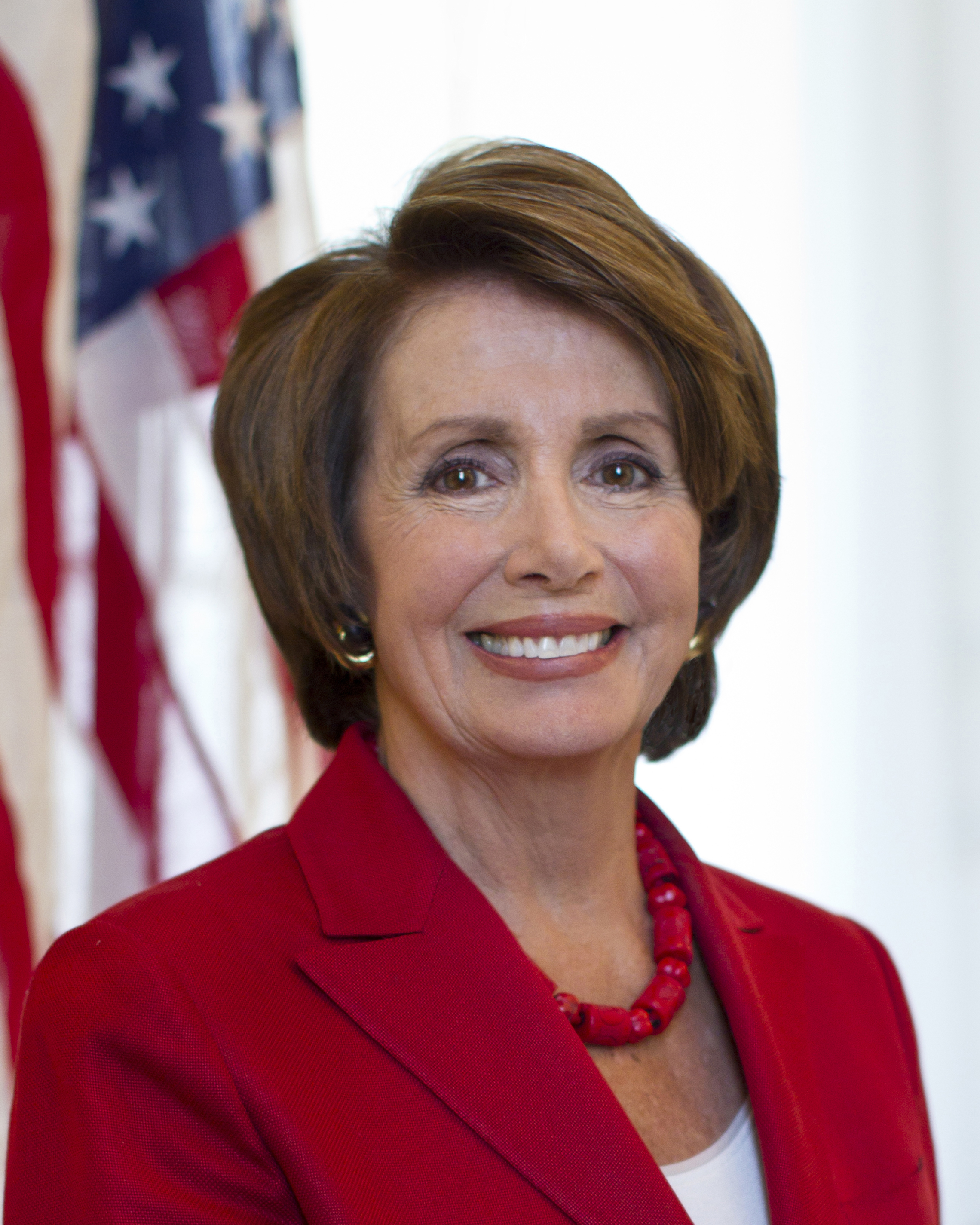
Nancy Pelosi, the 60th Speaker of the United States House of Representatives, serving from 2007 to 2011, and from 2019 to the present. She is the only woman to have served as the House Speaker and to date is the second highest-ranking female politician in American history.

- Rafael Alvarez, an author based in Baltimore and Los Angeles.
- Frank Battaglia, a former Baltimore Police Department officer who was Commissioner of the department.
- Steve Bisciotti, the majority owner of the Baltimore Ravens.
- Charles Bonaparte, a lawyer and political activist for progressive and liberal causes.
- Gary D'Addario, a retired police commander, television technical advisor and actor.
- Thomas D'Alesandro, Jr., a politician who was a U.S. Representative from Maryland's 3rd congressional district and subsequently the mayor of Baltimore, Maryland. He was the father of former House Speaker Nancy Pelosi and former Baltimore Mayor Thomas L. J. D'Alesandro III.
- Thomas L. J. D'Alesandro III, an attorney and former politician who served as Mayor of Baltimore. He is the brother of former House Speaker Nancy Pelosi and son of former Baltimore Mayor Thomas D'Alesandro, Jr.
- Joe Dundee, a boxer, World Welterweight Champion, and brother of Middleweight Champion Vince Dundee.
- Vince Dundee, the former New York State middleweight champion of the world.
- Cipriano Ferrandini, an immigrant from Corsica and long-time barber/hairdresser at Barnum's Hotel in Baltimore.
- Victor Galeone, the Bishop Emeritus of St. Augustine, Florida.
- Harry Jeffra, a former world bantamweight and NYSAC featherweight boxing champion.
- Kevin Levrone, a former IFBB professional bodybuilder, IFBB Hall of Famer, blogger, musician and actor.
- Joey Maggs, a professional wrestler better known by the ring name "Jumping" Joey Maggs.
- Nicholas Mangione, real estate developer and philanthropist
- Samuel J. Palmisano, the former president and chief executive officer of IBM.
- Vincent Luke Palmisano, a politician who served as a member of the Maryland House of Delegates and as a member of the Baltimore City Council.
- Nancy Pelosi, the 60th Speaker of the United States House of Representatives.
- Santino Quaranta, a former soccer player.
- Frank Zappa, a musician, bandleader, songwriter, composer, recording engineer, record producer, and film director.

=== Fictional Italian-Americans from Baltimore ===
- Tommy Carcetti, a fictional character on the HBO drama The Wire.
- Steve Crosetti, a fictional character on the television drama series Homicide: Life on the Street.
- Paul Falsone, a fictional police detective of the Baltimore Police Department on Homicide: Life on the Street.
- Al Giardello, a fictional character from the television drama Homicide: Life on the Street.
- Mike Giardello, a fictional character from the television drama Homicide: Life on the Street.
- Anthony DiNozzo, a fictional character and protagonist from the CBS TV series NCIS.
- Salvatore Romano, a fictional character on the AMC drama Mad Men.

== See also ==
- Ethnic groups in Baltimore
- History of Baltimore
