= Lombard Street Bridge =

- U.S. National Register of Historic Places
- Location within Baltimore Location within Maryland Location within the United States
- Location: Over Gwynns Falls off Wetheredsville Rd., Baltimore, Maryland
- Coordinates: 39°19′1.5″N 76°42′0.3″W
- Area: 0.1 acres (0.040 ha)
- Built: 1877
- Architect: Bollman, Wendel
- Architectural style: Water-main truss
- NRHP reference No.: 75002093
- Added to NRHP: September 27, 1972

Lombard Street Bridge is a historic truss bridge located at Baltimore, Maryland, United States. It is an 88-foot cast iron span consisting of three lines of trusses—two outer trusses of composite cast and wrought iron in a diagonal Pratt design and a center composite bowstring truss of Pratt-system web. It was designed in 1877 by engineer Wendel Bollman (1814–1884). The center bowstring is actually a bifurcated cast iron water main. This design for a bridge carrying a water line as a component of the truss bridge support itself is a unique design element of this bridge.

The bridge was dismantled and placed into storage in 1975, after it was judged that it could not handle the increased traffic on Lombard Street. It was listed on the National Register of Historic Places in 1972.
