= St. Leo's Church (Baltimore) =

Historic church in Maryland, United States

- U.S. National Register of Historic Places
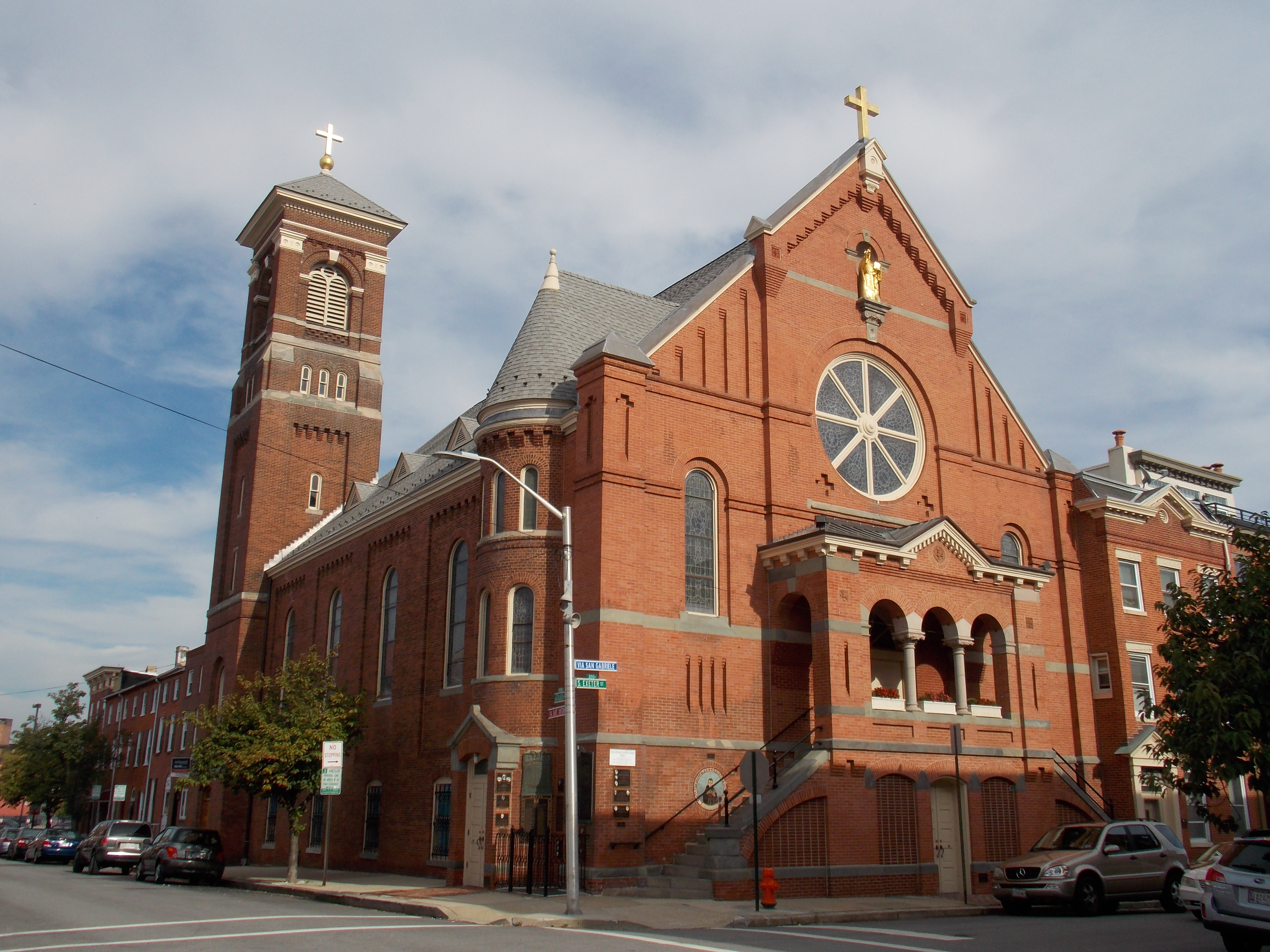
- St. Leo's Church, 2014

- Location within Baltimore Location within Maryland Location within the United States
- Location: 227 S. Exeter St., Little Italy, Baltimore, Maryland
- Coordinates: 39°17′14.1″N 76°36′3.3″W
- Area: less than one acre
- Built: 1880
- Architect: E. Francis Baldwin, Edwin Brady
- Architectural style: Eclectic
- NRHP reference No.: 83002939
- Added to NRHP: July 28, 1983

St. Leo's Church is a historic Roman Catholic church complex located within the Archdiocese of Baltimore in Little Italy, Baltimore, Maryland, United States. It is the 'core' of the neighborhood.

== Description ==
The church was built in 1880-81 of brick with stone trim, and combines Italianate, Romanesque, and Classical elements. It features a high entrance porch, a turret with conical roof on the north wall, a square bell tower at the northeast corner, a large rose window in the main façade, and a variety of decorative brickwork. It was the first church in Maryland, and among the first in the nation, founded and built specifically for Italian immigrants. The church was designed by Baltimore architect E. Francis Baldwin.

St. Leo's Church was listed on the National Register of Historic Places in 1983. It houses an 1881 historic Niemann pipe organ. The organ was played in recital during the Organ Historical Society Convention in July 2024.

== Gallery ==
A photograph of Saint Leo's from a 1914 publication
