= Little Italy, Baltimore =

Little Italy
- Neighborhood of Baltimore
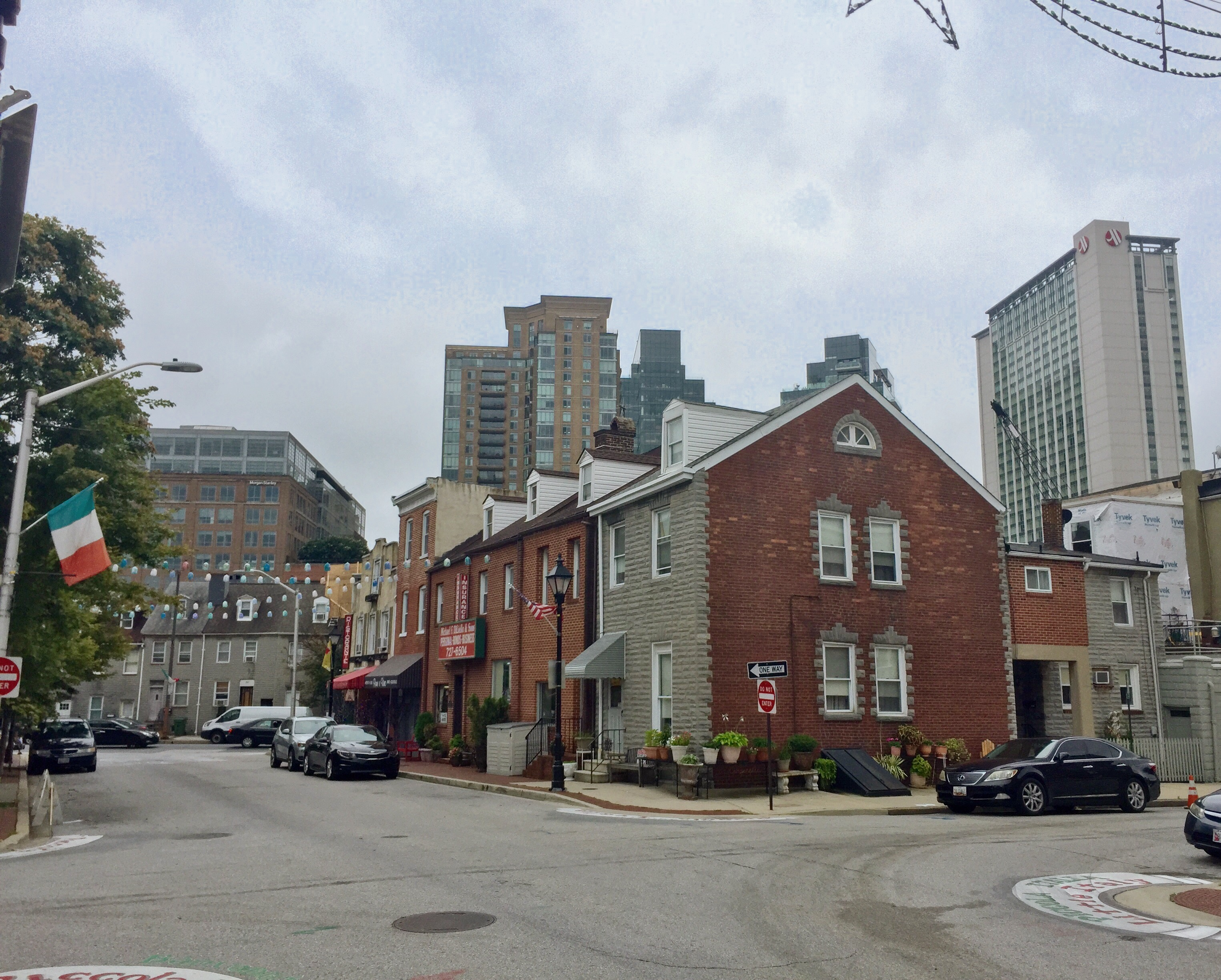
- Little Italy from the corner of High Street and Trinity Street.

- Location within Baltimore
- Coordinates: 39°17′05″N 76°36′08″W
- Country: United States
- State: Maryland
- City: Baltimore
- Named for: Italian-American ethnic heritage

Little Italy is a neighborhood located in southeastern Baltimore, Maryland. The neighborhood is known for its strong Italian-American heritage and identity. The neighborhood is still mostly populated by the descendants of Italian-American immigrants and remains a closely knit ethnic enclave.

Due to its close proximity to desirable neighborhoods such as Fell's Point, Upper Fell's Point and Harbor East, real estate values in Little Italy have become high in recent years. Another cause for the neighborhood's competitive real estate market is the lack of properties entering the market due to the longstanding neighborhood tradition of keeping houses within the family. Each summer, the Little Italy community hosts an outdoor film festival where outdoor movies are projected onto a wall at the intersection of High and Stiles Streets.

== History ==
Located just east of the Inner Harbor, Little Italy was given its name due to the large number of Italian immigrant families that moved into the area during the late 19th and early 20th centuries. When Italian immigrants first moved into the what is now Little Italy, the neighborhood was home to a diverse community of Irish, German, and Jewish immigrants. By the start of the 20th century, the neighborhood had become almost exclusively Italian-American, eventually earning it the name, Little Italy. Little Italy is home to St. Leo the Great Roman Catholic Church, established in 1881 (cornerstone laid 1880), and listed on the National Register of Historic Places. The church has traditionally been the centerpiece of the largely Catholic neighborhood and is still frequented by local residents along with Italian-Americans from elsewhere in Baltimore with family roots to the neighborhood. Saint Anthony is credited by the community for saving the neighborhood from the Great Baltimore Fire of 1904, and the feast of Saint Anthony Italian Festival is still celebrated in honor of him. In 2020, the Christopher Columbus statue was taken down.

== Notable natives and residents ==
- Former Speaker of the United States House of Representatives Nancy Pelosi grew up in Baltimore's Little Italy. Her father, Thomas D'Alesandro Jr., was mayor of the city.
- MLB Hall of Famer Jim Palmer owns a penthouse condominium in Little Italy, which he acquired in 2006, and uses when he's in Baltimore doing broadcasting work.

== Literary and dramatic references ==
- In Homicide: Life on the Street, fictional detective Al Giardello was raised in Little Italy, as it was the neighborhood inhabited by his father's side of the family. Giardello's mother's side of the family was from a neighboring African American housing project called the Perkins Homes.
- Nora Roberts' book Blue Smoke was set in Baltimore's Little Italy, as is the film adaptation.

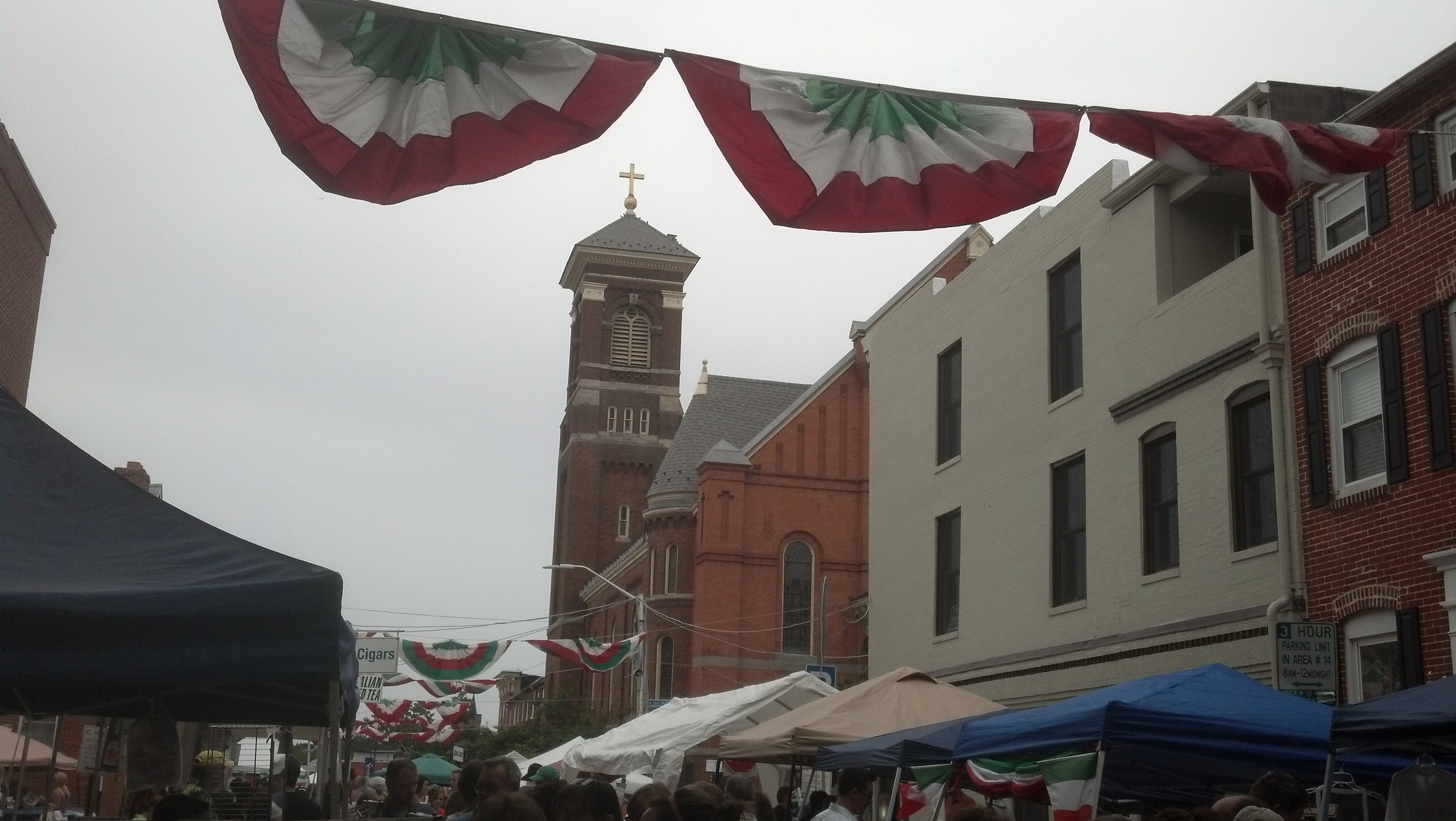
St. Leo's Church during the Feast of St. Gabriel, September 2013.

== Transportation ==
Little Italy is located three blocks south of the Shot Tower/Market Place Baltimore Metro Subway station. The southern terminus of the Jones Falls Expressway (I-83) is just north of the neighborhood.

== See also ==
- History of the Italians in Baltimore
