= Lexington, Baltimore =

Neighborhood in Baltimore, Maryland, US

Coordinates: 39°17′27″N 76°39′5″W

Lexington is a neighborhood in Baltimore, Maryland, United States. It is bordered by West Mulberry St to the north, West Baltimore St to the south, Monroe St to the east, and Warwick Ave to the west. The neighborhood consists primarily of rowhouses. It also encompasses Grace Medical Center, Bentalou Elementary School and Bentalou Recreation Center.

== See also ==
- List of Baltimore neighborhoods
- Lexington Market
