= History of Czechs in Baltimore =

The history of Czechs in Baltimore dates back to the mid-19th century. Thousands of Czechs immigrated to East Baltimore during the late 19th and early 20th centuries, becoming an important component of Baltimore's ethnic and cultural heritage. The Czech community has founded a number of cultural institutions to preserve the city's Czech heritage, including a Roman Catholic church, a heritage association, a gymnastics association, an annual festival, a language school, and a cemetery. During the height of the Czech community in the late 19th century and early 20th century, Baltimore was home to 12,000 to 15,000 people of Czech birth or heritage. The population began to decline during the mid-to-late 20th century, as the community assimilated and aged, while many Czech Americans moved to the suburbs of Baltimore. By the 1980s and early 1990s, the former Czech community in East Baltimore had been almost entirely dispersed, though a few remnants of the city's Czech cultural legacy still remain.

== Demographics ==
Czech population in Baltimore
Year	Number
1870	1,000
1880	5,000
1920	7,750
1930	7,652
1940	4,031
2000	2,206
2013	1,290

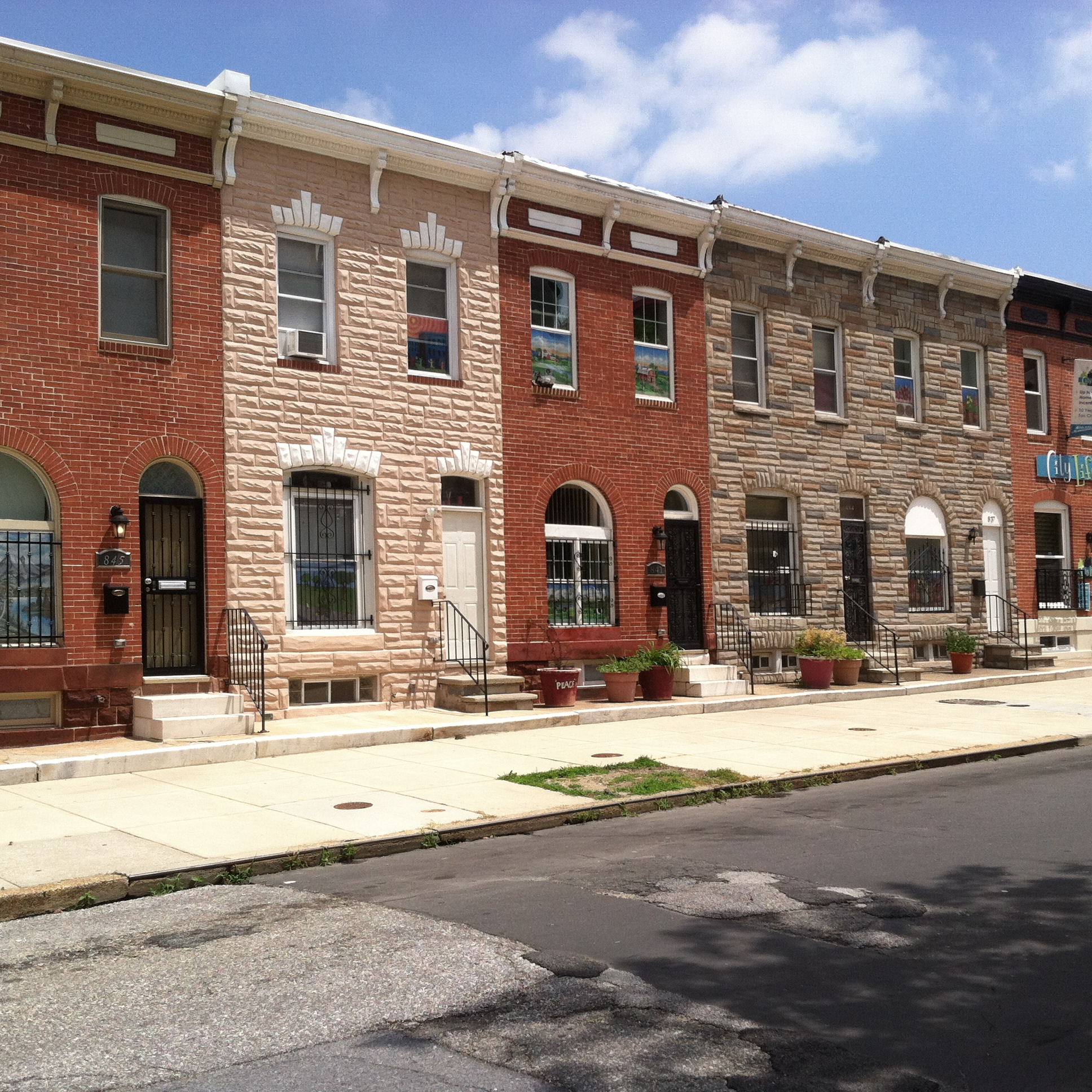
Baltimore's former Little Bohemia, East Monument Historic District, June 2014.

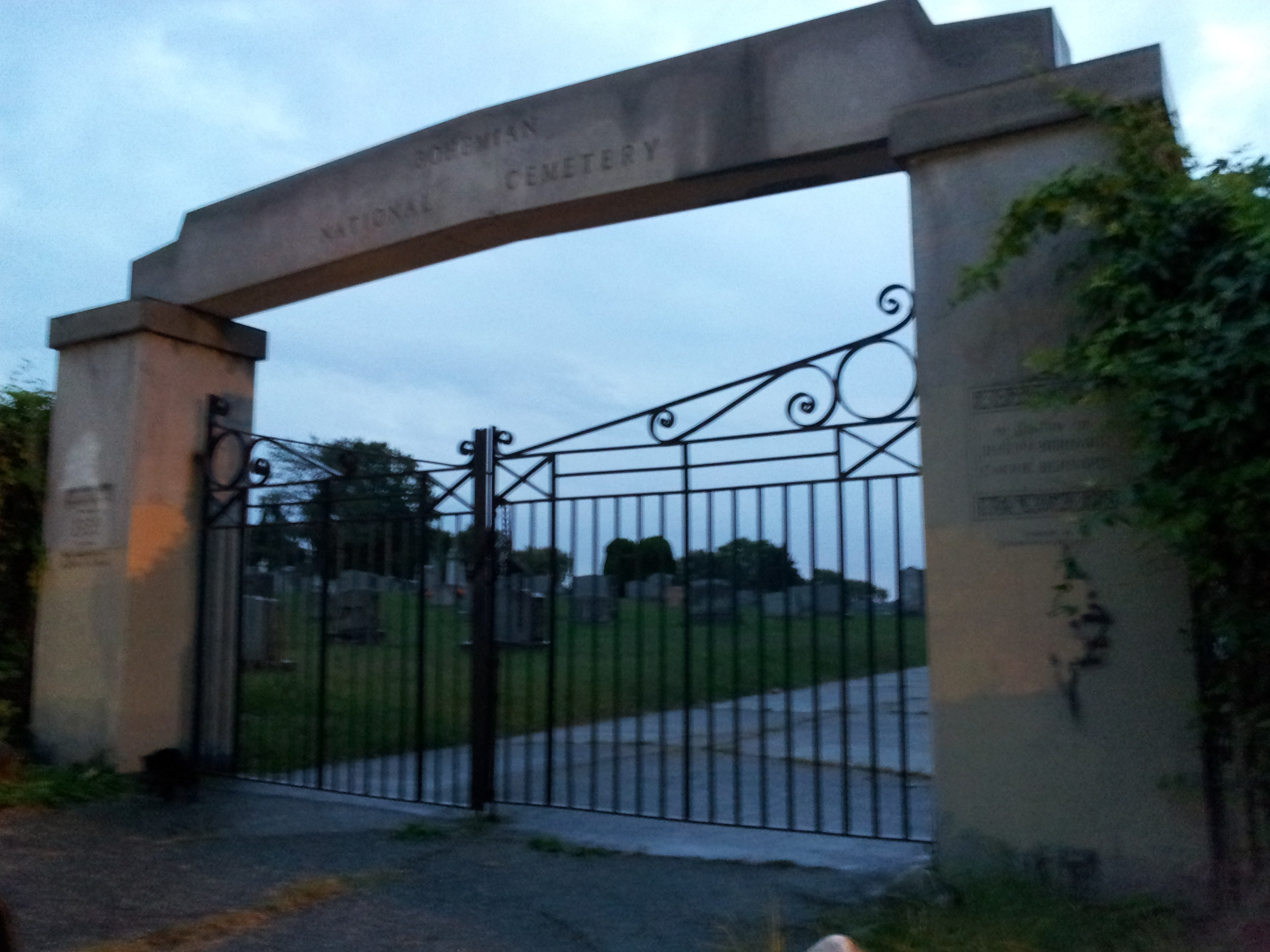
Bohemian National Cemetery, Armistead Gardens, October 2012.

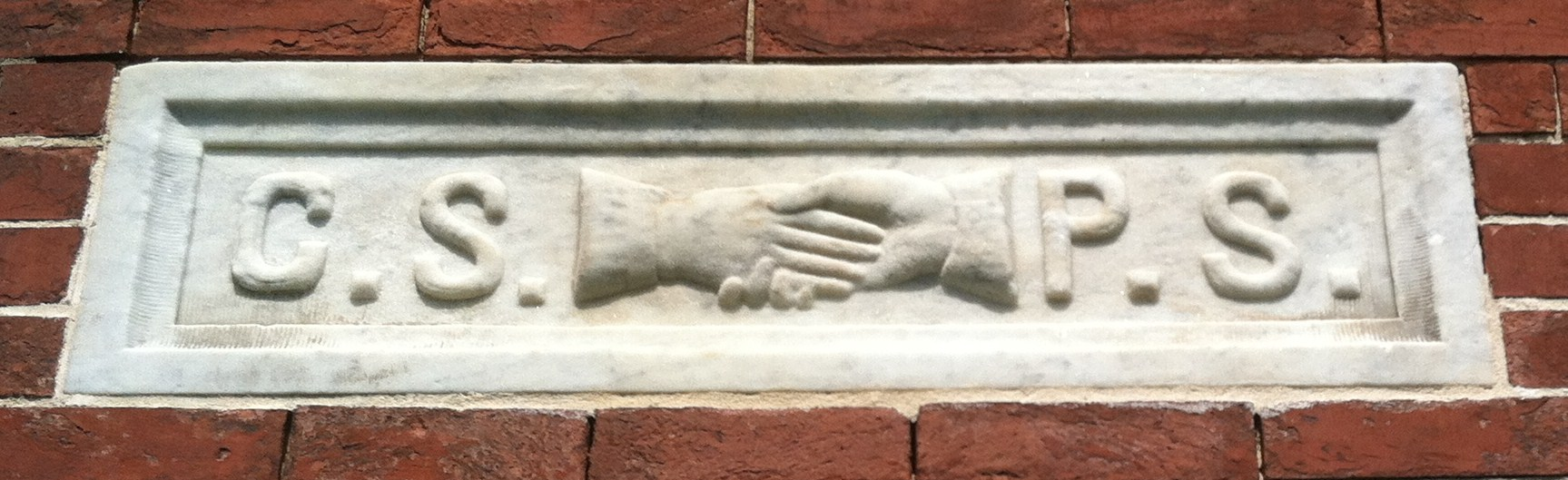
Grand Lodge Č.S.P.S. plaque on a crypt at Bohemian National Cemetery, June 2014.

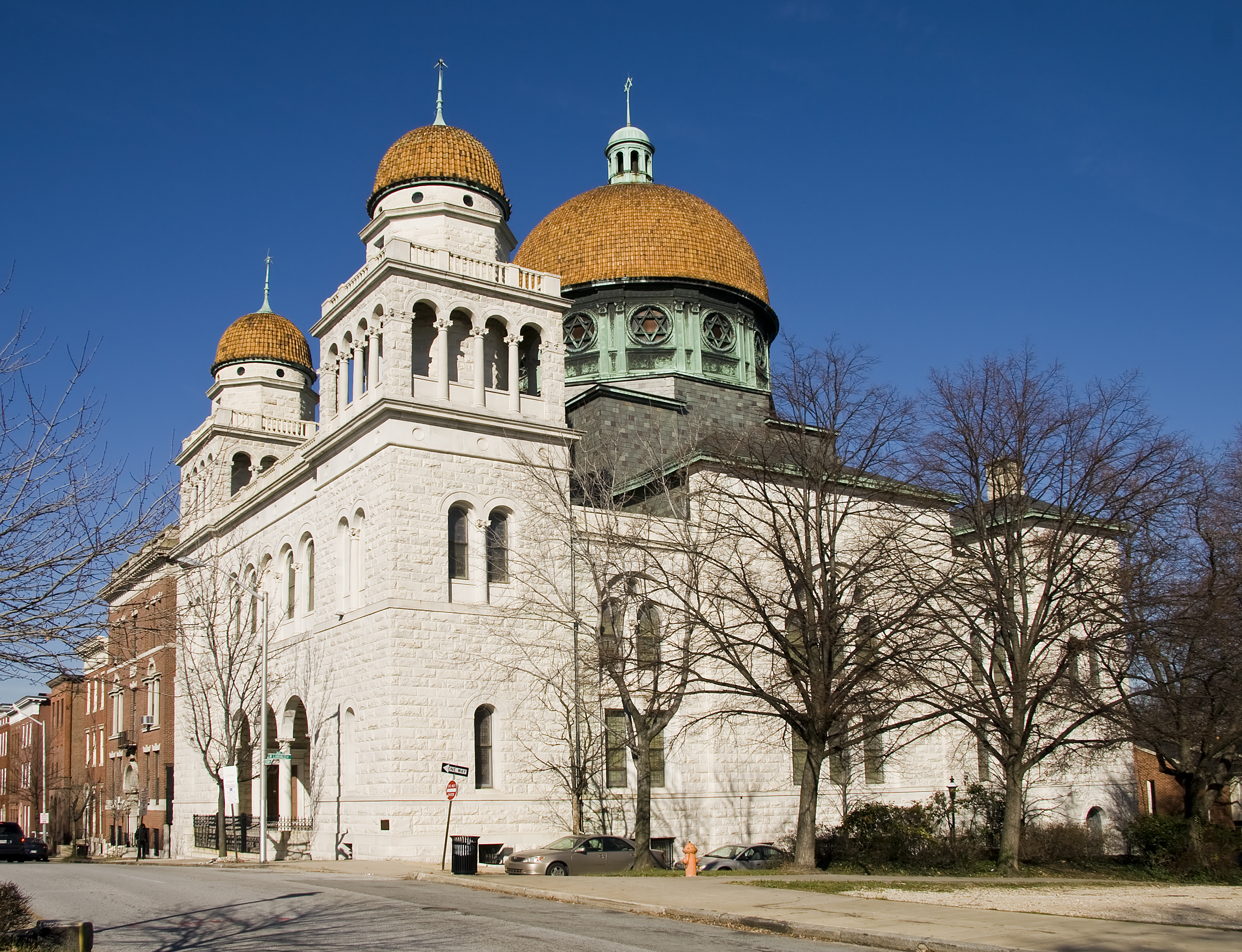
Eutaw Place Temple, a synagogue built by Temple Oheb Shalom, December 2011.

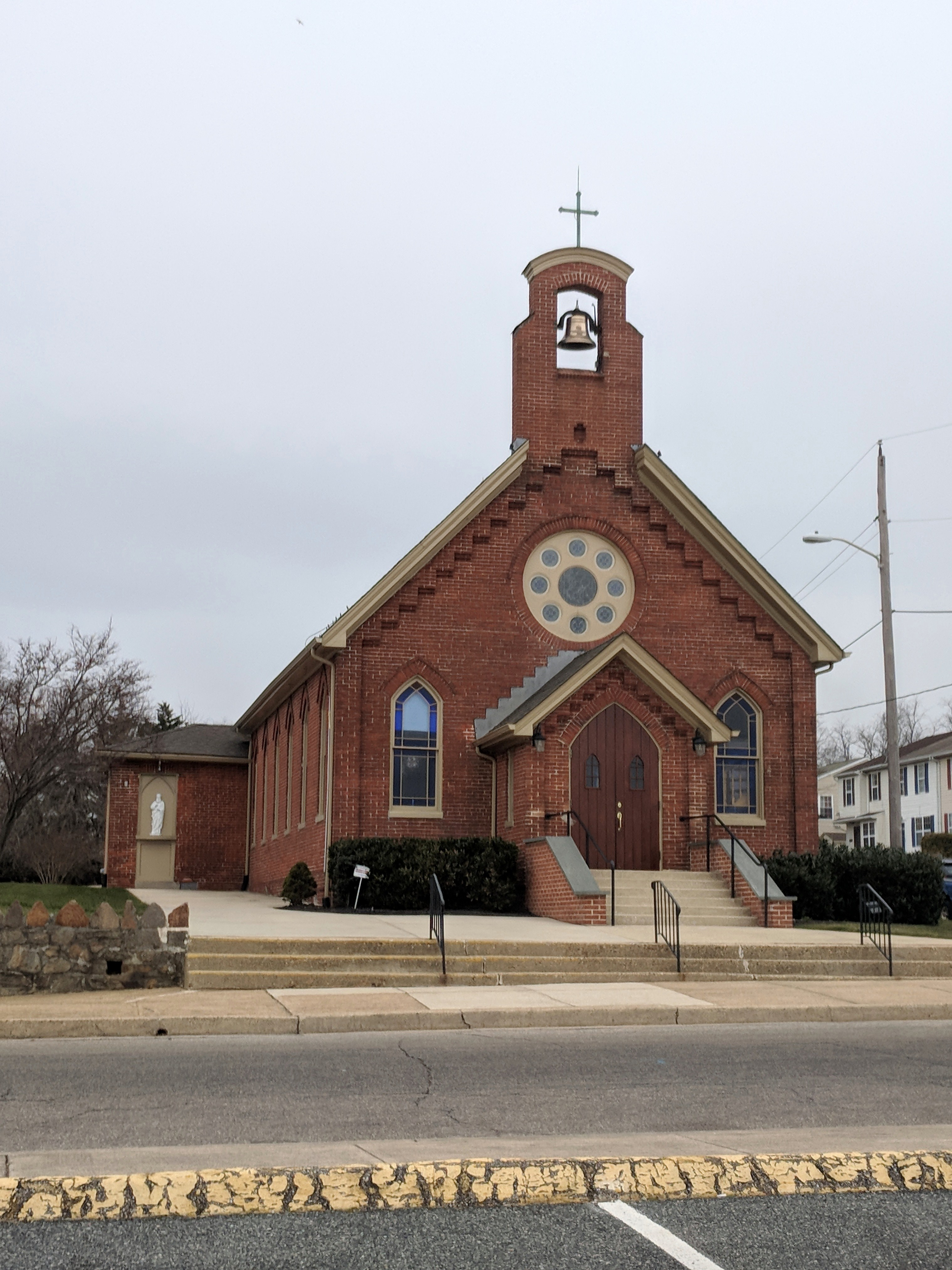
St. Athanasius Roman Catholic Church, in Curtis Bay, March 2018.

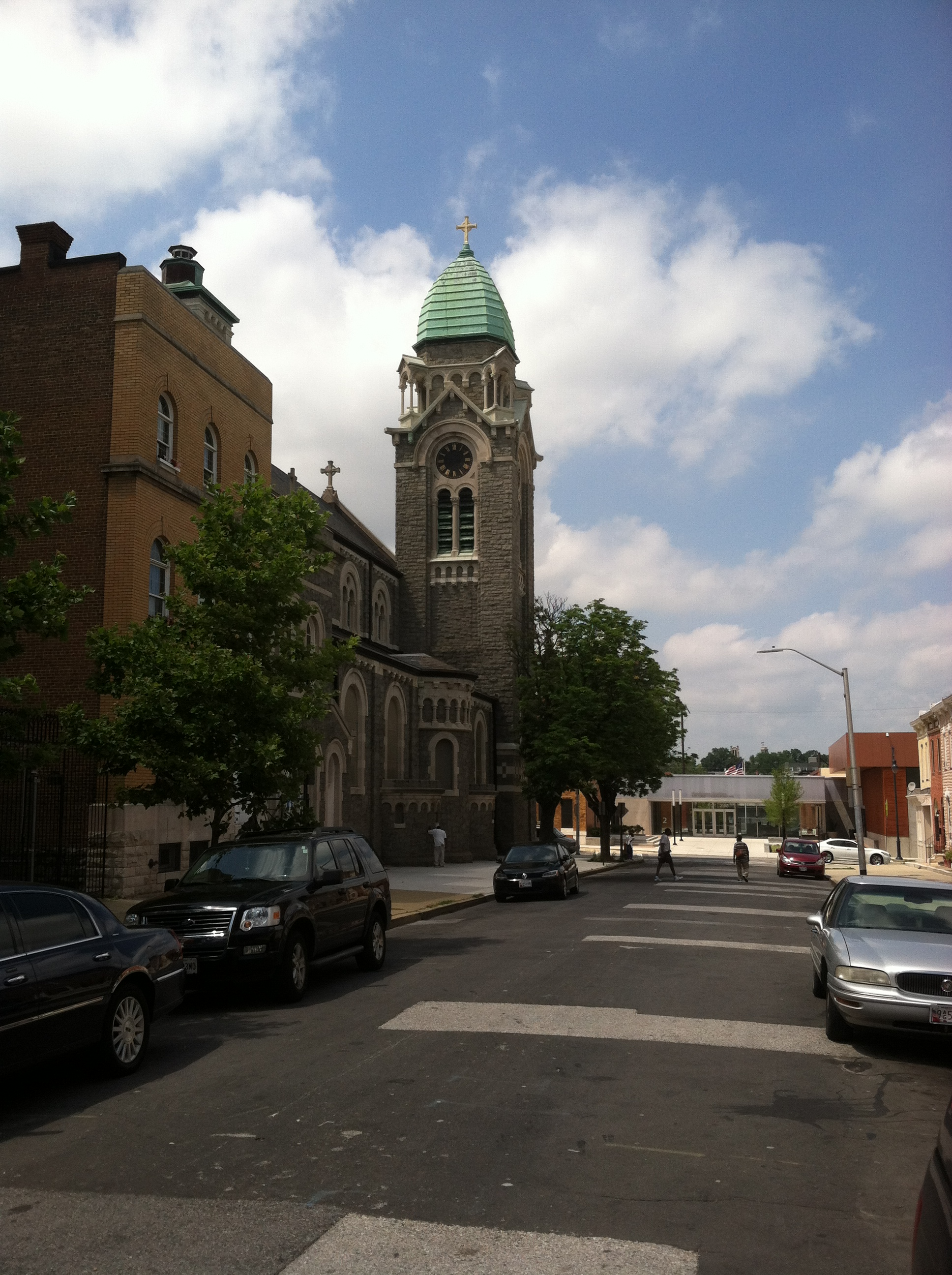
St. Wenceslaus Church, June 2014.

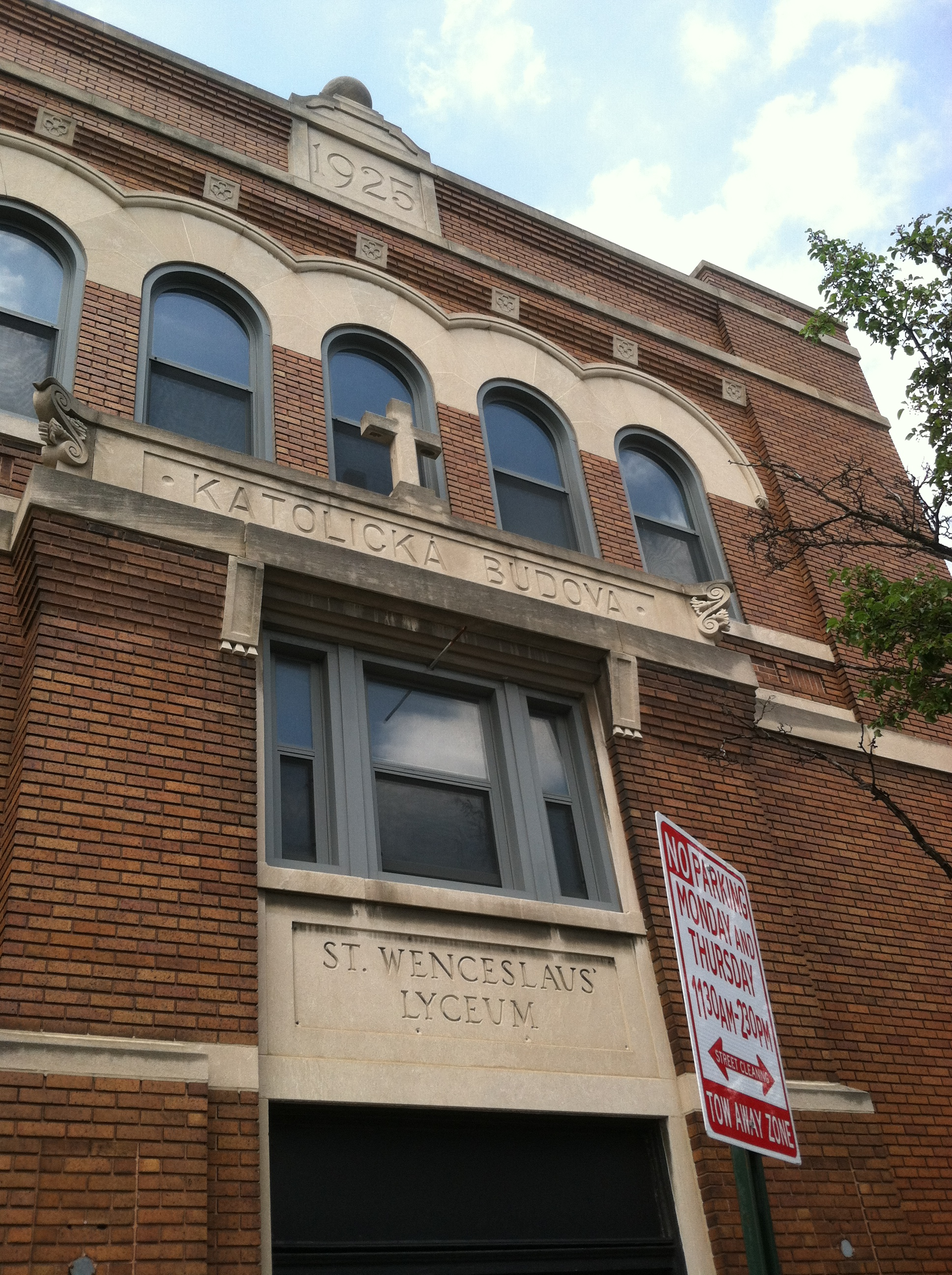
St. Wenceslaus Lyceum, June 2014.

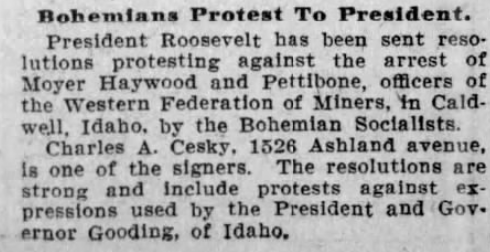
A July 20, 1906 article in The Baltimore Sun about Bohemian Socialists, including Charles A. Cesky of 1526 Ashland Avenue, writing a letter of protest to President Theodore Roosevelt regarding the Moyer-Haywood-Pettibone trial.

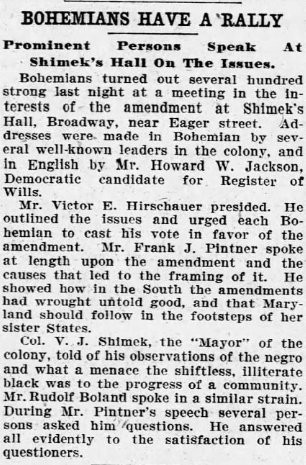
The Telegrafs co-owner Venceslaus J. Shimek and other Bohemians hold a racist rally in favor of the anti-Black Digges Amendment, Baltimore Sun, November 1, 1909.

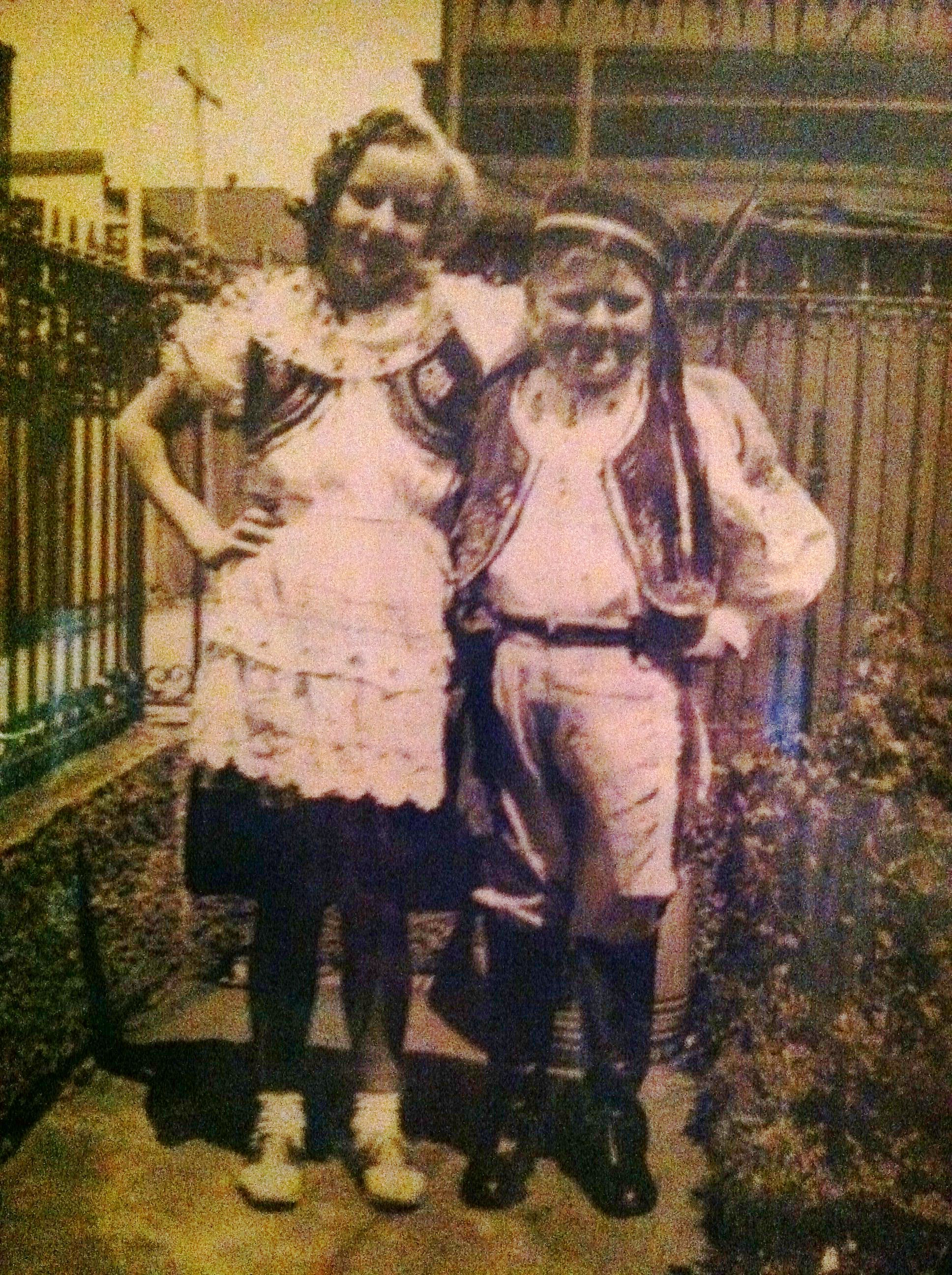
A Bohemian brother and sister in the backyard of their home/barbershop on Montford Avenue in Baltimore's Little Bohemia during the 1930s. They are wearing Czech traditional clothing.

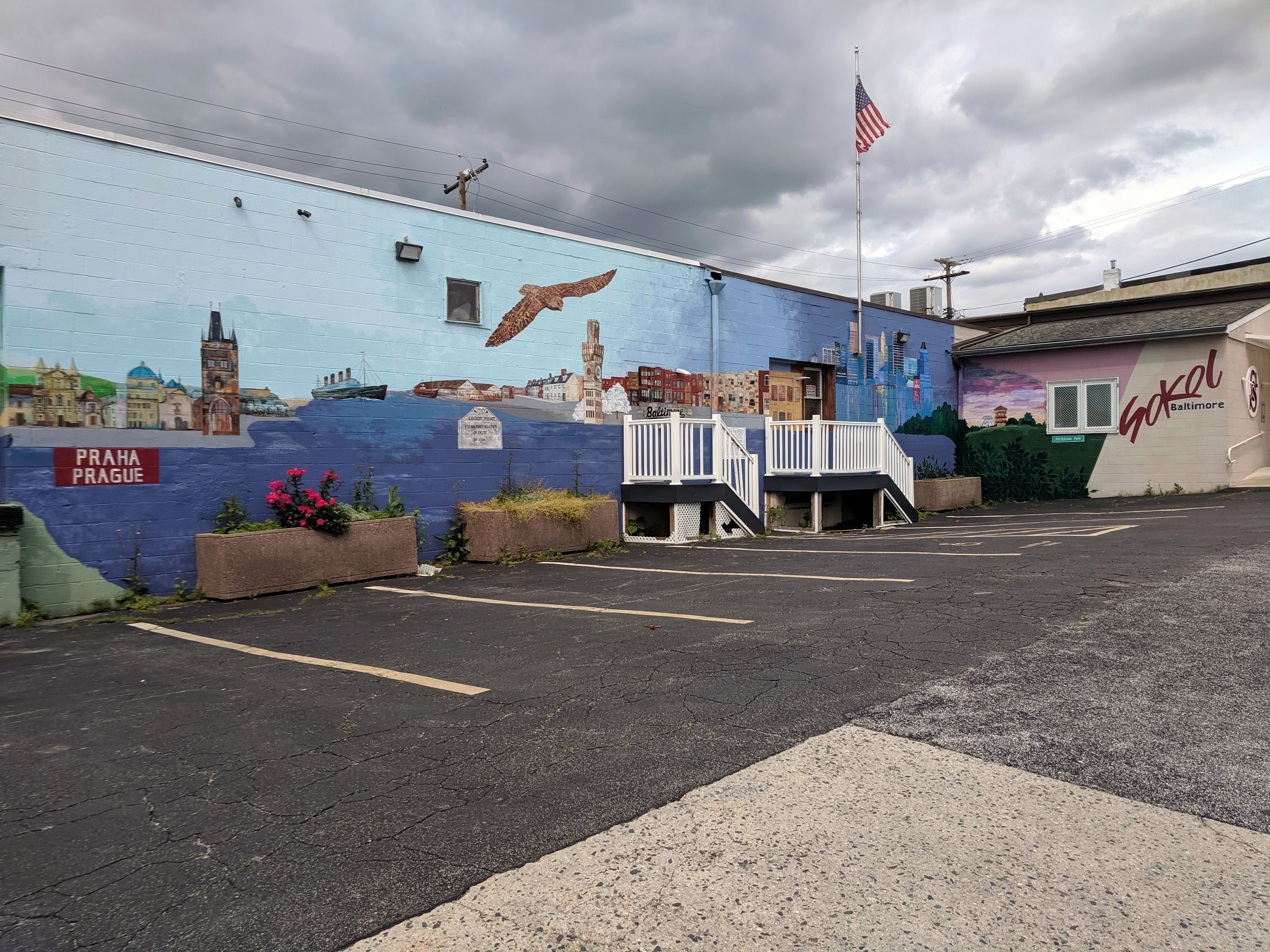
Sokol Baltimore headquarters on Noble Street in the Patterson Park neighborhood.

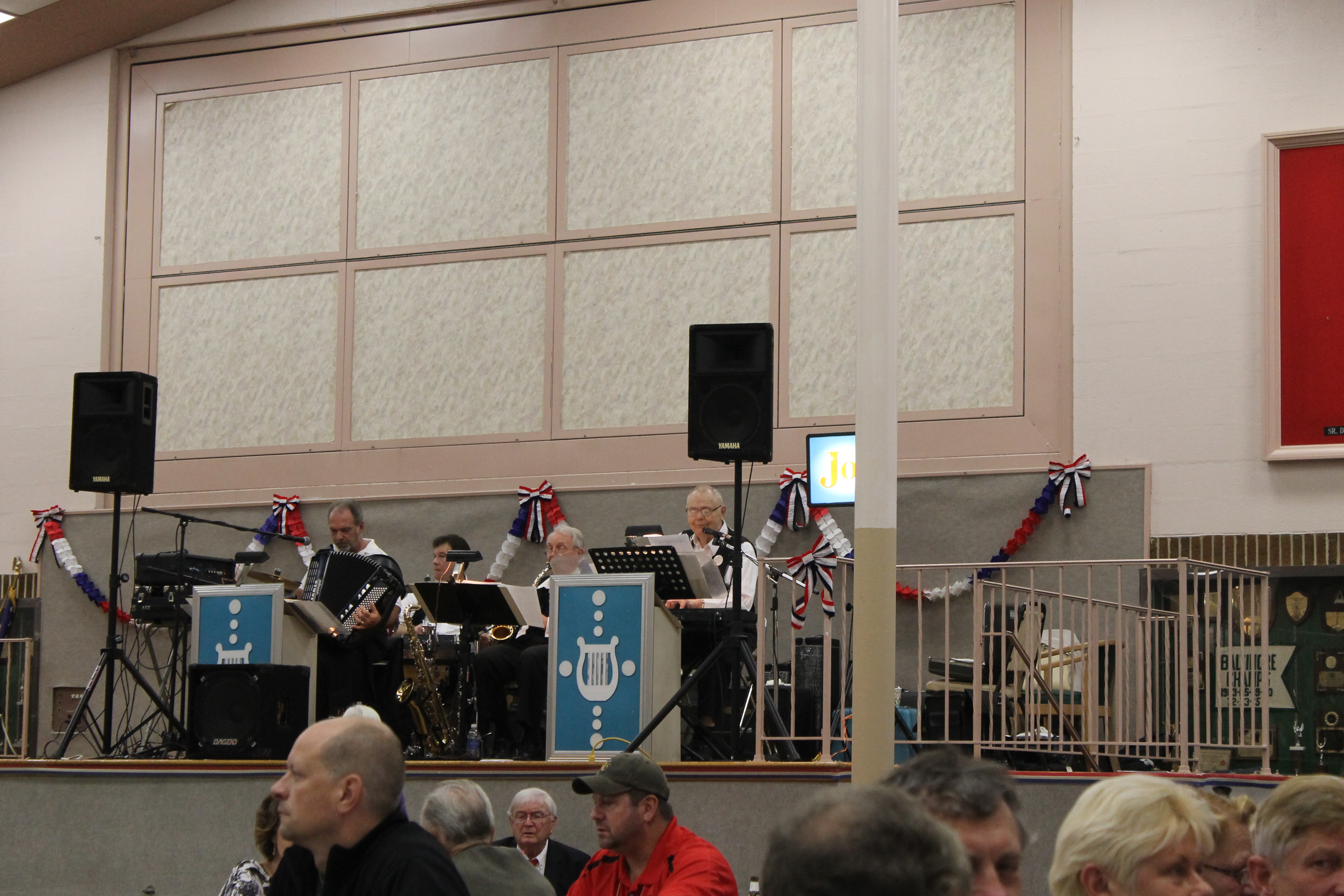
Joy of Maryland, a Czech and Polish polka band at the twenty-eighth annual Czech and Slovak Heritage Festival, Parkville, Maryland, October 2014.

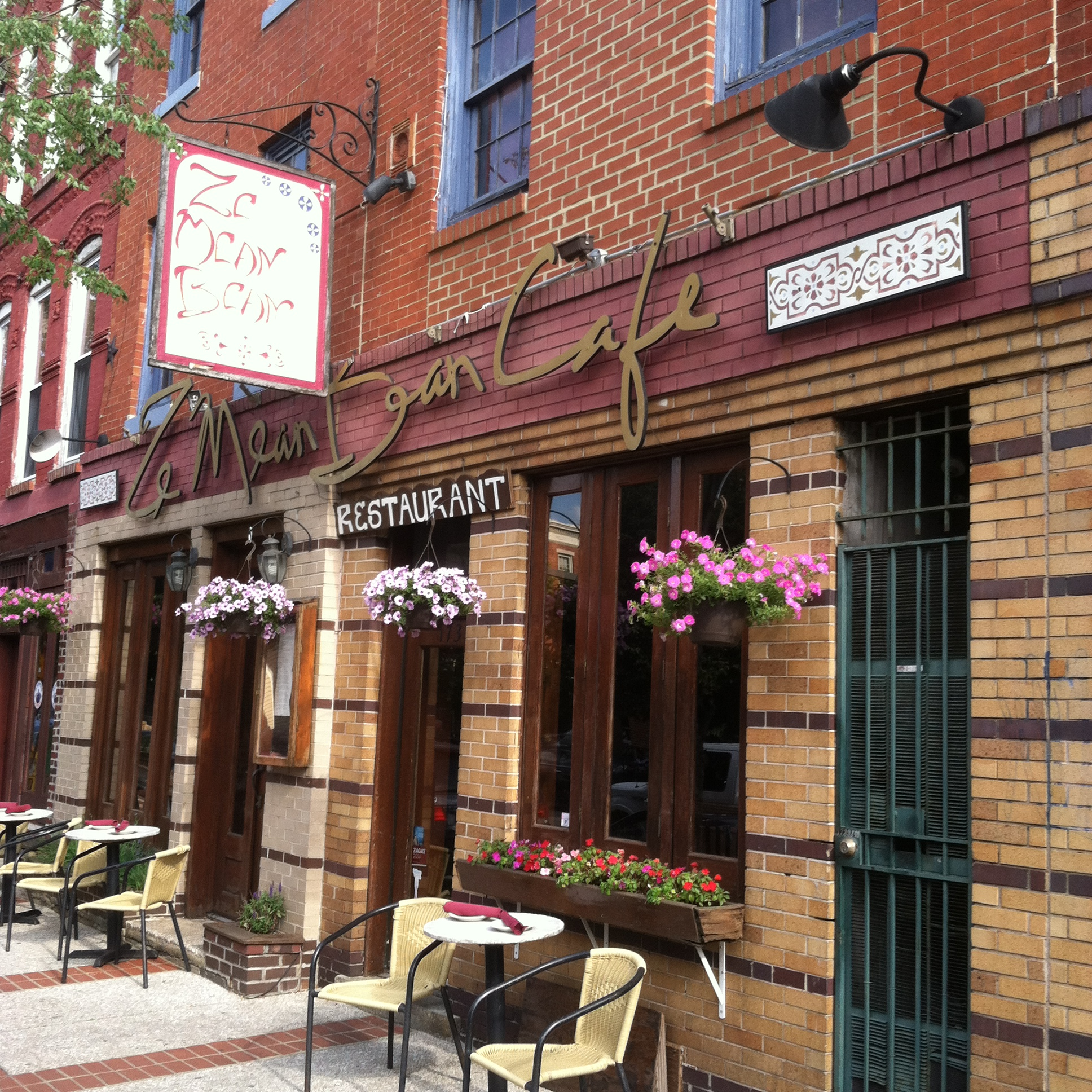
Ze Mean Bean Café, Fell's Point, June 2014.

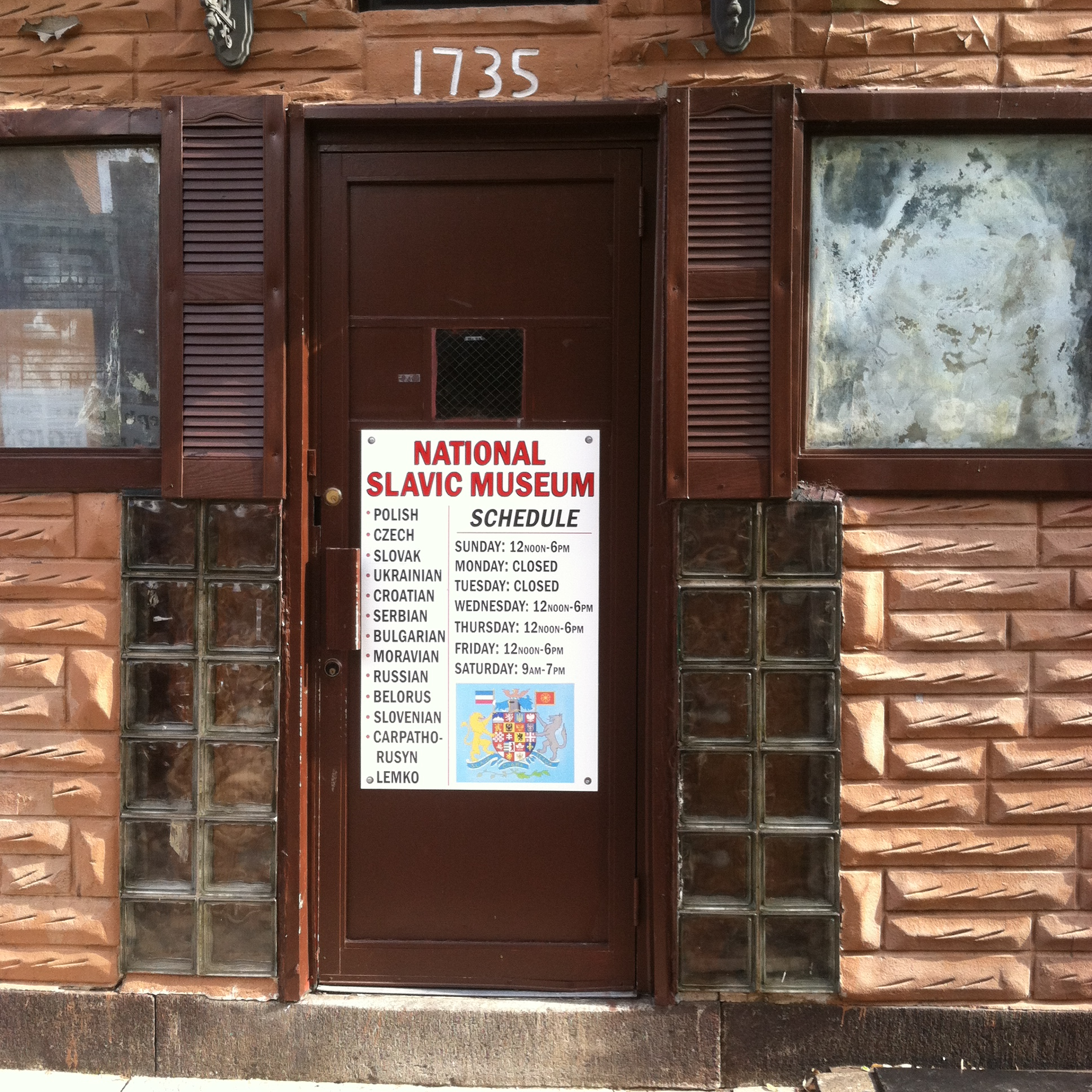
National Slavic Museum, Fell's Point, June 2014.

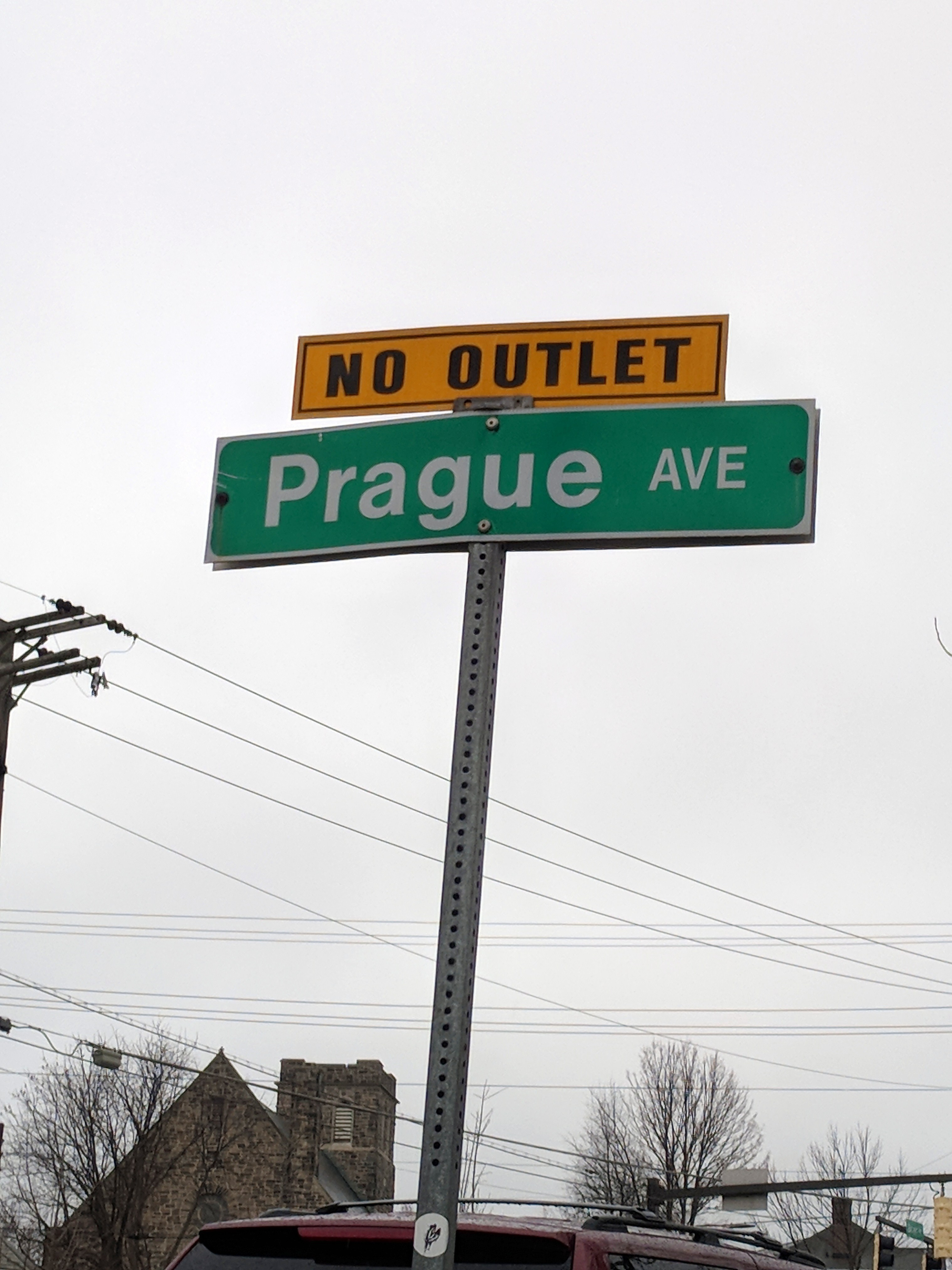
Prague Avenue, Baltimore, April 2018.

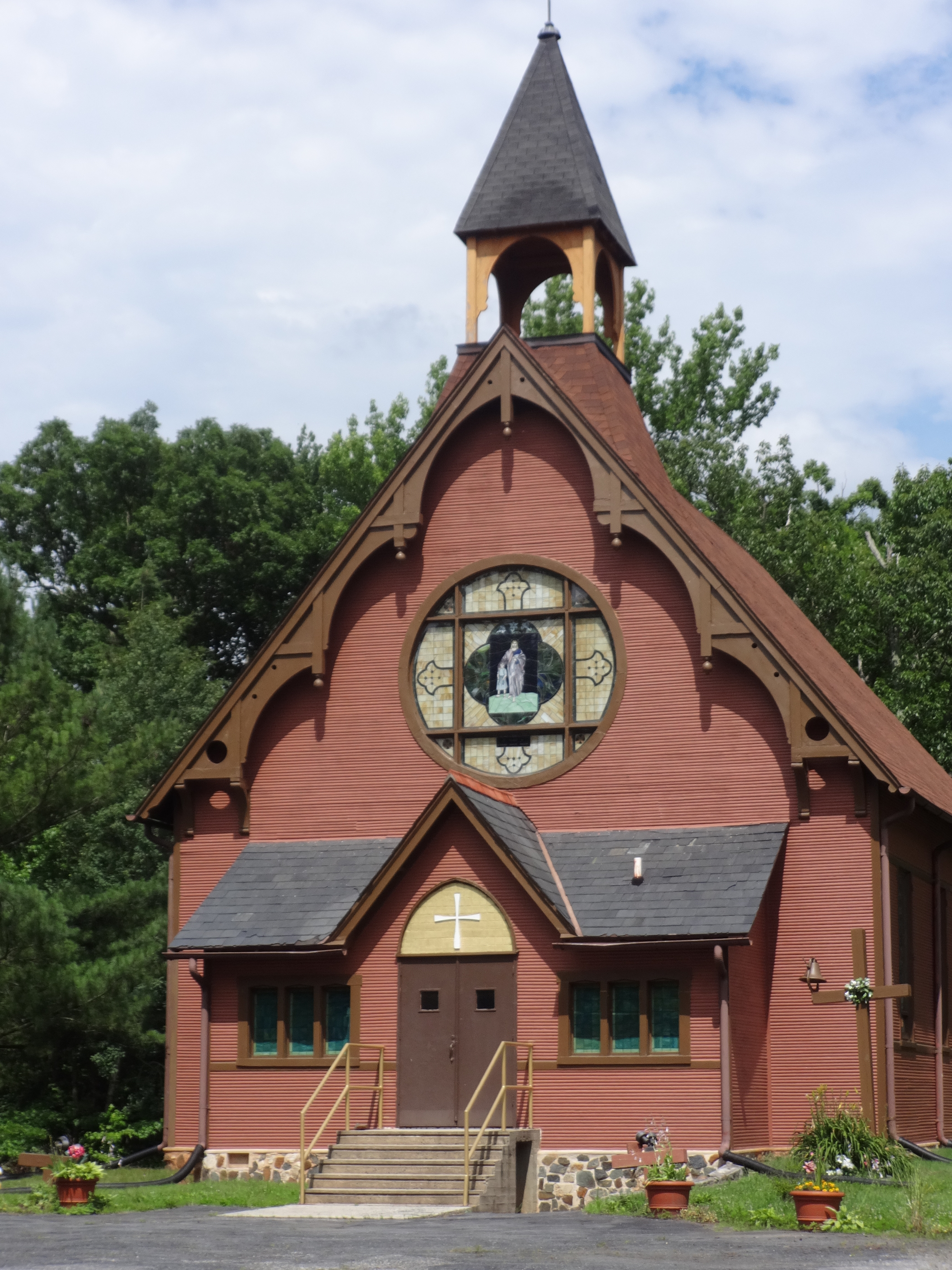
Historic St. Mary's Catholic Church in Fallston, Maryland, the site of the annual Baltimore Slavic Heritage Festival, December 2014.

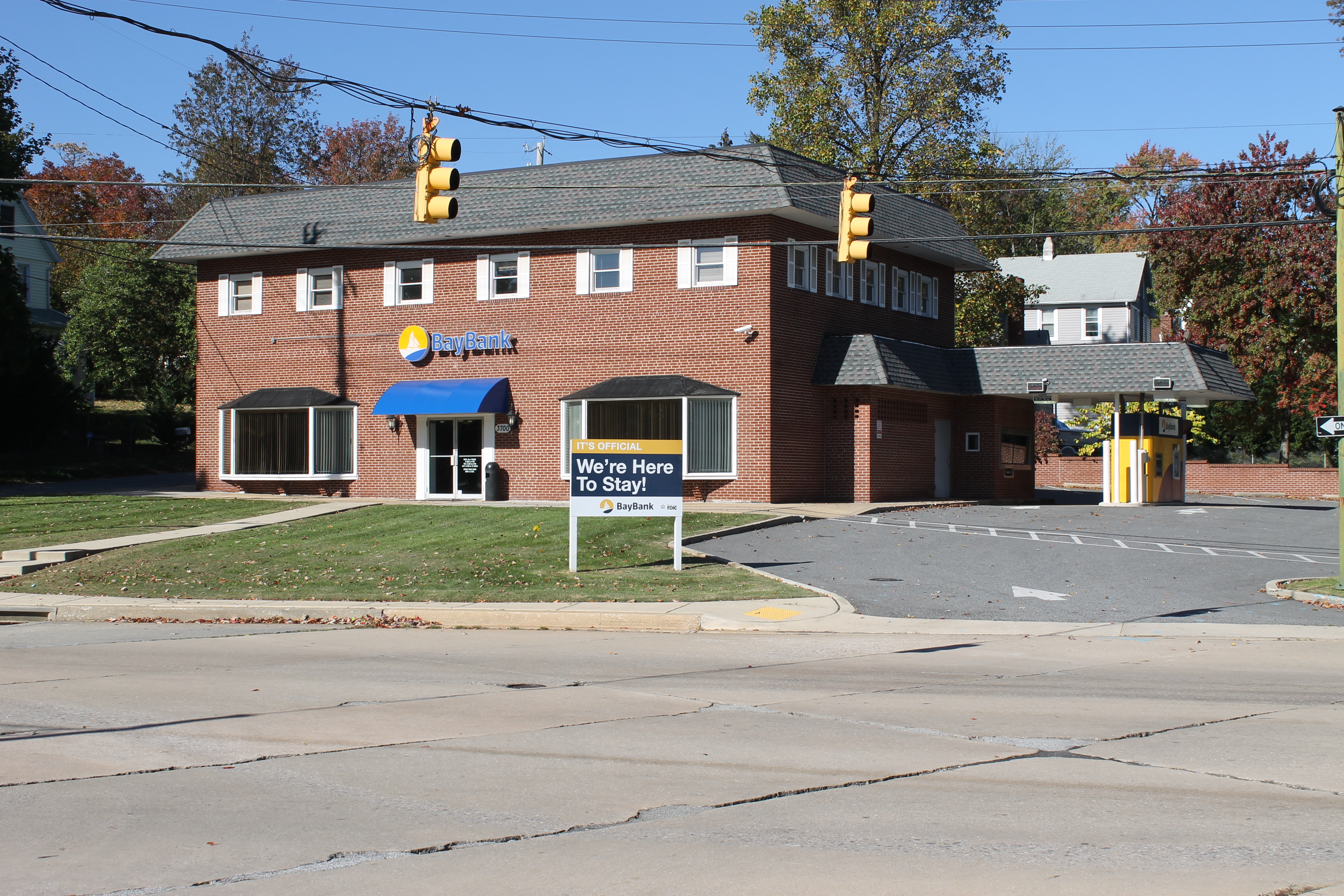
The newly opened Bay Bank of Parkville, formerly Slavie Federal Savings Bank, October 2014.

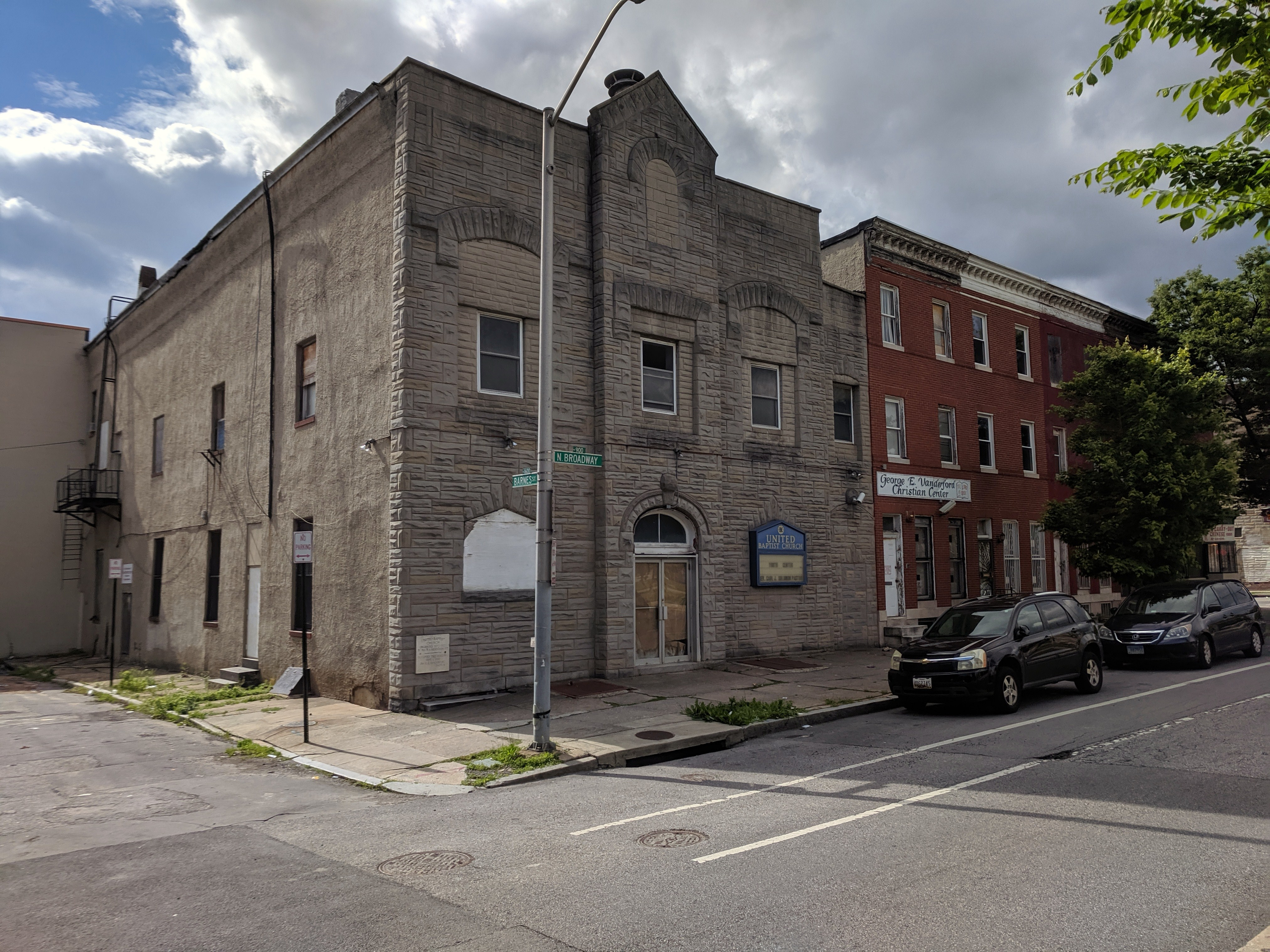
Abandoned building at Barnes and Broadway in the Gay Street neighborhood, former location of Shimek's Bohemian Hall and the United Baptist Church, May 2019.

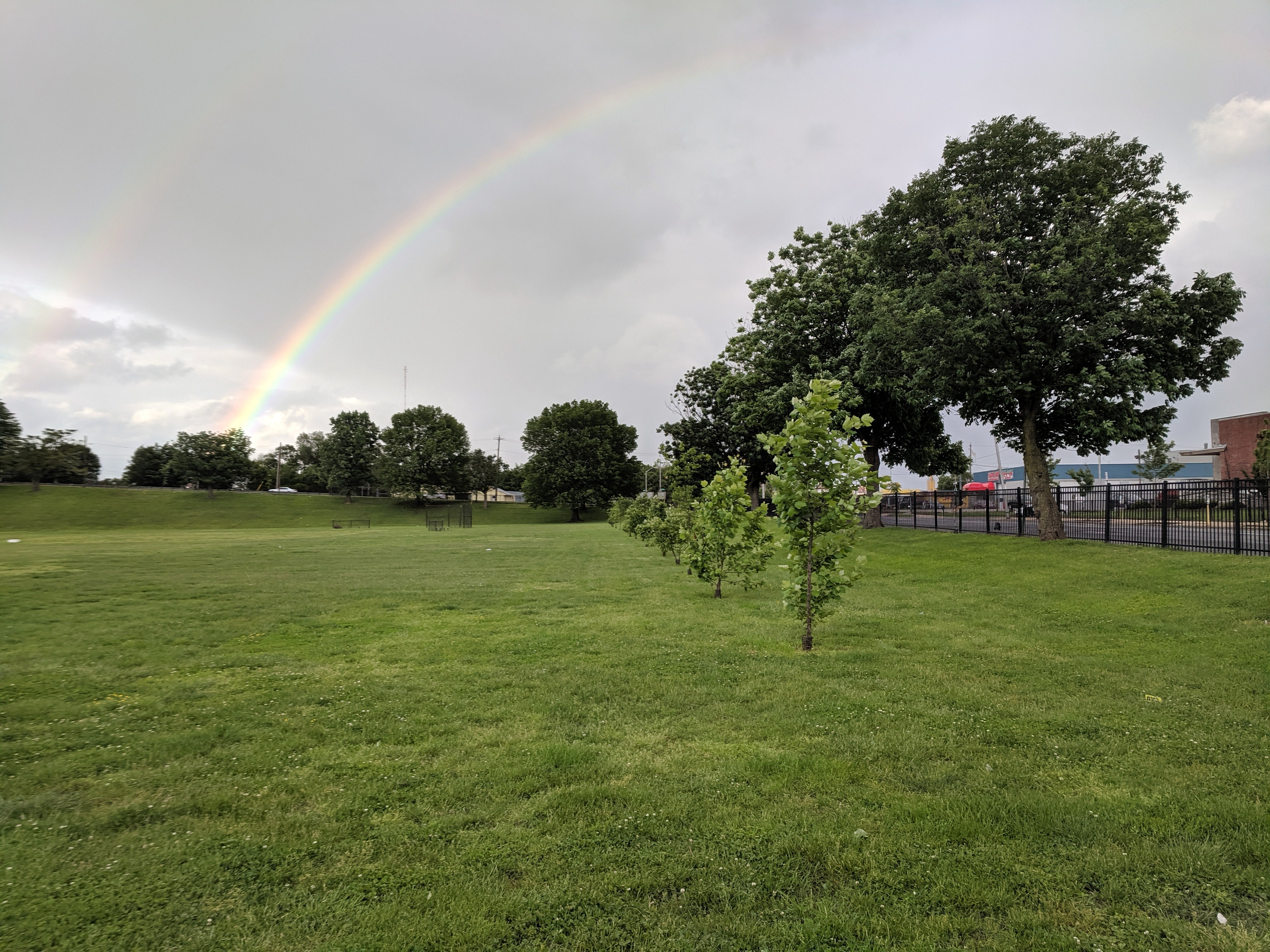
Frank C Bocek Park in Madison-Eastend, May 2019.

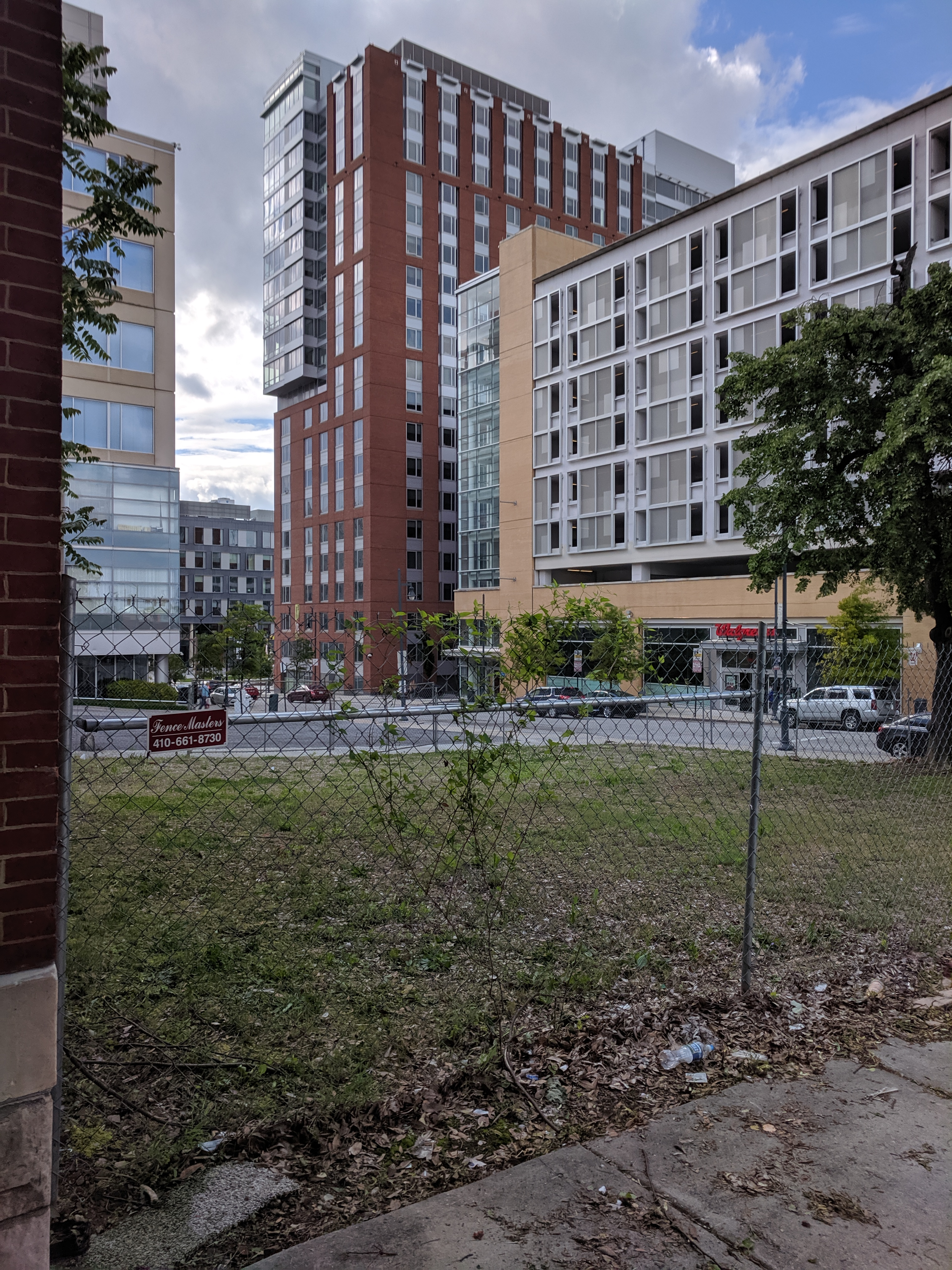
Former location of the demolished building that housed Bohemian and Moravian Presbyterian Church and Freedom Temple AME Zion Church, May 2019.

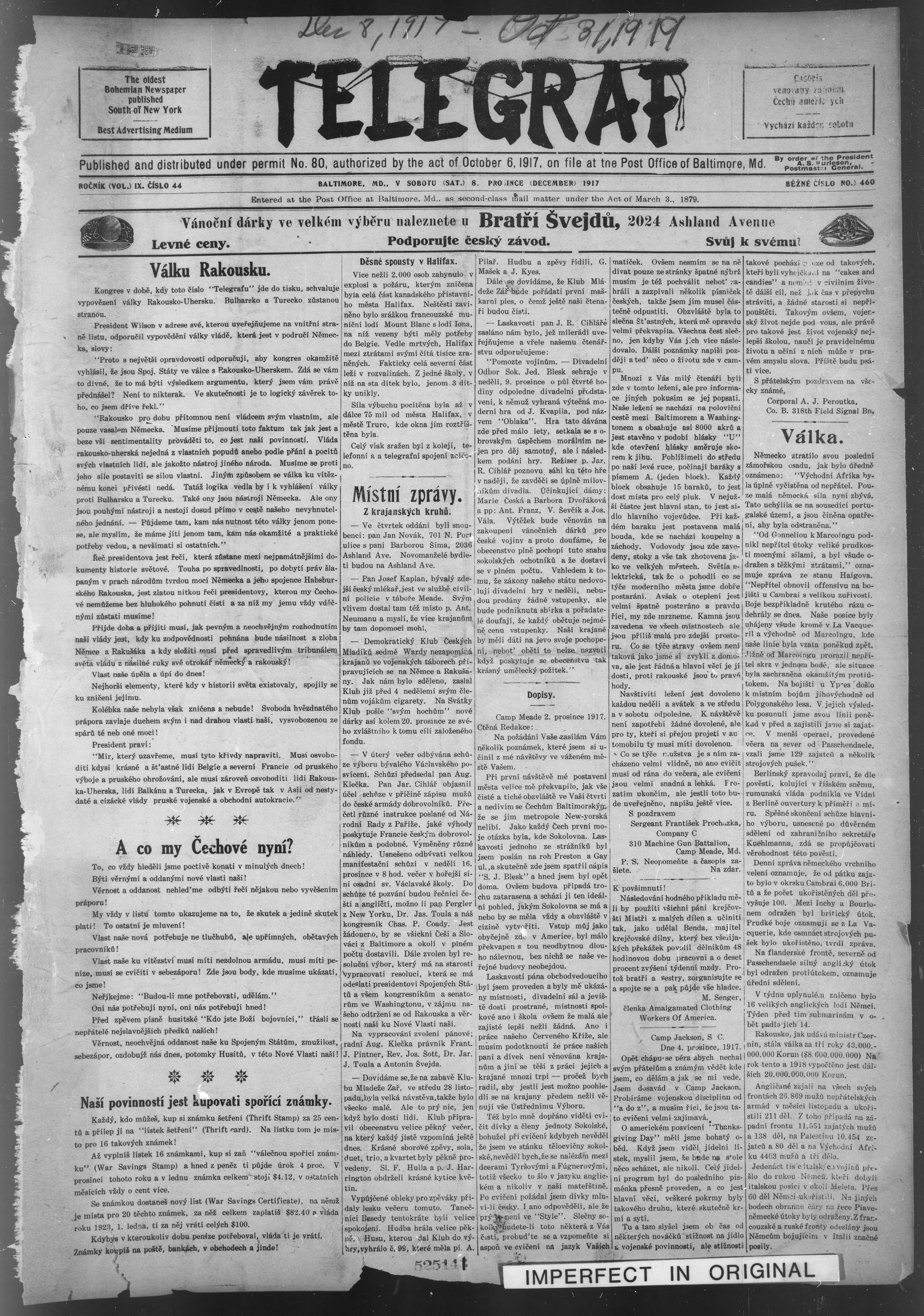
The cover page for the December 8, 1917 issue of Telegraf

The first wave of Czech immigrants arrived in Baltimore in 1850.

By 1870, there were approximately 1,000 Czech Catholics in Baltimore. Within a decade that number increased to over 5,000. In 1870 there were 766 Bohemian-born residents of Baltimore, making Bohemia the third largest source of immigration to Baltimore after the United Kingdom of Great Britain and Ireland and Germany.

In 1880, Bohemians made up a small portion of the foreign-born population of Baltimore at 2% of all foreign born residents. 16.9% (56,354) of Baltimore was foreign born, 1,127 of them Bohemian.

According to the US Immigration Office, the Baltimore Czech community numbered around 10,000 people between 1882 and 1910.

In the 1920 United States census, there were 7,750 Czechs, making Baltimore the fifth largest city for Czechs in the United States. Only Chicago, New York City, Cleveland, and St. Louis had larger Czech populations. In the same year 3,348 foreign-born white people in Baltimore spoke Czech as their mother tongue, making Czech the third most common mother tongue of immigrants among Slavic and Baltic languages, after Polish and Russian. During the same year, 7,000 Czech Roman Catholics belonged to the St. Wenceslaus Roman Catholic parish.

By the 1930 United States census, the Baltimore Czech population decreased slightly to number 7,652 people.

In 1940, 1,816 immigrants from Czechoslovakia lived in Baltimore. These immigrants comprised 3% of the city's foreign-born white population. In total, 4,031 people of Czech birth or descent lived in the city, comprising 2.9% of the foreign-stock white population.

In the 1960 United States census, Czech-Americans comprised 57.5% of the foreign-born population in Southeast Baltimore's tract 7–3. The Czech community was then centered in Baltimore's Ward 7. The city as a whole was home to 4,077 people of Czechoslovak origin.

According to the 1990 United States census almost 22,000 Americans of fully Czech or Slovak ancestry lived in Maryland, most of whom lived in or near Baltimore.

The Czech community in the Baltimore metropolitan area numbered 17,798 as of 2000, making up 0.7% of the area's population. In the same year Baltimore city's Czech population was 2,206, 0.3% of the city's population. 27,603 people of Czech descent lived in the greater Baltimore–Washington metropolitan area.

As of 2011, immigrants from the Czech Republic were the fifty-eighth largest foreign-born population in Baltimore.

In 2013, an estimated 1,290 Czech-Americans resided in Baltimore city, 0.2% of the population.

== History ==
=== 18th and 19th centuries ===
The first Bohemian Jew to arrive in Baltimore, Jacob Block (originally Bloch), immigrated in the late 1700s. The Bloch family were from the village of Švihov in Central Bohemia. The second Bohemian Jew in Maryland was Levi Collmus, a dry goods dealer from Prague, who arrived at the Port of Baltimore in September, 1806. Collmus was an elector to the Baltimore Hebrew Congregation, a treasurer of the United Hebrew Benevolent Society, and veteran of the War of 1812. Collmus was buried at Green Mount Cemetery according to Orthodox Jewish ritual. Between 1820 and the Civil War, around 300,000 Central European Jews arrived in the United States, many of whom were Bohemian Jews. Around 10,000 of these Jews, many of them Bohemian, passed through Fell's Point and settled in Baltimore.

In 1853, Temple Oheb Shalom was founded by Jewish immigrants from Central Europe, including Czechoslovakia, Germany, and Hungary. The pioneer Reform rabbi Isaac Mayer Wise, born in Plesná, Bohemia, played an influential role in the establishment of the synagogue.

Early Czech immigrants to Baltimore came from the regions of Bohemia, Moravia and Silesia, which at the time were part of the Austrian Empire and later the Austro-Hungarian Empire. Because the United States Census Bureau counted the Czechs as "Austrians" until 1881, it is difficult to know an accurate count for Czech immigrants before that time. Even after 1881, many Czechs were still listed as Austrians or "Austro-Bohemians" because of their Austrian citizenship.

These early Bohemian immigrants to Baltimore in the years following the Civil War first settled in Fell's Point, then moved further north along Barnes and Abbott Streets near Broadway, eventually settling in large numbers along Collington Avenue near the Northeast Market.

The largest great wave of Czech immigrants occurred from the late 1800s through the early 1900s. Enough Czechs had immigrated by 1860 that a small colony was formed. The developing community was thriving by the 1870s (construction had commenced in 1867), which was known then as Little Bohemia or Bohemia Village. According to the Painted Screen Society of Baltimore, Little Bohemia was bounded by North Washington Street on the west, East Eager Street to the north, Jefferson Street to the south, and North Linwood Avenue to the east. Numerous rowhouses were built to accommodate the growing Bohemian community, which continued to grow throughout the 1880s and 1890s. The homes were constructed by Bohemian immigrants, most notably the architect Frank Novak (1877–1945). Many of the immigrants who settled here worked as weavers and tailors or owned market stalls. Novak did not want any streets named after him, but his partner fooled him by naming a street "Kavon", Novak spelled backwards. Kavon Street presently runs parallel to Bel Air Road directly north and south of Herring Run Park.

Prior to the passage of the Fair Housing Act of 1968, racially restrictive covenants were used in Baltimore to exclude African-Americans and other minority groups. A 1923 article in the Baltimore Sun mentions that Frank Novak built "restricted" houses in the Montebello neighborhood. A 1926 advertisement in the Baltimore Sun describes Novak's Lakeside development as a "carefully restricted suburban home development".

Between the 1860s and the 1910s, Bohemians chartered at least 20 building and loan associations. The first Bohemian organization was chartered in 1877, around 20 years after Bohemians started to arrive in the city in large numbers. Some of these associations were Jednota "Blesk", "Vlastimila" (sisters' benevolent union), the "Ctirada", the "Jaromíra", and the "Zlatá Praha" ("Golden Prague").

The majority of the Baltimore Bohemians were Roman Catholics. In 1870, there were around 1,000 Bohemian Catholics and within a decade that number had increased to over 5,000. The St. Wenceslaus parish was organized in 1872, in order to serve the needs of the growing population, becoming the Bohemian National Parish of the Roman Catholic Church in Baltimore.

Sokol Jednota Blesk (now called Sokol Baltimore), a Czech gymnastics association, was founded in 1872. Members met on Frederick Street near Fell's Point. Sokol (Czech: [ˈsokol], falcon) was originally a Czech nationalist organization created to train members to fight for the independence of Czechoslovakia and in some ways resembled the German Turnverein, German-American gymnastic clubs that promoted liberalism and German nationalism.

In August 1879, the Fairmount and Chapel Streets Permanent Building, Savings and Loan Association No 1 Inc. was founded to serve the needs of Czech immigrants. The bank was located on the second floor of Anton Rytina's Bar at 1919 East Fairmount Avenue. All bank records were written in Czech until 1948.

On November 8, 1880, the politician Vaclav Joseph Shimek helped establish the Grand Lodge Č.S.P.S. of Baltimore, the Baltimore chapter of the Czech-Slovak Protective Society. Shimek was the owner of the Bohemian Hall and the six-time president of Sokol Baltimore; he was also instrumental in helping found the National Sokol Organization. Shimek's Bohemian Hall, now the United Baptist Church at Barnes Street and Broadway, was located in the heart of Little Bohemia and was established as a meeting place for the Czech community. Shimek allowed the Hall to be used to hold Knights of Labor meetings for working-class Czech tailors and garment workers.

In 1884, the Grand Lodge Č.S.P.S. of Baltimore constructed the Bohemian National Cemetery, a cemetery for irreligious and Protestant Czechs and Slovaks. While the majority of Baltimore's Bohemians were Catholic, the Czech-Slovak Protective Society was largely composed of secular and religious freethinkers. The cemetery served as an alternative to the Catholic cemeteries where other Bohemians were buried.

During the 1890s, there were over 300 sweatshops in Baltimore, many providing sewing rooms for immigrants working in the garment industry. Most of the workers toiling in these squalid sweatshops were of Bohemian, Italian, Lithuanian, and Russian-Jewish ancestry. Around half of the garment workers were women and girls, many in their early teens.

In the late 1800s and early 1900s, the Bohemian stronghold north of Johns Hopkins Hospital along the Baltimore to New York Amtrak line all the way to Frank C Bocek Park was known by the now long-forgotten name of "Swampoodle". Frank C Bocek Park was nicknamed the "clay hill". There was a swamp behind the clay hill, the source of the neighborhood being named Swampoodle. The heart of the Bohemian "hollow" of Swampoodle was located just north of Johns Hopkins Hospital along the tiny side streets of Barnes and Abbott.

=== 20th century ===
During the early 1900s and mid-1900s, Little Bohemia was an ethnically diverse neighborhood, with many European immigrants such as Germans, Irish, and Italians living side by side with and intermarrying Czechs and Slovaks. One Slovak-American woman from a multiethnic family on North Bradford Street described her kitchen as "a league of nations around that dining-room table."

A newspaper geared towards the Czech community titled Palecek was established in 1902. The same year Sokol Baltimore moved to a new location at Shimek's Hall on North Broadway.

The Bohemian Building, Loan and Savings Association (also known as the Slavic Savings and Loan Association) was established in 1900, in order to serve the needs of Czech immigrants. The association was formed by twenty Bohemian men at Joseph Klecka's Tavern on Ashland Avenue. Two years later, in 1904, the Madison Bohemian Savings Bank was also founded in order to aid Czech immigrants, particularly the Czech farmers of the Hereford Zone of Northern Baltimore County. The mainstream banks during the 1800s and early 1900s would ignore or turn away customers who were Eastern European or Southern European immigrants, so Czechs and other non-WASP immigrants would establish their own banking institutions to serve the specific needs of their communities. These banks for white ethnics had hours and customs that seemed less alien to immigrants and often had translators on staff. Discrimination against Czechs and other white immigrants persisted in banking until the 1930s. As late as the 1930s and 1940s it was not uncommon for Slavic Catholics, such as Czechs and Poles, to be called ethnic and religious slurs such as "bohunks" and "fish eaters." Slavs were often stereotyped as stupid and superstitious. White Protestants coined the term "fish eater" to refer to Catholic immigrants because the Catholics did not eat meat on Fridays. The Baltimore journalist H. L. Mencken described Czech immigrants in Baltimore as "all poor and without influential compatriots uptown." He opposed the independence of Czechoslovakia, claiming that "Czechs are a charming people" but should have "kept to their own dunghill." He sympathized with Nazi Germany's aim "to get rid of the Czech nonsense at any cost." In 1939, he wrote that he was "a great deal less interested in what Hitler does to the Czechs...than I am in what he does to the Germans."

The Baltimore Telegraf, a Czech-language newspaper founded by Vaclav Shimek, began publication on February 20, 1909. The newspaper would continue in print until 1951.

Anti-Black racism was widespread in the Bohemian community throughout the 19th and 20th centuries. In 1909, the Telegraf and its co-owner Venceslaus J. Shimek endorsed the Digges Amendment, a defeated proposal to amend the Maryland Constitution to disenfranchise Black voters. An October 11, 1909, article in the Baltimore Sun stated that foreign-born white voters in Shimek's neighborhood of Baltimore were enthusiastic supporters of the amendment. Although some critics of the amendment were concerned it might be used to restrict the voting rights of foreign-born white people, Shimek wrote in the Telegraf that "...I am in favor of the amendment, heart and soul, and the Telegraf, of which I am president, is supporting it strongly." Shimek argued that Bohemians should support the amendment because only Black Americans would be disenfranchised. The Baltimore Sun summarized Shimek's argument as being that "No Bohemian need fear" because the law "will eliminate only the negro."

In 1911 or 1912, Bohemian socialists founded the Baltimore branch of the Bohemian Section of the Socialist Party of America. The Bohemian Socialists were in close association with the Social Democratic Party of Bohemia.

The Golden Prague Federal Savings & Loan Association was founded in 1912. The bank was created to aid the Czech community, but later expanded to serve non-Czechs as well.

A Czech immigrant living in Little Bohemia named William Oktavec invented screen painting in 1913. Screen painting became a popular form of folk art in Baltimore's working-class immigrant communities. During the peak of screen painting in the 1930s and 1940s there were approximately 100,000 painted screens by over 100 artists.

In 1914, the Bohemian Catholics built the church of St. Wenceslaus Church, Baltimore, which by now had 7,000 members. St. Wenceslaus held services in both Czech and English. At its height in 1920, the parish was the fourth largest Roman Catholic Archdiocese of Baltimore.

In 1915, August Klecka, son of Joseph Klecka, became the first Czech-American to be elected to the Baltimore City Council. Klecka represented Czech voters and ran the Slavic Building and Loan Association.

During World War I (1914–1918), most of Baltimore's garment industry workers were still of Bohemian, Lithuanian, and Russian descent, the majority of whom were Jewish and many of whom were young women.

When the independence of Czechoslovakia was declared on October 18, 1918, the Czech and Slovak communities in Baltimore joined in the celebrations and for many years held annual festivities and parades commemorating Czechoslovakia's Independence Day.

Many working-class Central and Eastern European immigrants, including Czechs, settled in the Curtis Bay neighborhood in the late 1800s and early 1900s, where many attended the St. Athanasius Roman Catholic Church. However, by 1925 the church had become majority Polish as many Polish immigrants settled in the neighborhood.

With further construction in Little Bohemia the Czech community continued to grow. By 1927, the construction was finished in Little Bohemia. As the Czech population continued to expand, Czechs began to move into Patterson Park and became an important component of the neighborhood's growth.

The Czechoslovak Society of America founded a duckpin bowling league in 1946. Many of the early members were Czech-American soldiers returning from World War II.

During WWII, many Czech and Slovak coal-miners from Pennsylvania settled in South Baltimore, particularly in Curtis Bay. Many of these Czechs and Slovaks from Pennsylvania joined the St. Athanasius Roman Catholic Church, adding to the number of Czech congregants that already attended the church. The church still had a number of Czech-American members by 2003. Czech-Americans and Slovak-Americans in Baltimore during WWII were strongly opposed to Adolf Hitler and the German occupation of Czechoslovakia.

After the War, Czechs and Slovaks concentrated in the Collington Avenue area began to move out of the neighborhood and dispersed widely across Baltimore city.

During the 1950s, many Czech-Americans began to disperse from Little Bohemia while many African-Americans began to move into the area.

In 1954, Sokol Jednota Blesk moved its organization to a new building on the 2900 block of East Madison Street. A few years later in 1962, the organization changed its name to Sokol Baltimore.

In the 1960 United States census, Czech-Americans comprised 57.5% of the foreign-born population in Southeast Baltimore's tract 7–3. The Czech community was then centered in Baltimore's Ward 7. The Fairmount and Chapel Streets Permanent Building, Savings and Loan Association No 1 Inc. changed its name in 1960 to the Fairmount Federal Savings and Loan Association, Inc. In 1963, they moved their headquarters to Baltimore's suburb of Rosedale.

During the 1964 presidential election, leaders of the Maryland Democratic Party directed a campaign against George Wallace in the ethnic neighborhoods of East Baltimore, which included deploying "big name" politicians and dispensing free beer to the locals. Senator Daniel Brewster's election campaign especially targeted the Bohemian, Italian, and Polish areas of Baltimore populated by unionized skilled workers.

By 1969, the Czech-American community in Little Bohemia was predominantly composed of ageing homeowners who lived alongside more recently arrived African-American residents. However, many of the older white Czech-Americans harbored racist attitudes towards black people. According to a reporter with 'The Baltimore Sun', "The older people of Bohemian extraction still live in the houses they own...but they share the neighborhood with black people whom they do not seem to appreciate or understand."

In 1970, the Bohemian Building, Loan and Savings Association changed its name to the Slavie Savings And Loan Association Inc.

In 1986, the Czech and Slovak Heritage Association of Maryland, Inc. was founded in Baltimore. It has since grown into a national organization that offers courses on the languages, culture, and history of the Czechs and Slovaks. In 1987, the association started the Czech and Slovak Heritage Festival. Early festivals were held at War Memorial Plaza and Patterson Park. Later the festival moved to Dundalk and eventually to its current home in Parkville.

The Slavie Savings And Loan Association Inc., changed its name to the Slavie Federal Savings and Loan Association in 1987.

The Czech and Slovak Language School of Maryland was founded in 1988. The school was held at the parish hall of the St. Wenceslaus Church. After a few years the school moved to the Towson Unitarian Universalist Church and then to the Maryland School for the Blind. The school offers the only Czech and Slovak language courses in the Baltimore area.

By 1996, little of the Czech community remained in East Baltimore. The Baltimore Sun described the former community as "now scattered."

As of 1998 the Czechoslovak Society of America, by then called the Czech Society of America, still operated its duckpin bowling league in East Baltimore. As late as 1994, 80-90% of the members of the league were of Czech descent.

The Slavie Federal Savings and Loan Association closed its original location on Collington Avenue near Johns Hopkins Hospital in 1993.

Ze Mean Bean Café in Fell's Point opened in 1995. It is a restaurant which offers Slavic and Eastern European fare, including Czech cuisine. The restaurant was founded by Yvonne Dornic as an ode to her Czechoslovak-born Carpatho-Rusyn father Ivan Dornic.

In 1998, Sokol Baltimore moved to a new location at St. Patrick's Parish Hall on Broadway in Fell's Point.

In January 2011, the Czech and Slovak Association of Baltimore opened the Czech and Slovak Language School for children. Every Friday night during the school year children and their parents meet in the Cathedral Undercroft of the Cathedral of Mary Our Queen. Classes for native Czech speakers and well as Czech classes for non-speakers are offered.

=== 21st century ===
In 2000, the Slavie Federal Savings and Loan Association became the Slavie Federal Savings Bank. The bank's headquarters were moved to the Baltimore suburb of Bel Air in 2001. By 2008, people of Slavic descent still made up ten percent of Slavie's customer base.

In 2007, the Golden Prague Federal Savings and Loan Association was purchased by the Bradford Bank and merged into it.

After the 2011 Virginia earthquake damaged St. Patrick's Church, Sokol Baltimore had to move their organization to a different location. The new Sokol building is on Noble Street in Highlandtown.

The National Slavic Museum opened in 2012. The museum focuses on the Slavic history of Baltimore, including Baltimore's Czech history, and is run entirely by volunteers.

In 2014, after 114 years of business, federal banking regulators closed Slavie Federal Savings Bank after the bank's capital was depleted by bad loans.

As of 2014, there remains a small Czech population in Baltimore, but only a few traces of the community remain. Little Bohemia is no longer a majority Czech neighborhood, as many Czechs have moved to the suburbs primarily due to white flight and the decline of industrial manufacturing jobs. St. Wenceslaus is currently a thriving parish, as the ethnic character of the congregation has undergone a gradual shift from a mostly white working-class Czech parish to one that is multicultural and multiracial, first as many Poles and Lithuanians moved into the neighborhood, and then as the neighborhood shifted to having an African American majority. Little Bohemia was majority white until the 1950s. The neighborhood, now known as Middle East, has suffered from extensive urban decay and housing abandonment due to poverty and crime, as well as the after-effects of the Baltimore riot of 1968, and now has a largely poverty-class and working-class African-American majority. During the 1968 riots, the National Guard ordered residents to stay indoors. Residents throughout Little Bohemia could smell the smoke caused by arson during the riots. As African-Americans began to migrate into the area during the 1960s and 1970s and the neighborhood began to shift from Black to white, Black newcomers and ageing white immigrants briefly lived side by side. The African-American newcomers referred to white immigrants in the neighborhood as "Germans", regardless of where they came from. White people tended to go to St. Wenceslaus, while Black people tended to be to Israel Baptist Church.

The neighborhood was one of the hardest hit in Baltimore, as the white working-class and middle-class African-American tax base left and the area was effected by epidemics of heroin, crack cocaine, and HIV, along with an intensification of gang activity fueled by the drug trade. The predatory practices of lenders, landlords, and property flippers have also contributed to the spiraling cycle of decline and disinvestment. By 2000, Middle East was the second poorest neighborhood in Baltimore, with a median household income of $14,900, less than half the city's median. Less than half of all adults were employed in the labor force and over a third of households had poverty-level incomes. Crime and domestic violence rates were double those of the city as a whole, and the incidence of lead poisoning and child abuse were among the highest in Baltimore.

The Madison Bohemian Savings Bank is still in business, but is now headquartered in Baltimore's suburb of Forest Hill. The bank no longer limits its loans to Czechs.

While the Czech-American community in Baltimore has been historically white, since the 1990s a small cohort of Black Czechs settled in Baltimore. These African-Czechs are Ethiopian immigrants who settled in the Czechoslovak Socialist Republic before resettling in the United States. The Ethiopian-Czechs settled in Czechoslovakia due to international ties to the Soviet Union while Ethiopia was under Communist rule. These Afro-Czechs have experienced racism from white Czechs, both in Czechoslovakia and the United States. The Ethiopian-Czechs who settled in Baltimore were mostly male, with many marrying Czech or Slovak women and raising American children. Many are regulars at the Czech and Slovak Festival, among the few people of color at the majority white festival.

The historically Czech area surrounding Johns Hopkins Hospital, now majority African-American, is facing encroachment from the growing Johns Hopkins campus. Many Black residents believed that Johns Hopkins practiced institutional racism against African-Americans and nicknamed the hospital "The Plantation". The homes of 1,200 African-Americans were demolished to make way for the construction of dormitories for white medical staff and a fence was erected to protect staff from "vandals". Local African-Americans nicknamed the dormitories "The Compound". During the Baltimore riot of 1968, Johns Hopkins was spared but Monument Street and Gay Street were torched. The issue of the expansion of Johns Hopkins Hospital and the gentrification of the surrounding neighborhood has been the source of several decades of socioeconomic and racial conflict, often pitting Johns Hopkins Hospital against the poor Black residents of the surrounding neighborhoods.

== Culture ==
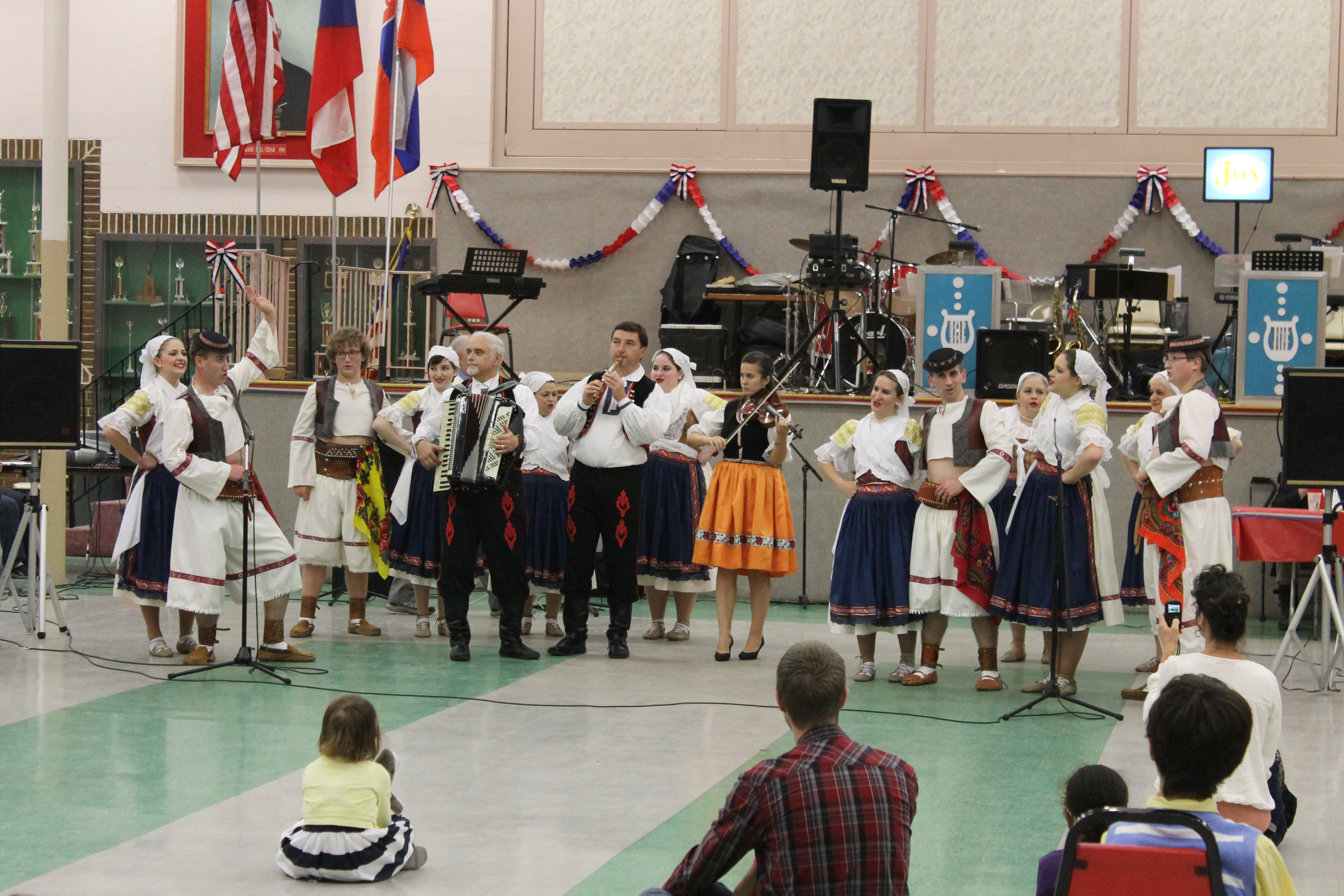
Czech and Slovak Heritage Festival, Parkville, Maryland, October 2014.

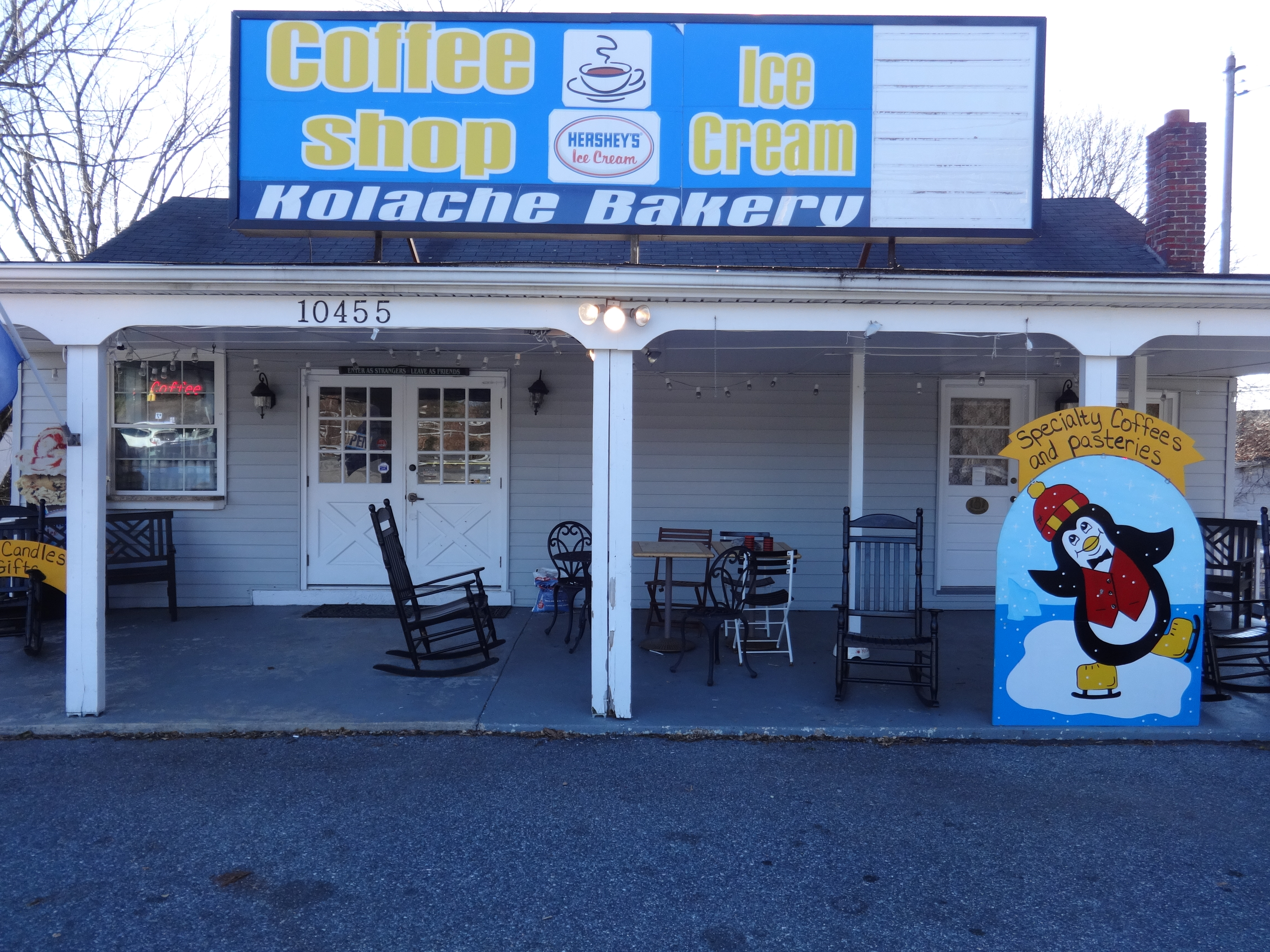
Kolache Kreations, Ellicott City, Maryland, December 2014.

The first Czech restaurant in Baltimore was located at Canton and Register Streets. The Czech Singing and Dramatic Society was first organized at this restaurant. The first Czech brewery was founded in 1856 at Asquith and Jefferson Streets. The brewery hosted drinking, dining, and dancing.

The annual Czech and Slovak Heritage Festival still exists and is held in Baltimore's suburb of Parkville.

In Ellicott City, located not far from Baltimore, there was a Czech-style pastry shop named Kolache Kreations that offered Czech cuisine, such as kolache. It was the only kolache shop in Maryland. The shop was founded by Ileana Fernandez, a Hispanic woman from Texas who was surprised that no kolache shops existed in Maryland. Texas is home to hundreds of kolache shops, due to the rich history of Czech immigration to Texas.

As of 2014 there were only 1,000 screen paintings left.

The American Visionary Art Museum features a permanent exhibition on screen paintings, including a re-creation of a row house and a documentary titled "The Screen Painters" made by Elaine Eff, a folklorist who serves as the president of the Painted Screen Society of Baltimore. Eff is the author of "The Painted Screens of Baltimore: An Urban Folk Art Revealed", having researched the tradition of screen painting since 1974.

Historically, there was a strong connection between the Czech and Slovak communities in Baltimore and the Czech and Slovak communities in Prince George County, Virginia. The members of the two communities would often travel back and forth between Baltimore and Prince George County in order to cooperate on events.

In 2016, the Baltimore Slavic Heritage Festival was founded by Yvonne Dornic. The festival is held at St. Mary's Assumption Eastern Rite Catholic Church in the Baltimore suburb of Joppa and is the first Pan-Slavic festival in the Baltimore area, bringing together 13 Slavic heritages - Czech, Slovak, Ukrainian, Polish, Russian, Bulgarian, Serbian, Croatian, Bosnian, Slovenian, Montenegrin, Belarusian, Macedonian and Lemko. The Bulgarian Embassy has sent dancers to the festival and a variety of Slavic foods are served, including pierogi, borscht, and holupki.

The Lemko House, an apartment complex on South Ann Street, provides housing for Eastern European immigrants. Founded in 1983 by Ivan Dornic, an Eastern Rite priest, the complex is named after Dornic's ethnic group, the Lemkos. The Lemkos are a Rusyn ethnic group inhabiting Lemkivshchyna, a part of Transcarpathia that spans parts of Slovakia, Poland, and Ukraine. Lemko House has opened its doors to low-income residents of any ethnicity, but is still home to many Slavic and Eastern European immigrants.

The Pride Center of Maryland offers Czech-language services to gay, lesbian, bisexual, and transgender clients in the Greater Baltimore region.

A few reminders of the city's Czech heritage exist in local place names, most notably Moravia Road, the Moravia-Walther neighborhood, Frank C Bocek Park, and Prague Avenue near Rosedale.

== Religion ==
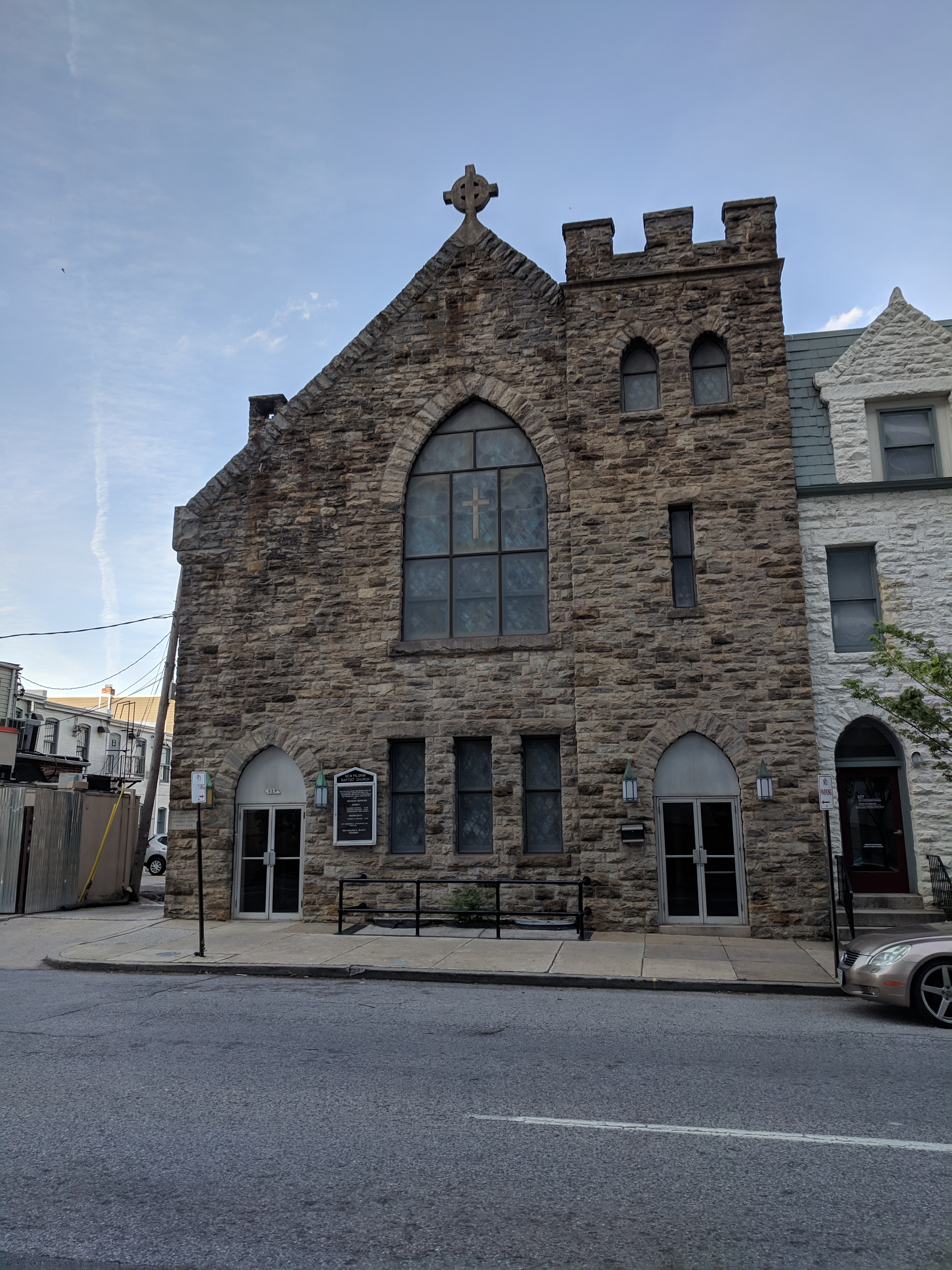
New Pilgrim Baptist Church on North Washington Street, the former location of Mount Tabor Bohemian Methodist Episcopal Church, May 2019.

Czech-Americans in Baltimore have largely been either Roman Catholics or freethinkers, while small but significant minorities have been Protestant or Jewish. The most prominent Roman Catholic organization has been St. Wenceslaus and the most prominent freethought organization has been the Grand Lodge Č.S.P.S. of Baltimore. The Czech-Slovak Protective Society was founded by secular Czech-Americans and promoted freethought and liberal values.

=== Protestantism ===
In addition to St. Wenceslaus church, there have been two other churches in Baltimore that have specifically catered to Baltimore's Czech Christian community. Both of these churches, the Mount Tabor Bohemian Methodist Episcopal Church and the Bohemian and Moravian Presbyterian Church, were established for the Protestant minority. Mount Tabor, a Methodist Episcopal church, was located at 629 North Washington Street and is now home to a black Baptist church called New Pilgrim Baptist Church. Beginning in the 1880s, Mount Tabor's services were held at the former Appold Methodist Episcopal Church at 2001 East Chase Street near Washington Street, before moving to their location at 629 North Washington. The Czech Presbyterians first organized a congregation in 1890, first holding services at Faith Chapel on Broadway just north of Shimek's Bohemian Hall. By 1898, the Presbyterians had raised enough funds to build their own church, the Bohemian and Moravian Presbyterian Church, on Ashland at the intersection with Washington Street. In 1947, the Bohemian and Moravian Church was sold to a black congregation, becoming the Freedom Temple AME Zion Church. In 2016, Johns Hopkins Hospital purchased the building and subsequently demolished it to make way for a medical-related facility.

=== Judaism ===
Chevrei Tzedek Congregation, a Conservative synagogue in Baltimore, is home to one of the 1,564 Torah scrolls rescued by the Jewish community of Prague during World War II. The scroll was written by a sofer from the "Prague School of Kabbalists." The members of the Prague School of Kabbalists were all murdered by the Nazis during the Shoah, so knowledge of this tradition has not been passed down. The scroll has suffered serious water damage to the Book of Exodus while in storage under the Communist government of Czechoslovakia, but is in excellent condition from Leviticus to Deuteronomy. The scroll has not been fully repaired yet and costs for restoration are estimated at $15,000.

== Notable Czech-Americans from Baltimore ==
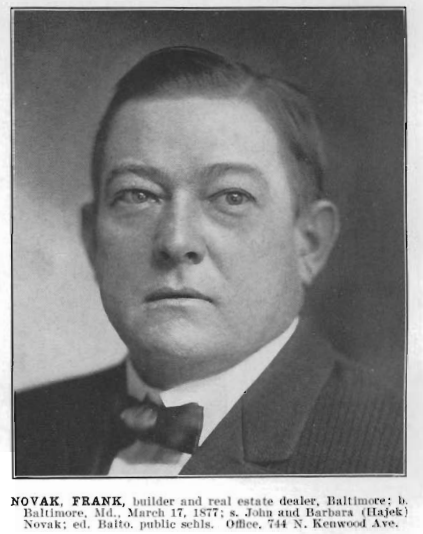
Frank Novak, builder and architect who developed Baltimore's iconic style of rowhouses with marble steps.

- Virginia S. Baker, a civil servant and employee of the Department of Recreation and Parks in Baltimore City.
- Martin Greenfield, a Czechoslovak-born master tailor specializing in men's suits and a Holocaust survivor.
- William R. Jecelin, a soldier in the United States Army who posthumously received the Medal of Honor for his actions during the Korean War.
- Frederick Jelinek, a Czechoslovak-born researcher in information theory, automatic speech recognition, and natural language processing.
- August Klecka, a Democratic politician and newspaper editor.
- Nancy Mowll Mathews, an art historian, curator, and author.
- James F. Matousek, an American attorney and civil servant who served the City of Baltimore in various legal and administrative capacities for more than four decades.
- John Neumann, a German Bohemian immigrant who became a Catholic priest of the Redemptorist order.
- Ric Ocasek, a musician and music producer best known as lead vocalist for the rock band The Cars.
- William Oktavec, a Bohemian immigrant who invented screen painting.
- Michael Peroutka, a Maryland lawyer who founded the institute on the Constitution.
- Maelcum Soul, bohemian, artist, and actress in two of filmmaker John Waters' earliest works.
- Dutch Ulrich, professional baseball player for the Philadelphia Phillies.
- Charles Yukl, a ragtime pianist and murderer.
- Christina "Brave" Williams, a vocalist for the R&B girl group "RichGirl".
- Isaac Mayer Wise, an Egerland-born Reform rabbi, editor, and author.

=== Czech expatriates in Baltimore ===
- Stanislav Grof, a psychiatrist who helped found the field of transpersonal psychology and a researcher into the use of non-ordinary states of consciousness.

== See also ==
- Ethnic groups in Baltimore
- History of Baltimore
- White ethnic
- White flight
- Historie české komunity v Baltimoru, Czech Wikipedia version of this article.

== Gallery ==
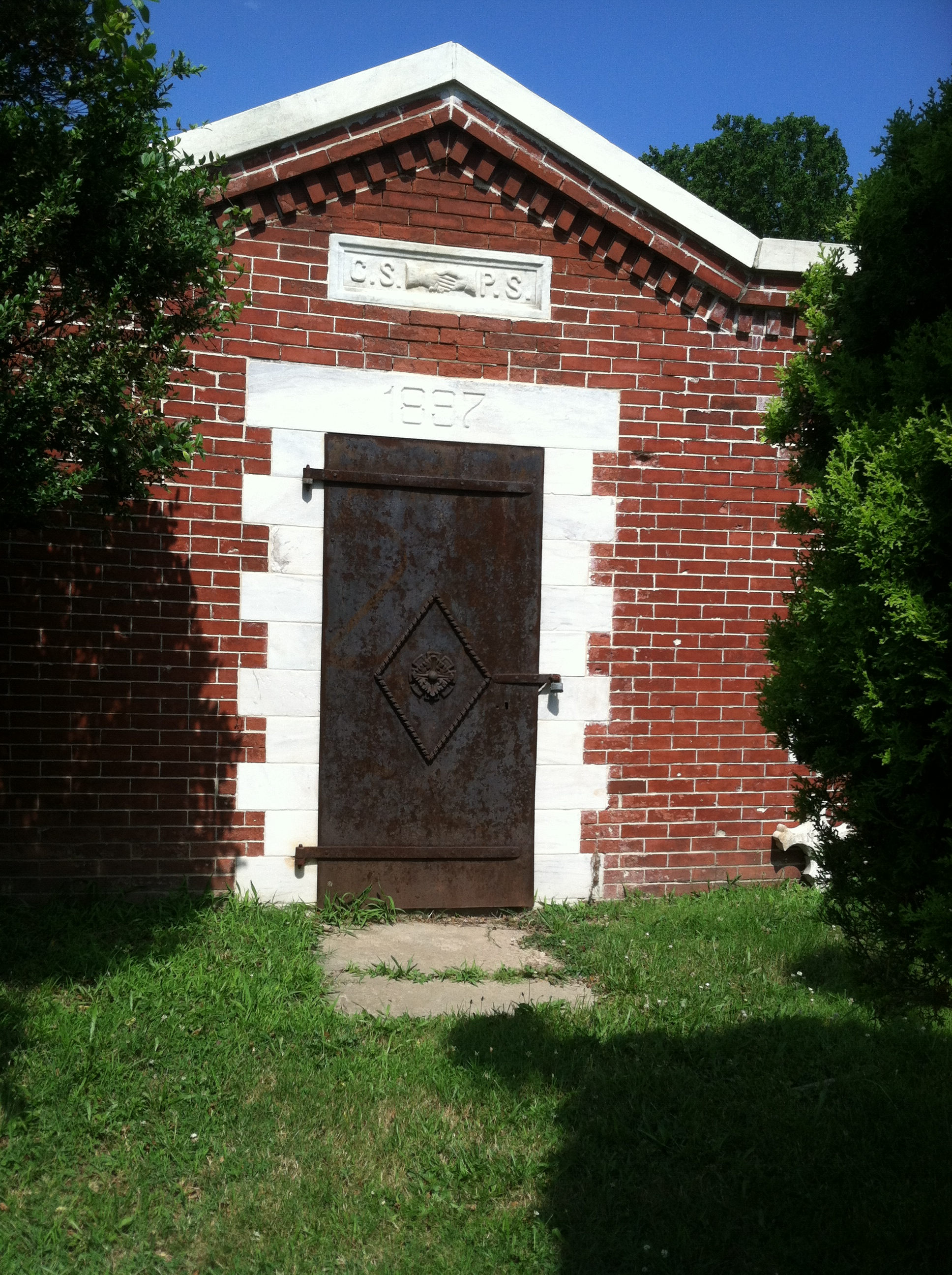
A C.S.P.S. crypt at Bohemian National Cemetery

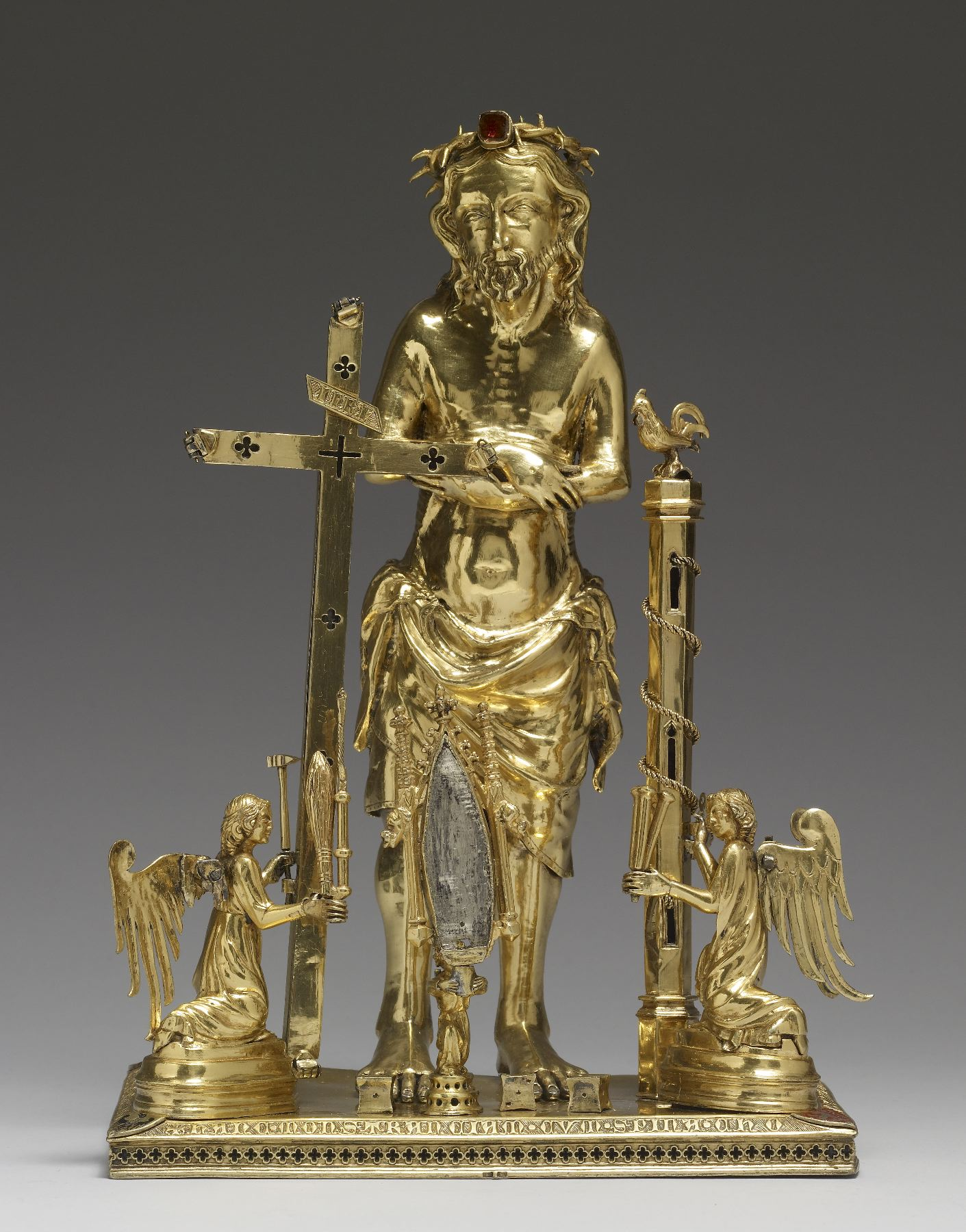
Bohemian Reliquary with the Man of Sorrows in the Walters Art Museum.

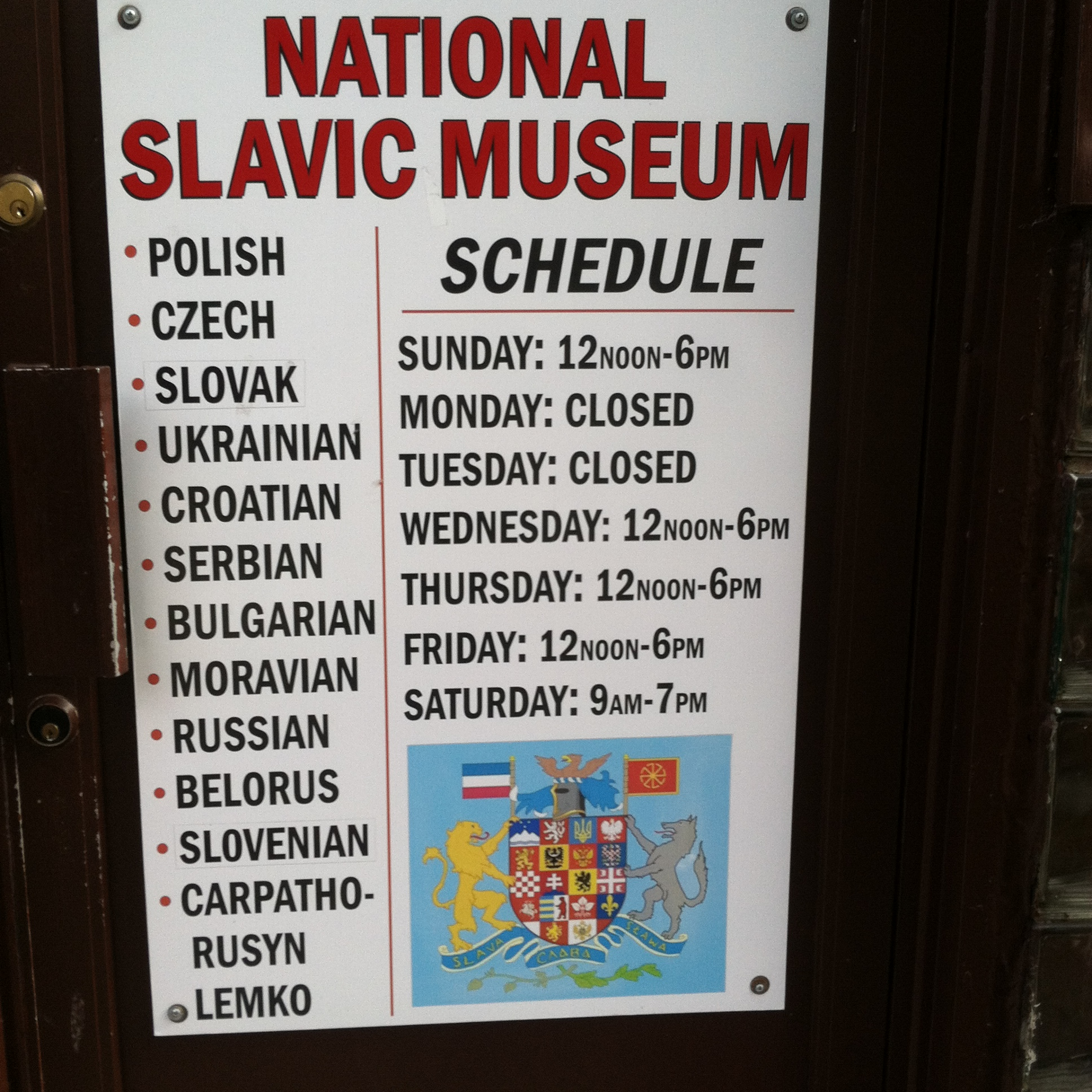
Door sign for the National Slavic Museum

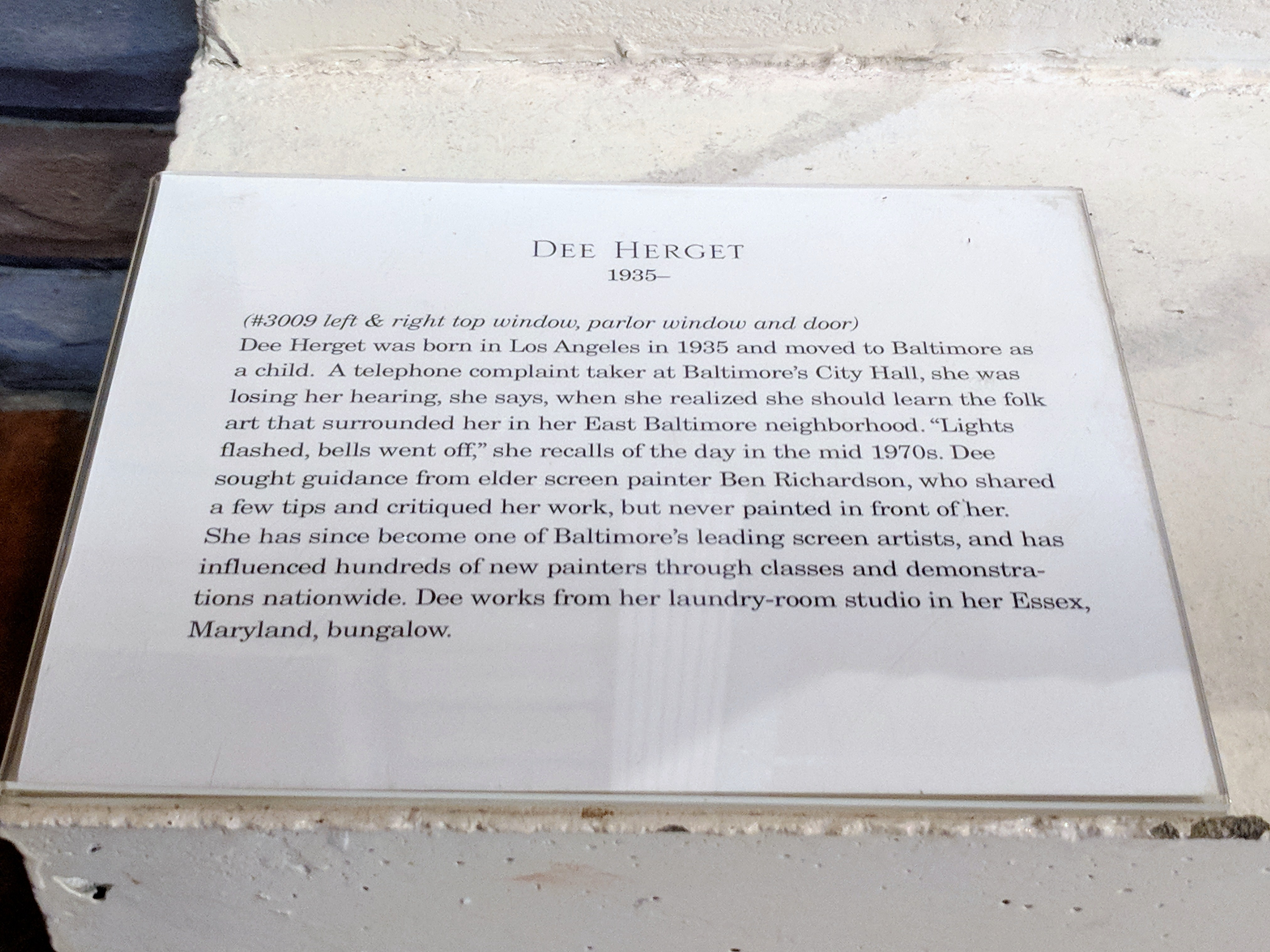
Plaque at the Baltimore Painted Screens & Rowhouse Theater at the American Visionary Art Museum

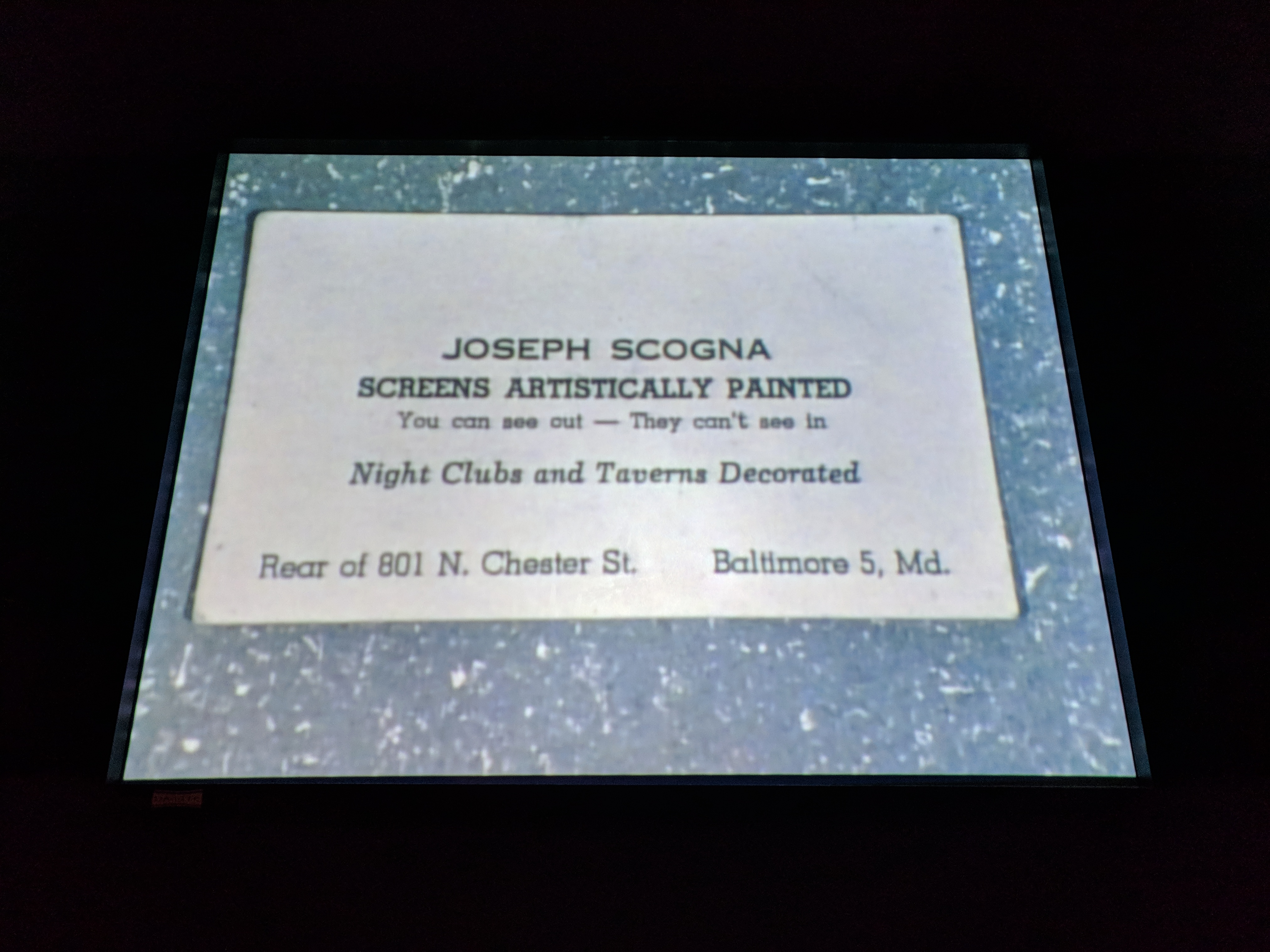
Business card for a screen painter from the Elaine Eff documentary at the American Visionary Art Museum

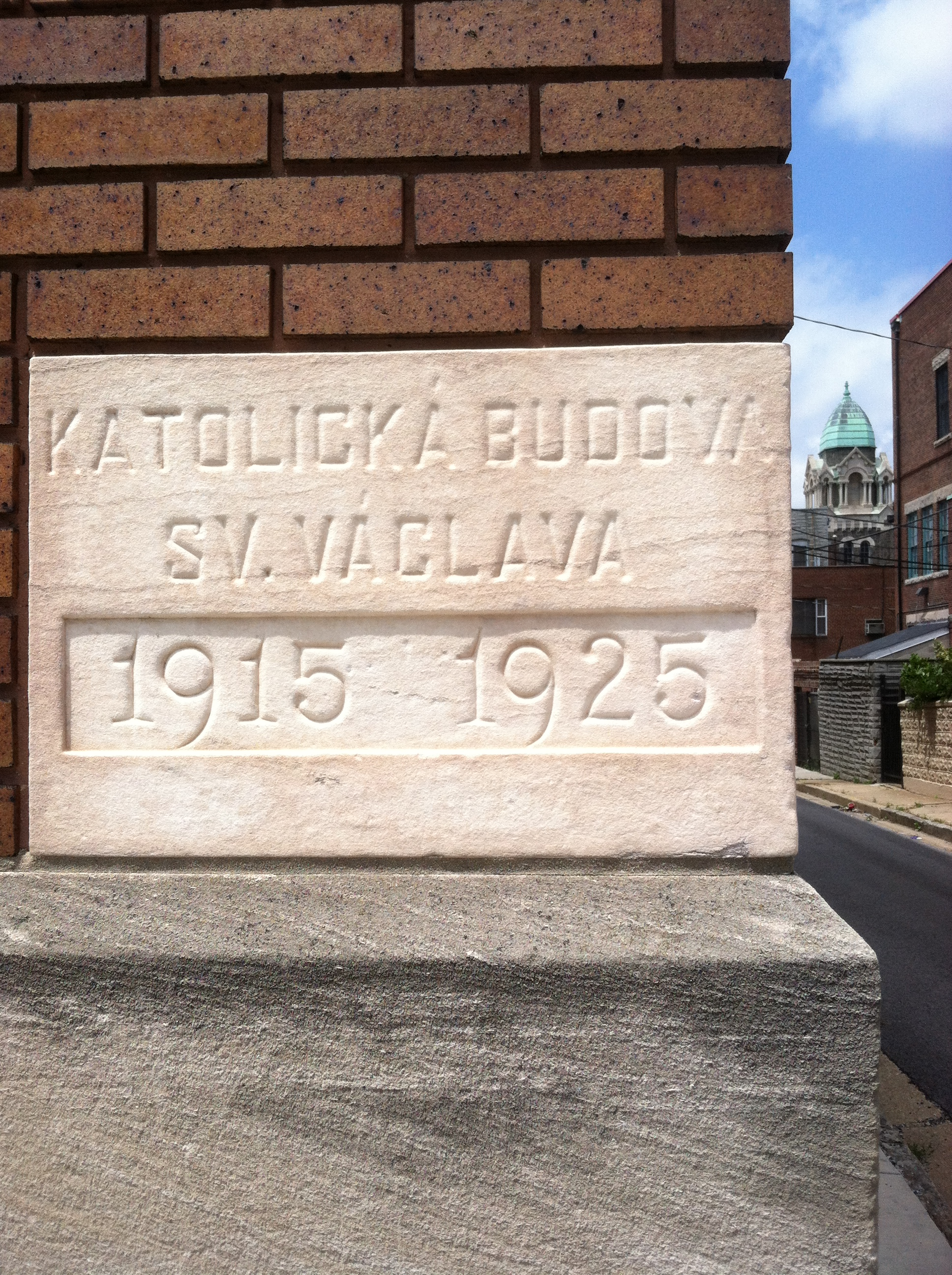
Czech cornerstone at the St. Wenceslaus Lyceum that reads "Katolická Budova Sv. Václava" (The Catholic Building of St. Wenceslaus).

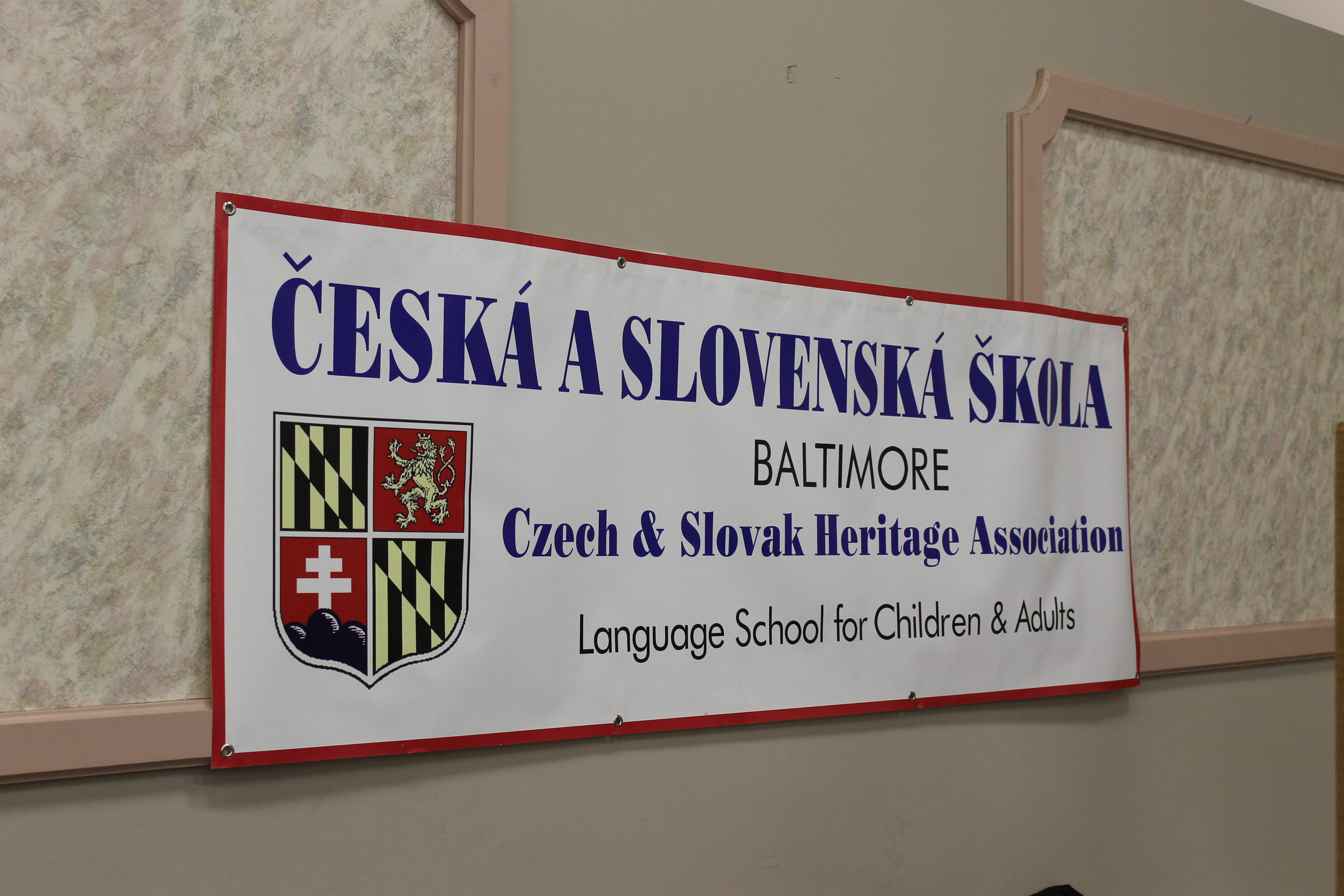
Czech and English sign at the Czech and Slovak Festival.

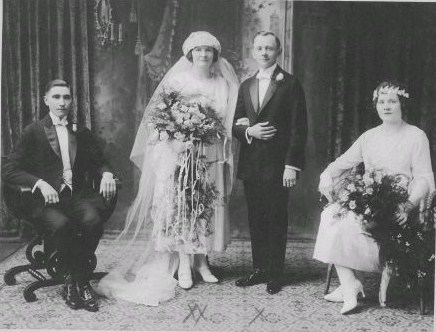
A wedding of a Bohemian couple from Baltimore.

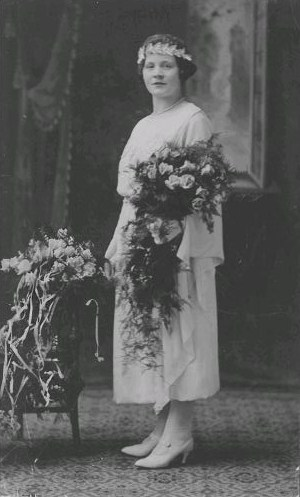
A Bohemian woman from Baltimore at her sister's wedding.

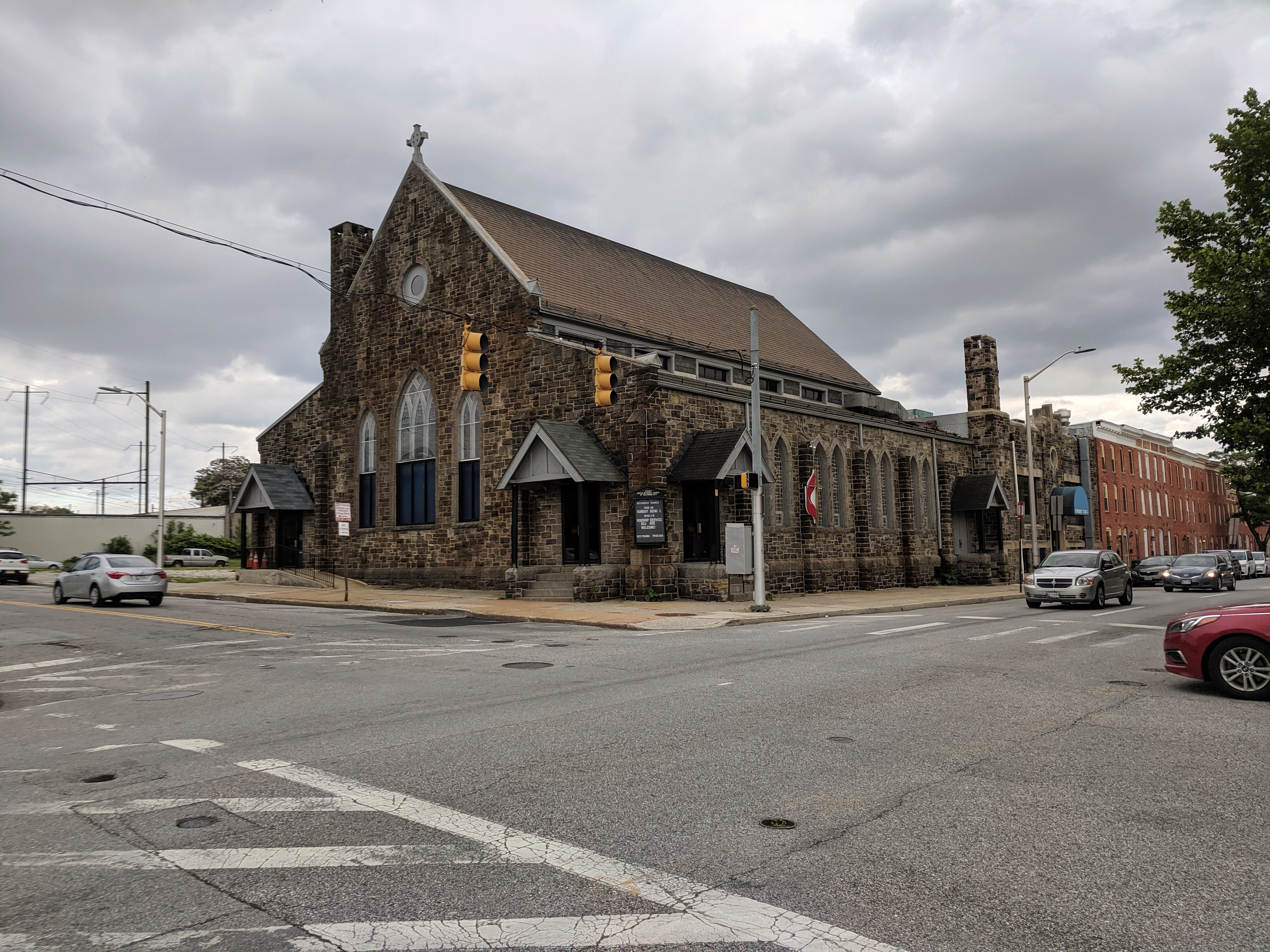
Christ United Methodist Church on Chase Street, the former site of Appold Methodist Episcopal Church where the Mount Tabor Bohemian Methodist congregation originally held services.

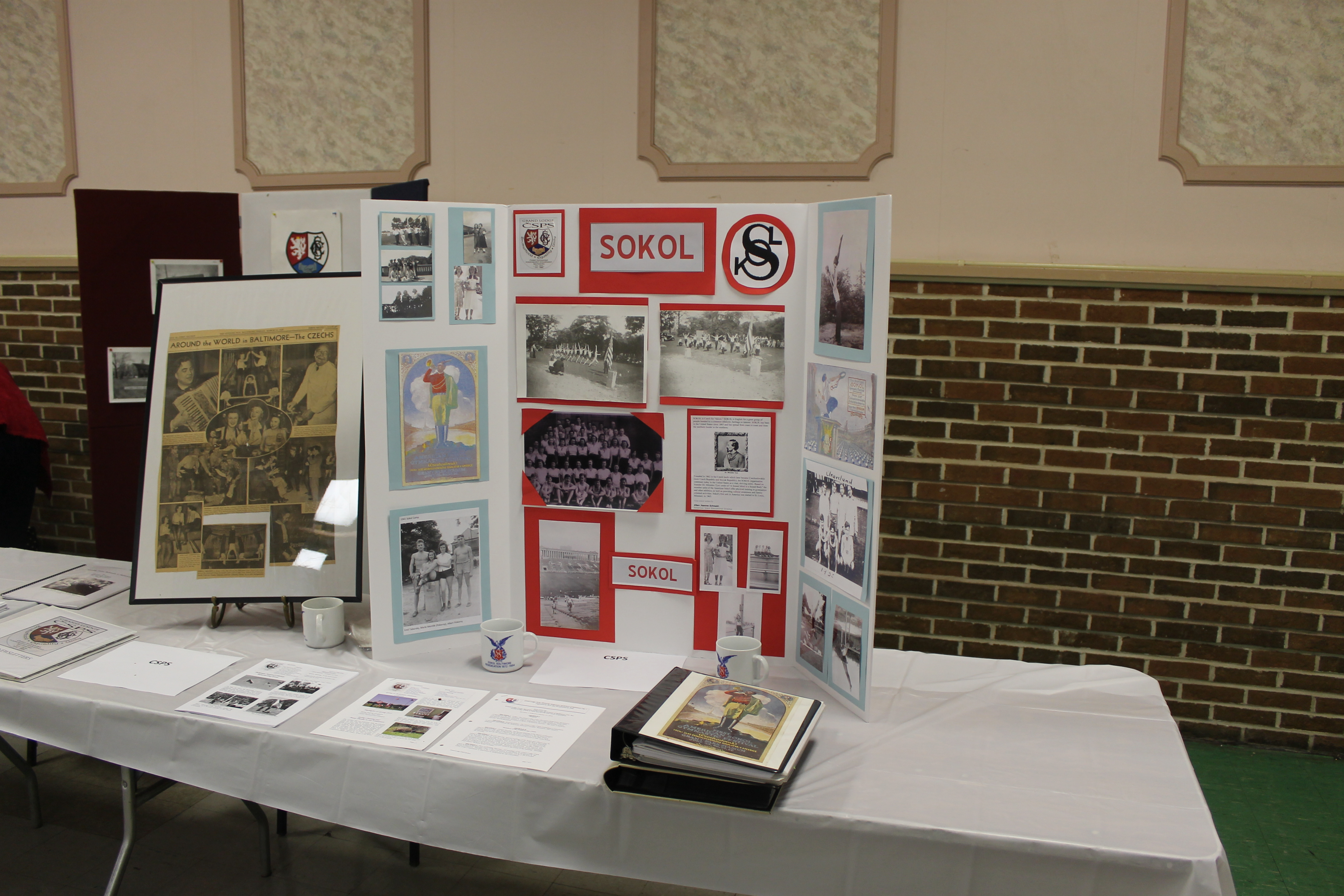
Sokol Baltimore booth at the twenty-eighth annual Czech and Slovak Heritage Festival.

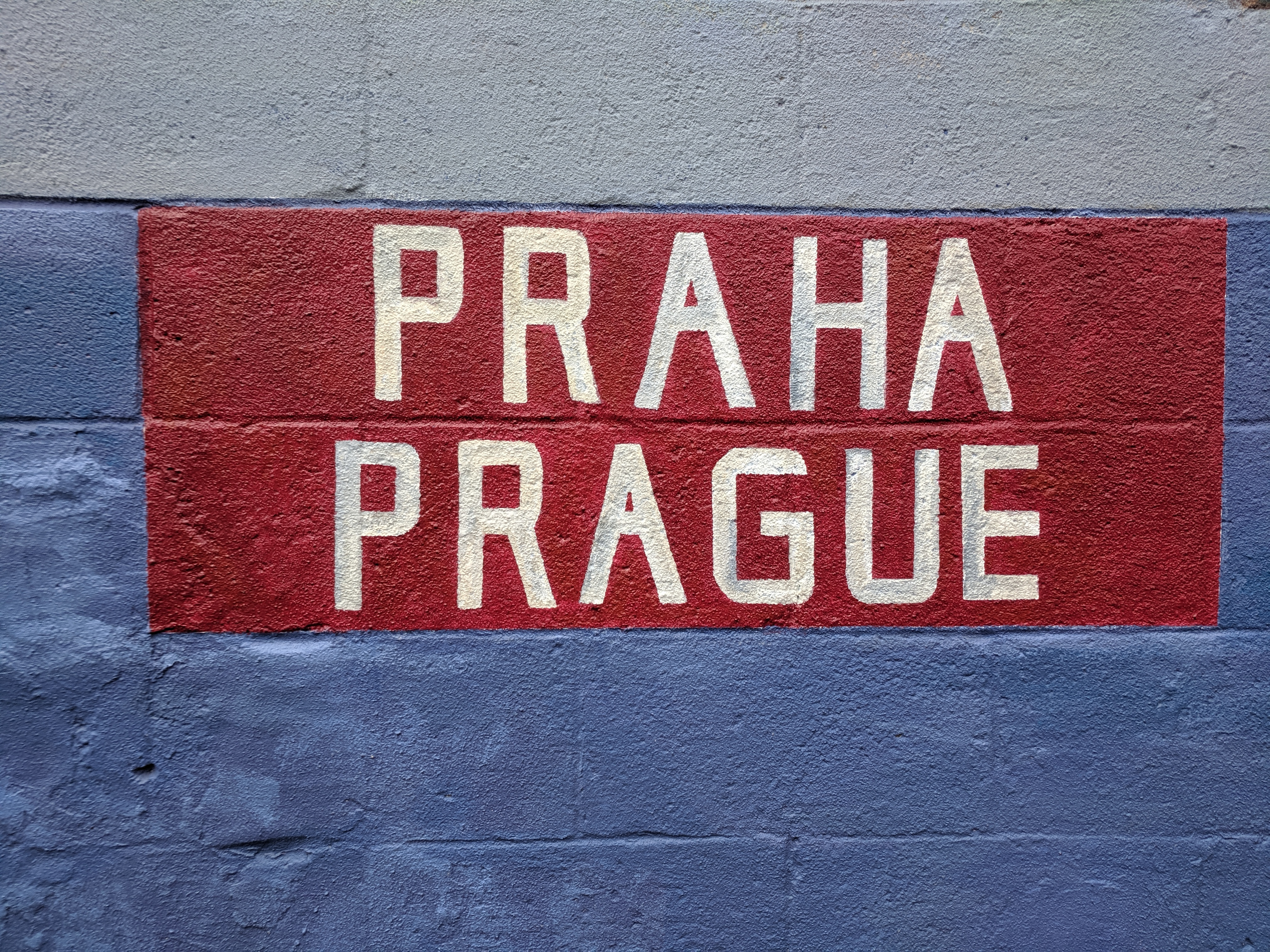
Praha/Prague bilingual inscription on a mural at Sokol Baltimore.

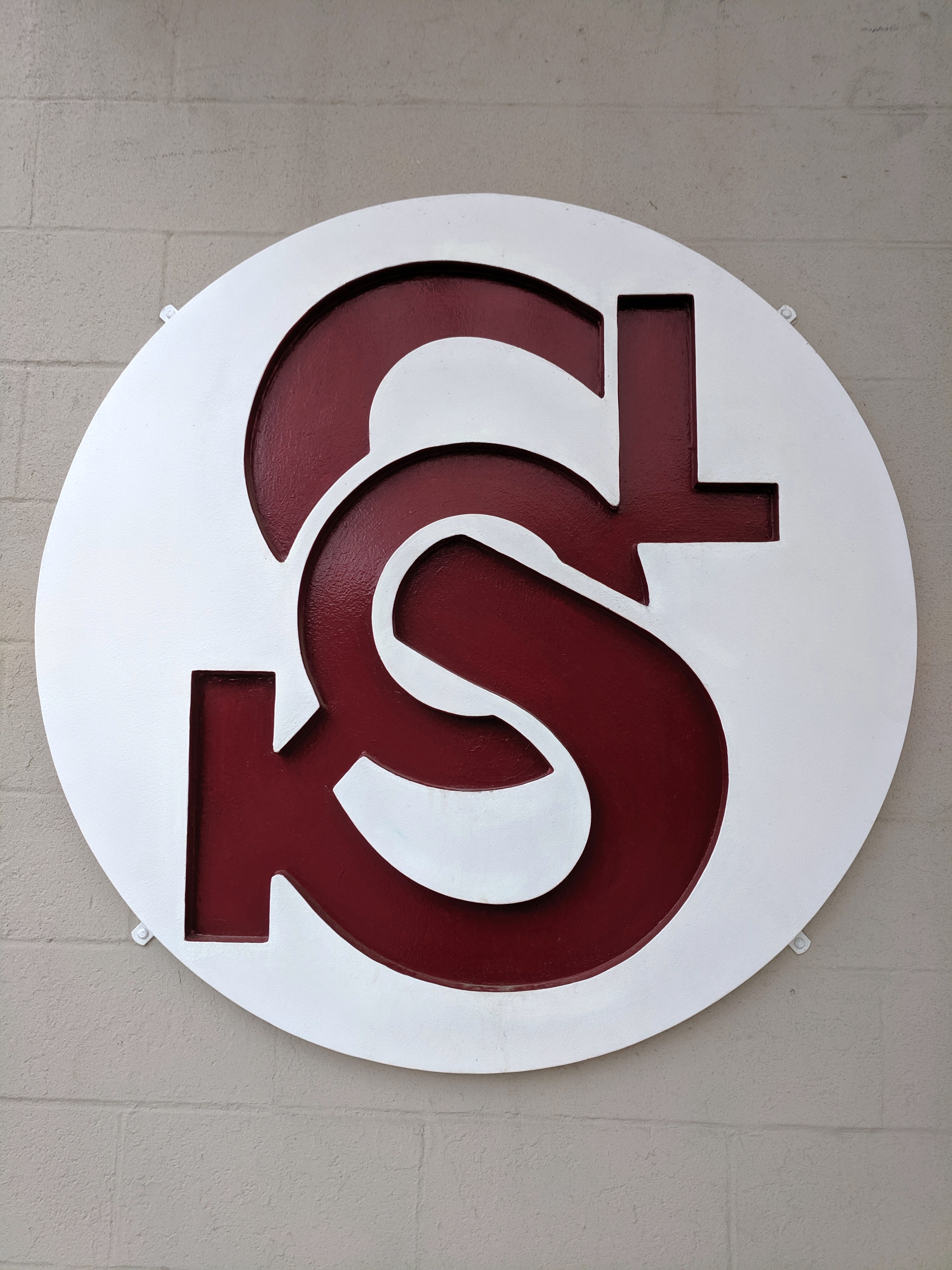
Sokol symbol at the entrance to Sokol Baltimore.

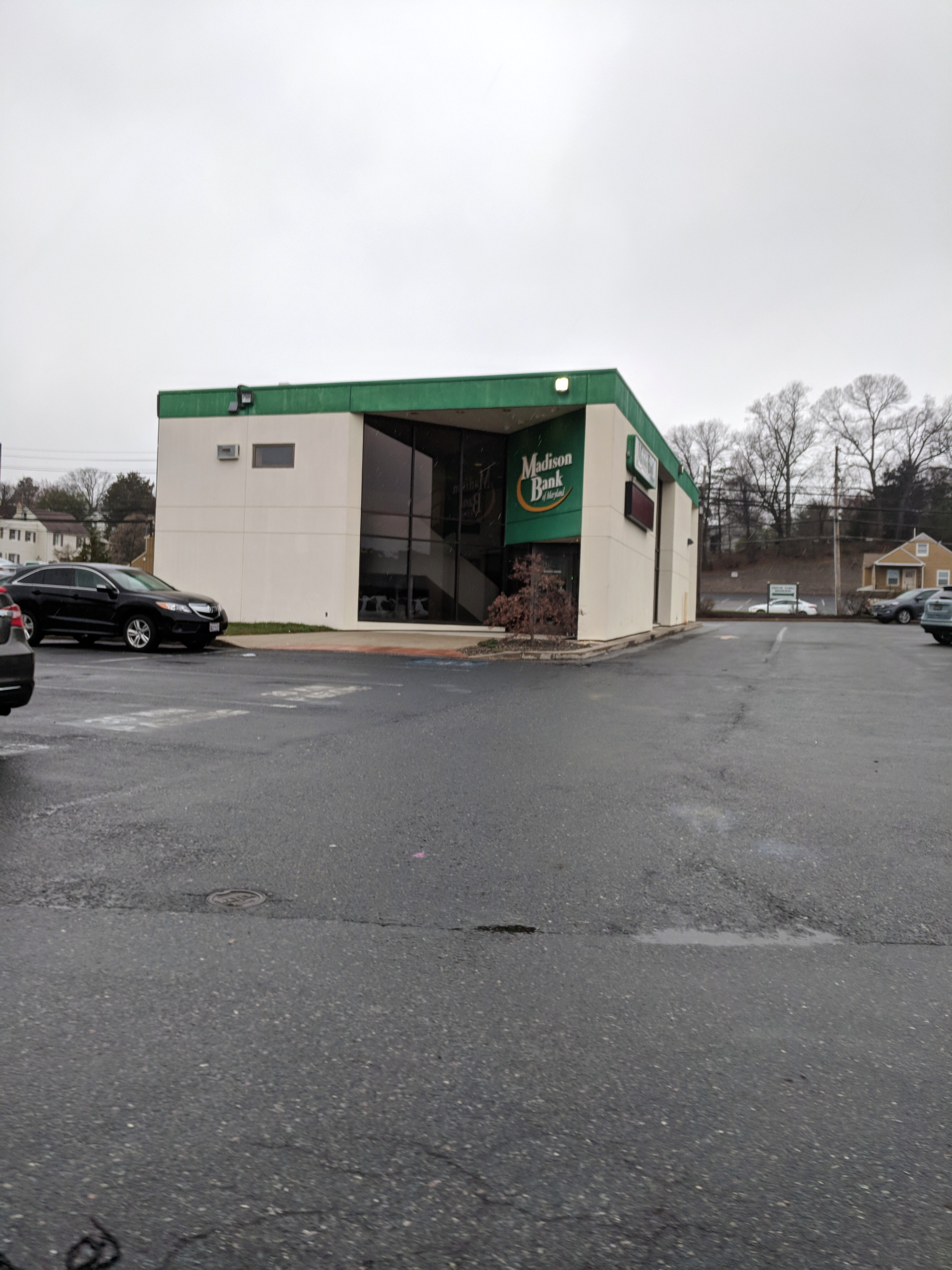
Madison Bank of Maryland in Forest Hill, formerly the Madison Bohemian Savings Bank.

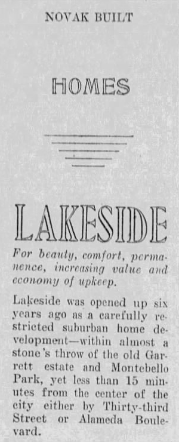
A September 26, 1926 advertisement in the Baltimore Sun for a racially restricted "Novak Built" development in Lakeside, Baltimore.

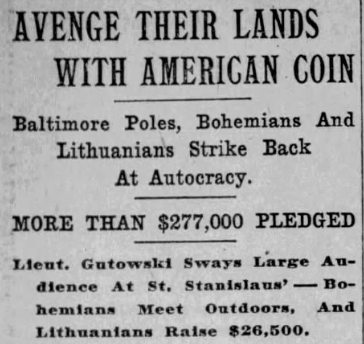
An April 22, 1918, article in the Baltimore Sun about Bohemians, Lithuanians, and Polish people in Baltimore engaging in fundraising for liberty bonds.

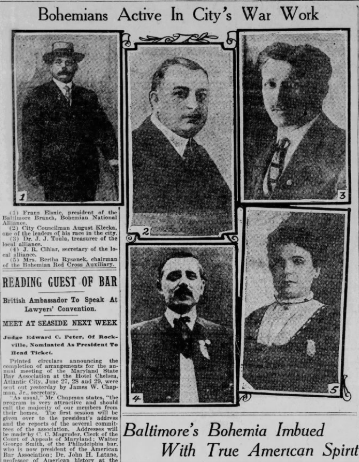
"Bohemians Active in City's War Work" article in the Baltimore Sun, June 18, 1918, about Bohemian war work activism during World War I.

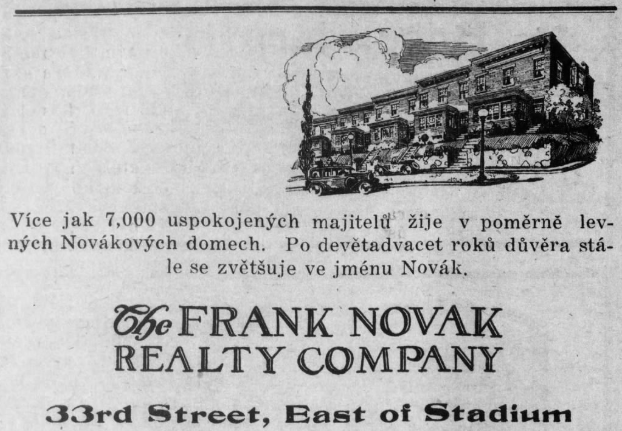
Frank Novak Realty Company advertisement in the Telegraf, December 28, 1928.
