= Milton-Montford, Baltimore =

- Neighborhood of Baltimore
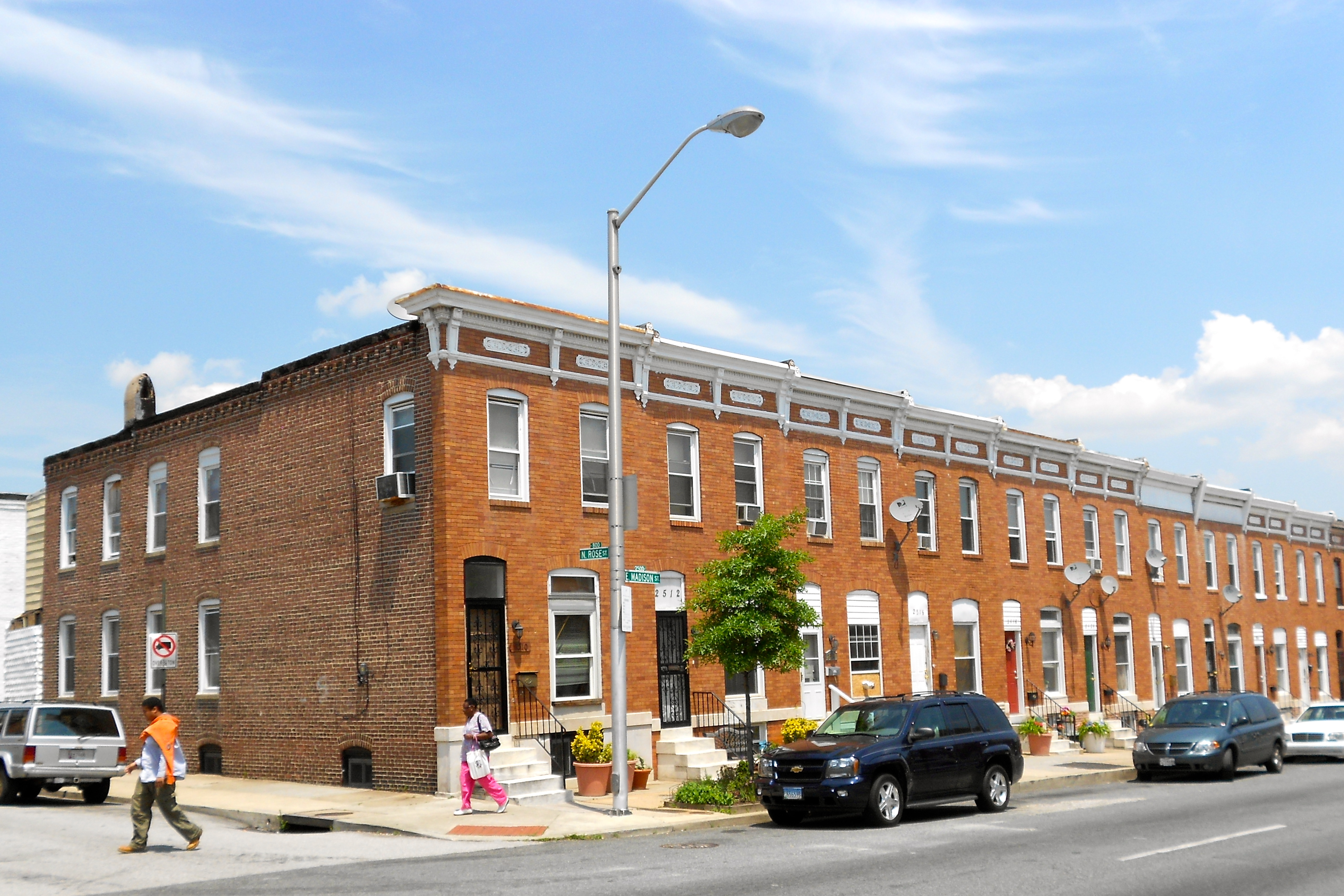

- Location within Baltimore
- Coordinates: 39°18′1.116″N 76°35′2.4576″W
- Country: United States
- State: Maryland
- City: Baltimore
- ZIP Code: 21205
- Area codes: 410, 443, and 667

Milton-Montford is a neighborhood in the heart of East Baltimore, Maryland. Milton-Montford lies north of Patterson Park and south of Amtrak's Northeast Corridor. The neighborhood is bounded by the neighborhoods of McElderry Park to the south, Madison-Eastend to the east, Biddle Street to the north, and Middle East to the west. The swath of land between Johns Hopkins Hospital and Frank C Bocek Park, which includes Milton-Montford, is often referred to as the "Down the Hill" neighborhood by local residents.

== History ==
The neighborhood lies within the East Monument Historic District. The district is historically significant due to the large Czech-American immigrant community that once lived in the area. Working-class Central and Eastern European immigrants living in the neighborhood often worked at nearby factories. Milton-Montford has since transitioned to a majority African-American neighborhood.

Milton-Montford is a neighborhood in transition due to gentrification driven by Johns Hopkins Hospital. Sales of houses have increased since 2016 and prices have soared. Cost of real estate in Milton-Montford neighborhood has increased partly because of the nearby Station East redevelopment.

In 2023, the Milton-Montford Community Association joined a lawsuit against Baltimore Gas and Electric (BGE), alleging that BGE had forced them to change homes and pay for damages that occurred during construction work. The lawsuit alleged that BGE had forced the neighborhood to install gas regulators without proper community input and approval.
