= Down the hill =

Down the hill is used as a colloquial name for multiple specific geographic locations. These include:

- The Cajon Pass, as referred to by the High Desert, California area between Los Angeles, California and Las Vegas, Nevada in the United States
- The residential neighborhoods in East Baltimore, Maryland, USA, between Johns Hopkins Hospital and Frank C. Bocek Park, including:
  - Milton-Montford, Baltimore
  - Madison-Eastend, Baltimore
