= William Oktavec =

Czech-born American artist who invented screen painting

- Born: Wenceslaus Anton Oktavec Sr. October 25, 1884; Kasejovice, Bohemia, Austria-Hungary
- Died: June 2, 1956 (aged 71)
- Spouse: Theresa Maria Soler
- Children: Albert John, Bernard Martin, William Anthony, and Richard Steven

William Oktavec (born Wenceslaus Anton Oktavec Sr.; October 25, 1884 – June 2, 1956) was a Czech-born American artist, draftsman, butcher and grocer, best known for inventing screen painting.

== Personal life ==
Oktavec was born in Kasejovice in Bohemia, Austria-Hungary on October 25, 1884. He was the fifth of eight siblings. His father owned a small farm in Kasejovice. Emigrating from Bremen, Germany, to New York City in 1901, Oktavec resided in Baltimore by 1912. Oktavec visited Kasejovice in 1938, which was the last time he ever saw his European family members.

== Career ==
While living in East Baltimore's Little Bohemia, Oktavec owned a grocery store. Originally a house, Oktavec refashioned it into a grocery. The store was located at 847 North Collington Avenue at the intersection with Ashland Avenue, adjacent to the Bohemian parish of St. Wenceslaus Catholic Church. Oktavec's grocery store only lasted for 2 years. While trained as a butcher, he was also an artist. During the summer of 1913, Oktavec noticed that his produce was wilting due to the heat of the Sun. Moving the fruit and vegetables inside his store, he painted the screens on his store to look like they were display cases showing fresh produce and meats. The novelty of the painted screens attracted the attention of customers. Another benefit of painted screens was that they allowed people to look outside without allowing people to look inside. Oktavec's neighbor Emma Schott requested a screen painting for her own home, using a photograph that reminded her of her rural upbringing in Bohemia. Screen painting quickly became popular with Baltimore's working-class Czech immigrant community, and soon became common across the city. A common motif was a red-roofed bungalow with two swans in a pond.

In 1922, Oktavec opened the Art Store on East Monument Street to pursue his career as an artist. Oktavec's children, grandchildren, and many students helped popularize the art form.

Some of Oktavec's painted screens are owned by the Maryland Historical Society.

== Death and legacy ==
William Oktavec died on June 2, 1956. he is buried at Most Holy Redeemer Cemetery in East Baltimore. His son, Albert Oktavec, also pursued a career as an artist and screen painter.

In 2013, a plaque was installed outside the house at 847 North Collington Avenue to honor Oktavec. It was installed for the centennial of the invention of screen-painting by the Painted Screens Society of Baltimore and Skyline Property Management Titled "Screen Painting started here in 1913". The writing on the plaque reads:

Baltimore's first painted screen was created and displayed here. William Oktavec, a Bohemian immigrant, owned this corner store from 1913 to 1915. He was trained as a butcher but was an artist at heart.

After displaying his produce outside in summer heat, he brought his perishables inside. He painted a picture on the screen doors of "cuts of beef, spare ribs, lettuce, cucumbers and carrots." His neighbor realize she could see out from inside the store, but could not see in from the sidewalk. He had created the perfect solution to the busy street outside, keeping cool breezes flowing and insects out. She handed him a calendar image of a red-roofed mill that he copied onto her living room screen. Soon, rowhouse owners all over East Baltimore demanded painted screens. The cozy cottage in a pastoral setting was most popular.

Oktavec opened The Art Shop on East Monument Street in 1922. His sons, grandson, students including the "Half-man" Johnny Eck and hundreds of kindred spirits -- dabblers, sign painters, jacks-of-all-trades -- painted screens for friends, family and customers. "They used to be everywhere," numbering over 150,000 at their peak in the 1950s. Air conditioners and changing tastes have kept many windows closed year round, but the need for privacy and beauty continues.
