= Johnny Eck =

American freak show performer and actor

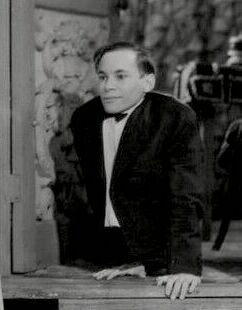
- Eck in Freaks (1932)
- Born: John Eckhardt Jr. August 27, 1911; Baltimore, Maryland, U.S.
- Died: January 5, 1991 (aged 79); Baltimore, Maryland, U.S.
- Resting place: Green Mount Cemetery
- Occupations: Actor, sideshow performer
- Years active: 1923–?

John Eckhardt Jr (August 27, 1911 – January 5, 1991), professionally billed as Johnny Eck, was an American freak show performer in sideshows and a film actor. Born with sacral agenesis, Eck is best known today for his role in Tod Browning's 1932 cult classic film Freaks and his appearances as a bird creature in several Tarzan films. He was often billed as "The Amazing Half-Boy", "King of the Freaks" and "The Most Remarkable Man Alive".

Besides being a sideshow art performer and actor, Eck was also a folk artist (specifically a screen painter), musician, photographer, illusionist, penny arcade owner, Punch and Judy operator, and expert model-maker.

== Early life ==
John Eckhardt Jr. was born on August 27, 1911, to Emelia (born 1876) and John Eckhardt Sr. (born 1874) in Baltimore, Maryland, as a fraternal twin.

His brother Robert Eckhardt was also a performer. He also had an older sister named Caroline Laura Eckhardt. Although Eck capitalized on the resemblance between himself and Robert, the twins were fraternal.

Eck was walking on his hands before his brother was standing when he was a year old. Both of the Eckhardt twins could read by the age of four. His sister Caroline educated Eck at home until he and his brother enrolled in public school at age seven. He recalled that larger students would "fight each other for the 'honor' or 'privilege' of lifting [him] up the stone steps" to school, and that school windows were blacked out to discourage throngs of curious onlookers from peering in at Eck during his studies.

Emilia Eckhardt intended that Eck go into the ministry, and the young Eck was often called upon to perform impromptu sermons for guests. "I would climb atop of a small box and preach against drinking beer and damning sin and the devil," Eck recalled in an autobiographical fragment. These sermons quickly came to an end when Eck began passing around a saucer for donations.

== Health condition ==
Eckhardt was born with sacral agenesis, a congenital condition in which the lower part of the spine does not develop completely. As a result, he had a shortened torso and underdeveloped legs and feet that were not functional. Throughout his career, he concealed his legs beneath specially tailored clothing.

At birth, Eckhardt weighed two pounds (0.91 kg) and measured less than eight inches (20 cm) in length. As an adult, he stood approximately eighteen inches (46 cm) tall.

Eckhardt spoke openly about his condition and often responded to questions about it with humour. Although he sometimes described himself as having been "snapped off at the waist", he rejected the idea that he wished he had legs, remarking, "Why would I want those? Then I'd have pants to press." He also challenged others by asking, "What can you do that I can't do, except tread water?"

== Professional career ==
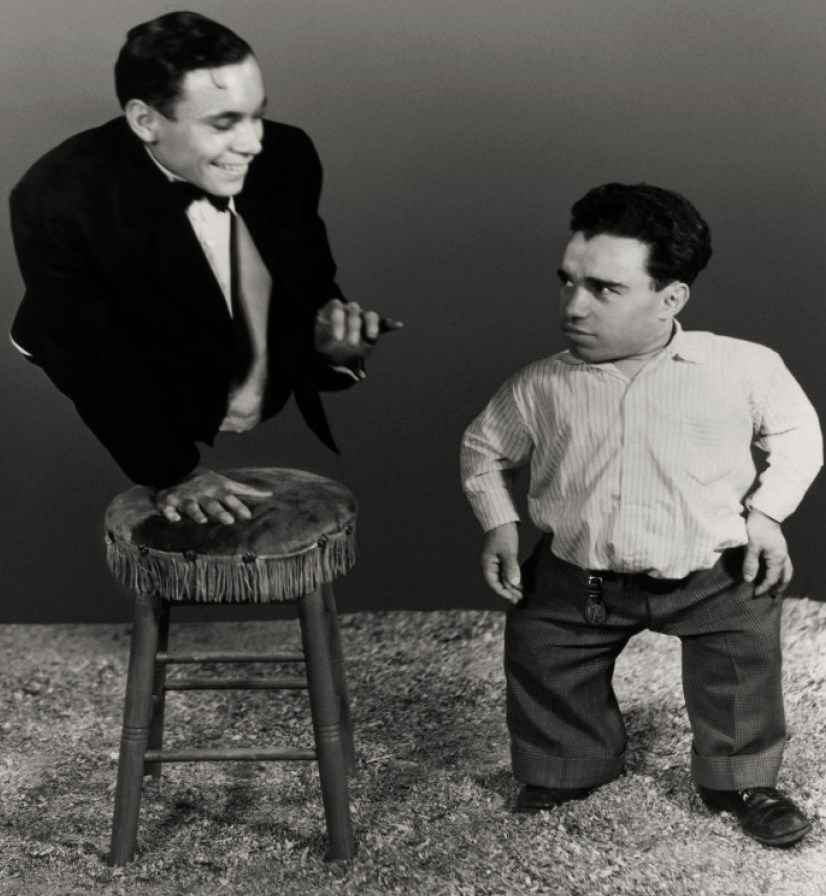
Eck (left) as Half-Boy in Freaks, with his co-star Rossitto as Angeleno

In late 1923, Eck and his brother attended a performance of stage magic at a local church by John McAslan. When McAslan asked for volunteers for his act, 12-year-old Eck bounded onto the stage on his hands to the surprise of the magician. McAslan convinced Eck to join the sideshow with him as manager; Eck agreed, but only if his brother was also employed. Robert was charged by his mother with looking after his brother. His parents signed a one-year contract, which Eck attested the magician later changed to a ten-year contract by adding a zero. In 1924, Eck left McAslan and signed on with a carny named Captain John Sheesley.

Eck was billed as a single-o (solo sideshow act), though he traveled with Robert and used Robert's normality to emphasize his own abnormal physique. His performance included sleight-of-hand and acrobatic feats including his famous one-armed handstand. Eck often performed in a tuxedo jacket while perched upon a tasseled stool. Eck performed for the Ringling Brothers, Barnum and Bailey, and others.

=== Film ===
In 1931, while performing in Montreal after appearing at the Canadian Exhibition, Eckhardt was approached by a talent scout from Metro-Goldwyn-Mayer (MGM) and cast as the "Half-Boy" in director Tod Browning's 1932 film Freaks.

On the set of Freaks, Eckhardt developed a close working relationship with Browning, who encouraged him to remain at his side whenever possible between scenes. Eckhardt later recalled Browning telling him, "Whenever I have an empty seat or chair, you are to sit alongside me while we shoot."

Although Eckhardt tried to get to know the other performers, he later said that he never felt entirely comfortable among the cast, describing them as "a happy, noisy crowd" that was "childish, silly and in a world all their own". He also joked that the cast had gone "Hollywood" by "wear[ing] sunglasses and acting funny". During production, fellow performer Pete Robinson had difficulty lying on a blanket for one scene, prompting Eckhardt to joke that, if he had legs, he would have preferred to lie on a fakir's bed of nails.

Eckhardt later said that nearly 30 minutes of footage were removed from Freaks by censors and that much of his own performance was lost from the final version.

Following the release of Freaks, Eckhardt portrayed a bird creature known as the "Gooney Bird" in Tarzan the Ape Man (1932), Tarzan Escapes (1936), and Tarzan's Secret Treasure (1941). The costume was created from a full-body cast made during the production of Freaks.

=== Famous illusion ===
In 1937, Eck and Robert were recruited by the illusionist and hypnotist Rajah Raboid, for his "Miracles of 1937" show. In it they performed a magic feat that amazed audiences. Raboid performed the traditional sawing-a-man-in-half illusion, except with an unexpected twist. At first Robert would pretend to be a member of the audience and heckle the illusionist during his routine, resulting in Robert being called on stage to be sawed in half himself. During the illusion, Robert would then be switched with Eck, who played the top half of his body, and a dwarf who played the bottom half, concealed in specially-built pant legs. After seeming to have been sawn off, the legs would suddenly get up and start running away, prompting Eck to jump off the table and start chasing them around the stage, screaming, "Come back!" "I want my legs back!" Sometimes he even chased the legs into the audience. The subsequent reaction was amazing – people would scream and sometimes even flee the theater in terror. As Eck described it, "The men were more frightened than the women – the women couldn't move because the men were walking across their laps, headed for the exit." The act provided the perfect jolt by frightening people at first but then caused just as much laughter and applause. The illusion would end with stage hands plucking up Eck and setting him atop "his" legs and then twirling him off-stage to be replaced by his twin, Robert, who would then loudly threaten to sue Raboid and storm out of the theater. Their act was so popular that they played to packed audiences up and down the East Coast.

=== Other ventures ===
In addition to his work as a sideshow performer and actor, Eckhardt pursued a variety of other ventures throughout his career. During the 1930s, he and his brother Robert formed a 12-piece orchestra in Baltimore, with Eckhardt serving as conductor while Robert played the piano.

After the popularity of sideshows declined, the brothers operated a penny arcade in Baltimore until a business tax forced them to close it.

During the 1950s, the brothers purchased and operated a children's miniature train ride in a local park, where Eckhardt served as conductor. They also performed Punch and Judy shows for neighbourhood children who visited their home.

Eckhardt was also an enthusiastic race car driver and owned a custom-built, street-legal vehicle known as the "Johnny Eck Special". In 1938, he climbed the Washington Monument on his hands.

== Artistic pursuits ==
From an early age, Eckhardt was drawn to art and craftsmanship. As a child, he and his brother Robert spent hours carving and painting elaborate miniature circuses with fully articulated figures.

Throughout his life, Eckhardt continued to draw and paint, often choosing subjects such as young women, ships, and himself. Later in life, he became a screen painter after learning the craft from William Oktavec, a Baltimore grocer and folk artist who introduced the art form in 1913. In 1989, Eckhardt was interviewed about screen painting in the documentary film The Screen Painters.

Eckhardt was also an accomplished model-maker. Actress Olga Baclanova recalled that, after filming Freaks, he gave her a miniature circus ring made from matches in her honour. Throughout his life, he continued to create detailed models and handcrafted objects.

== Later life ==
When sideshows lost popular appeal, the Eckhardt brothers returned to their red brick rowhouse at 622 North Milton Avenue, in the East-side, working-class section of Baltimore. This was the same house that the family had lived in since 1906, and is where the Eckhardt brothers resided for the rest of their lives.

Eck would sit on the steps of his porch with his Chihuahua, Major, telling stories about his life. He and his brother often performed Punch and Judy shows for the children who would come to visit. However, the Eckhardts' neighborhood was increasingly becoming less safe because of drugs and crime.

The 1980s brought more visitors as the video release of Freaks attracted a new generation of fans, some of whom Eck wasn't entirely comfortable with, telling a friend, "You'd be surprised to see these 'avid' fans. I say they are crazy."

But he also expressed dismay at his own circumstances. Despite having a notable career that ran back to the 1920s, Eck had very little to show materially for his successes – which he attributed to being taken advantage of over the years by unscrupulous managers, "sharp crooks", and even "best friends." Describing the situation of fans dropping by his rowhouse on Milton, Eck wrote to a close friend in 1985, "I am so embarrassed – I would love to be financially able to entertain these wonderful people in a refined way – a tiny sandwich, cold Cola or something..."

In January 1987, the then 76-year-old Eckhardt brothers were robbed in an ordeal that lasted several hours. One of the two thieves mocked and sat on Eck while the other took his belongings. Thereafter, Eck went into seclusion, and the brothers no longer invited visitors into their home. Eck would go on to say, "If I want to see freaks, all I have to do is look out the window."

== Death ==
On January 5, 1991, Eck had a heart attack in his sleep, dying at age 79 at the home where he was born. Robert died on February 25, 1995, aged 83. They are buried under one headstone in Green Mount Cemetery, Baltimore.

== Biographical film ==
Since the 1990s, Leonardo DiCaprio has pursued making a Hollywood feature film on the life of Johnny Eck, to be written by Caroline Thompson, the scriptwriter of Edward Scissorhands, and produced by Pelagius Films and by Joseph Fries, with DiCaprio and Joseph Rappa as executive producers. Production notes include James Franco as a possible lead, playing both the Eckhardt twins.

== In popular culture ==
- Tom Waits's song "Table Top Joe", which describes a man without a lower body who becomes a famous entertainer, is based loosely on the life of Johnny Eck.
- He is also mentioned in the piece "Lucky Day (Overture)" on Waits's album The Black Rider.
- A character inspired by Eck makes a brief appearance in a Victorian sideshow in the Doctor Who novel Camera Obscura, by Lloyd Rose.

== Bibliography ==
- American Sideshow: An Encyclopedia of History's Most Wondrous and Curiously Strange Performers (Tarcher/Penguin, 2005) by Marc Hartzman. Johnny Eck and his twin brother are featured on the cover.
- Hornberger, Francine (April 1, 2005). Carny Folk: The World's Weirdest Sideshow Acts. Citadel Press. p. 244. ISBN 0-8065-2661-0.
- Skal, David J. The Monster Show, pages 145–6. Second edition, 2002. Faber And Faber, New York. ISBN 0-571-19996-8
- Raymond, Warren A. (2014) The Johnny Eck Photo Album First Edition, Wolf's Head Press, Silver Spring, MD. ASIN B00MJ8QTUG.
