= Middle East, Baltimore =

- Neighborhood of Baltimore
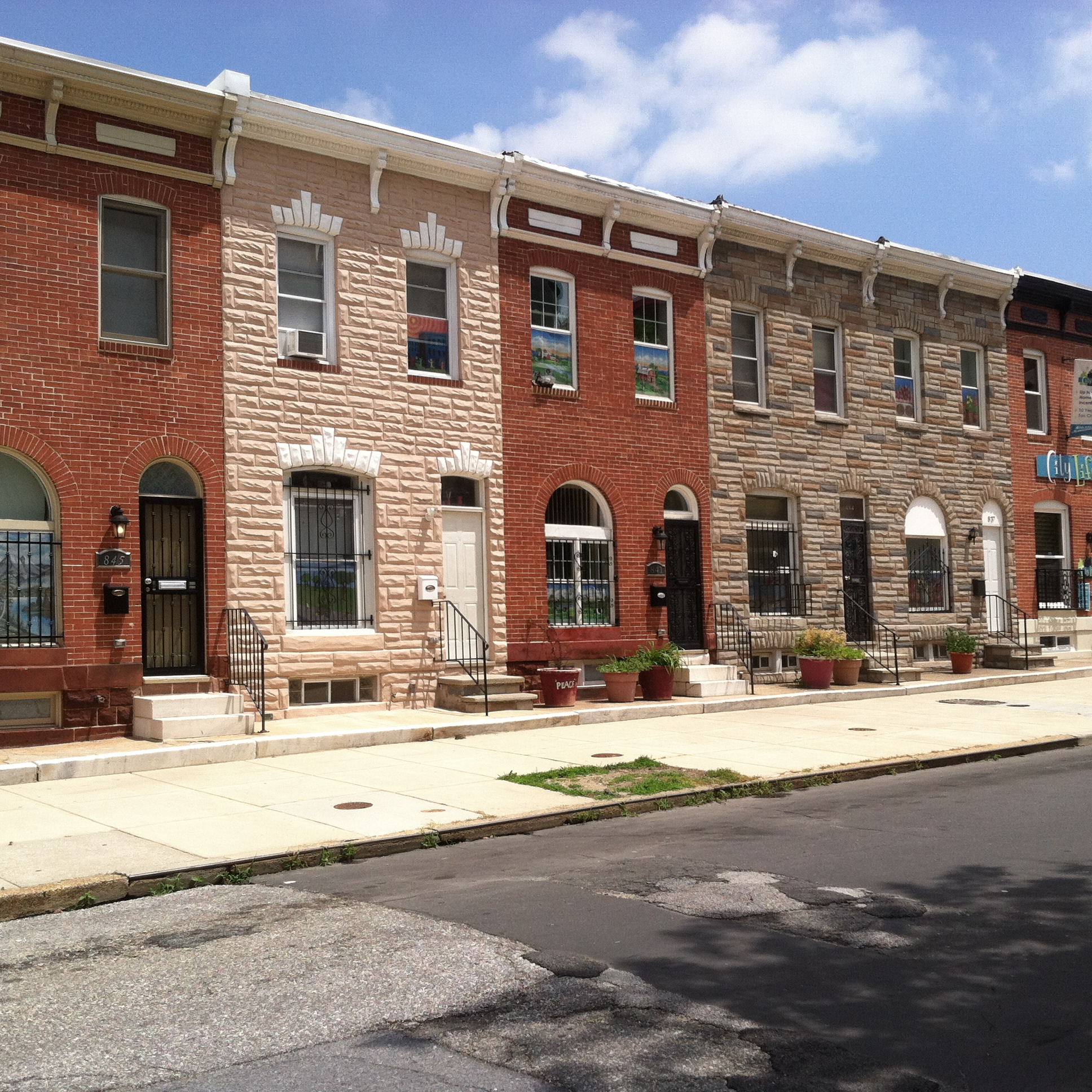
- Row homes in Middle East in June 2014

- Location within Baltimore
- Coordinates: 39°17′55.68″N 76°35′16.08″W
- Country: United States
- State: Maryland
- City: Baltimore
- Named for: Middle East
- ZIP Code: 21205
- Area codes: 410, 443, and 667

Middle East is a neighborhood in the heart of East Baltimore, Maryland.

It is the site of a conflict between residents and the city's plans for creating a biotech park to serve nearby Johns Hopkins Hospital. The neighborhood has suffered from extensive urban decay and housing abandonment, increased crime, and the effects of the Baltimore riot of 1968. Its residents are mainly lower income African Americans.

The neighborhood was a filming location for the Baltimore-based HBO drama The Wire. Middle East is also noteworthy as being a location for the filming of scenes of the television series Homicide: Life on the Street and the 1991 film Homicide featuring Joe Mantegna. The swath of land between Johns Hopkins Hospital and Frank C. Bocek Park, which includes much of Middle East, is often referred to as the "Down the Hill" neighborhood by local residents.

== History ==
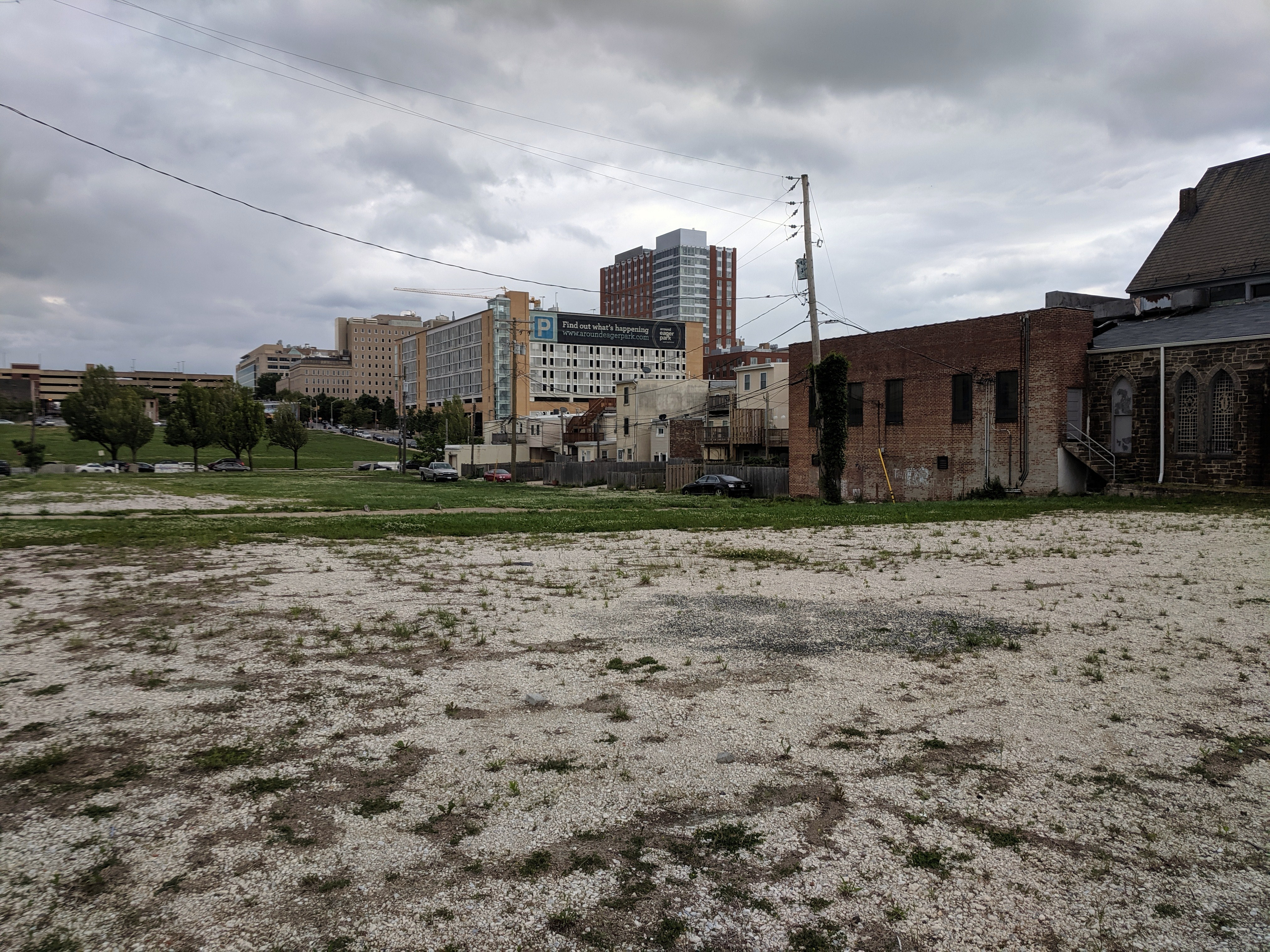
An empty field close to Johns Hopkins that once held a city block of rowhouses. The block was demolished to make way for a future Johns Hopkins-related development, May 2019.

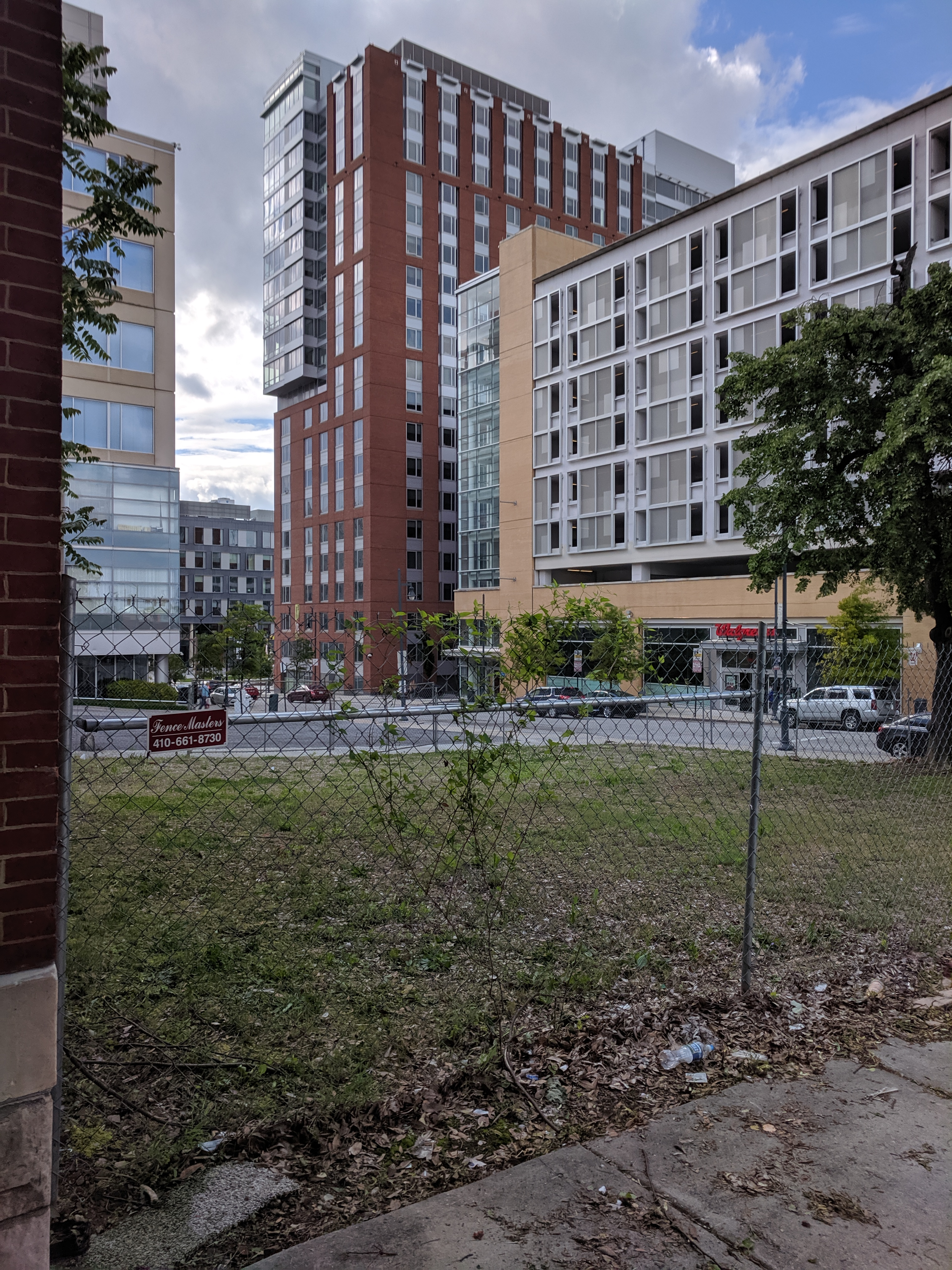
Former location of the building that housed Bohemian and Moravian Presbyterian Church and Freedom Temple AME Zion Church, May 2019. The building was demolished in 2016 after being purchased by Johns Hopkins to clear room for a future medical-related facility.

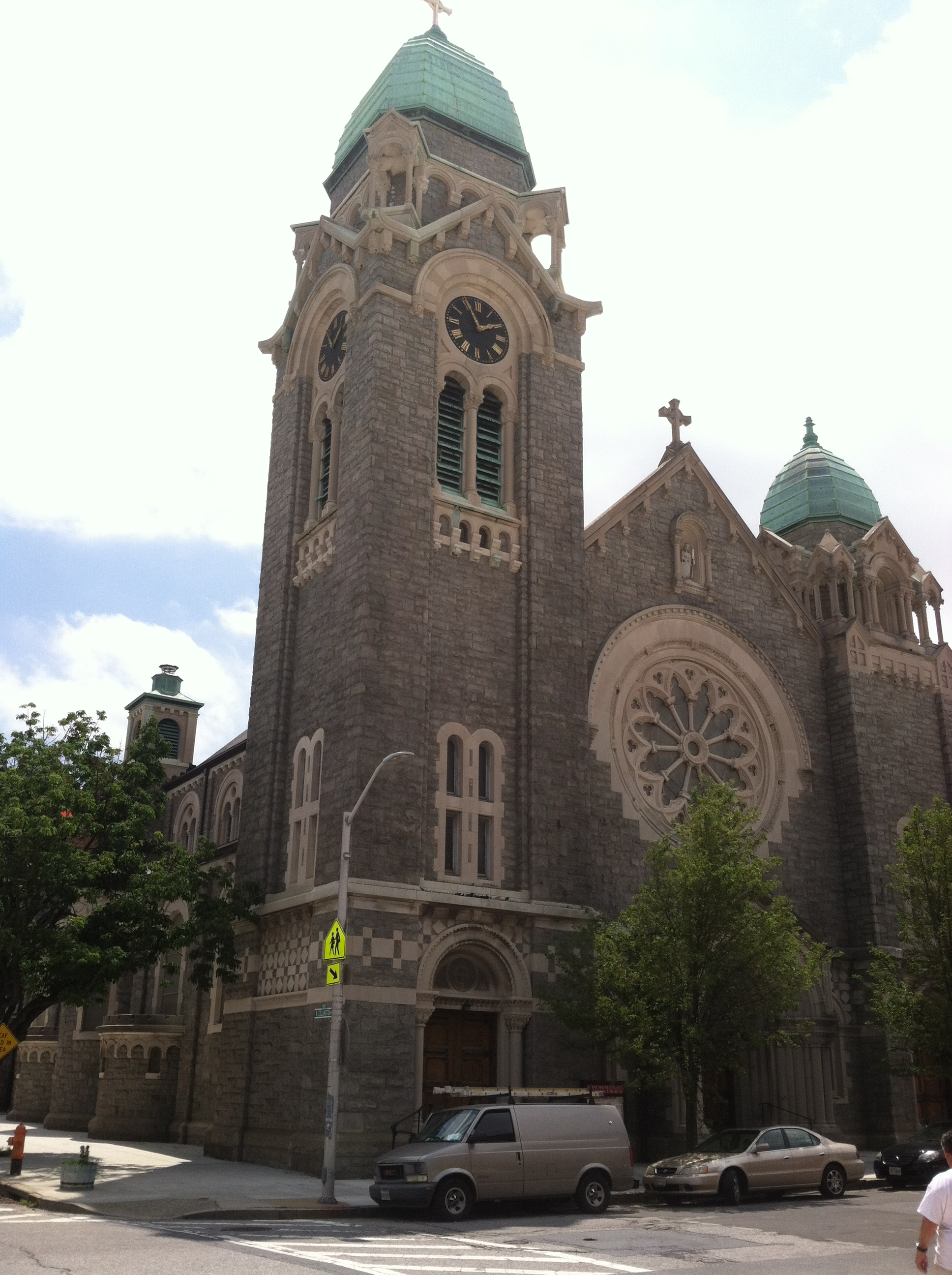
St. Wenceslaus, June 2014.

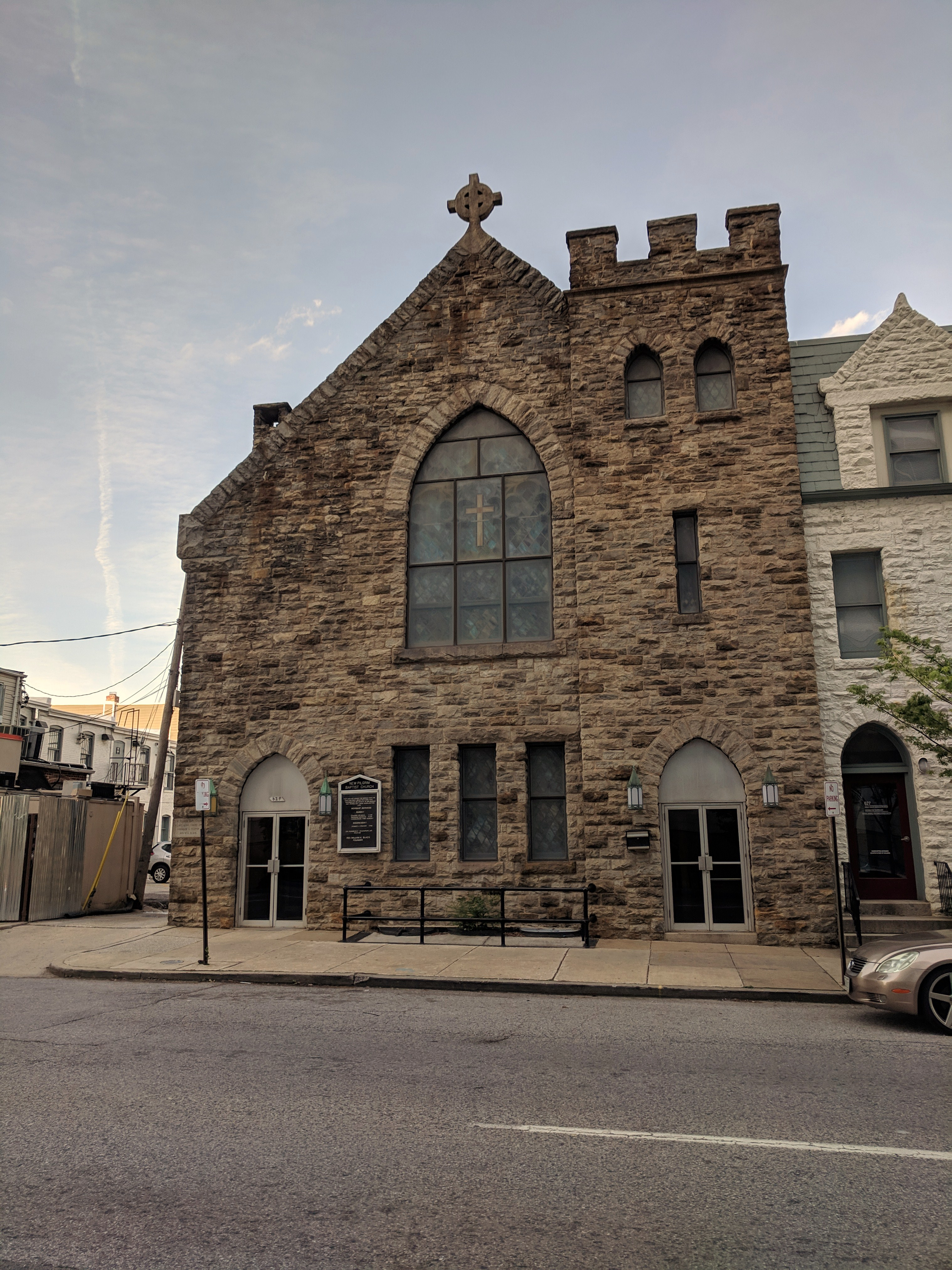
New Pilgrim Baptist Church on North Washington Street, also the former location of Mount Tabor Bohemian Methodist Episcopal Church, May 2019.

The neighborhood formerly had a white working-class Czech-American majority and is home to St. Wenceslaus Church, a historically Czech parish that is now majority African-American. The Middle East neighborhood and surrounding areas were then known colloquially as "Little Bohemia."

By 1969, the Czech-American immigrant community in what is now the Middle East neighborhood was predominantly composed of ageing homeowners who lived alongside more recently arrived African-American residents. However, many of the older white Czech-Americans harbored racist attitudes towards black people. According to a reporter with 'The Baltimore Sun', "The older people of Bohemian extraction still live in the houses they own...but they share the neighborhood with black people whom they do not seem to appreciate or understand." This was the last generation of Czech-Americans to remain in Little Bohemia in large numbers, with the neighborhood transitioning into a predominantly African-American neighborhood by the 1970s and 1980s.

The name "Middle East" came about in 1978, when low-income African-American residents of the neighborhood requested funding from the city to repair the urban decay. There were 200 vacant homes in Middle East in 1978. Over a period of three years, $800,000 of federal grant funding was allocated.

As of 2019, only a few traces of the Czech-American community still remain, as many Czech-Americans have moved to the suburbs primarily due to white flight and the decline of industrial manufacturing jobs. St. Wenceslaus is a thriving parish, as the ethnic character of the congregation has undergone a gradual shift from a mostly white working-class Czech parish to one that is multicultural and multiracial, first as many Poles and Lithuanians moved into the neighborhood, and then as the neighborhood shifted to having an African American majority. The neighborhood has suffered from extensive urban decay and housing abandonment due to poverty and crime, as well as the after-effects of the Baltimore riot of 1968, and now has a largely poverty-class and working-class African-American majority. The neighborhood was one of the hardest hit in Baltimore, as the white-working class and middle-class African-American tax base left and the area was effected by epidemics of heroin, crack cocaine, and HIV, along with an intensification of gang activity fueled by the drug trade. The predatory practices of lenders, landlords, and property flippers have also contributed to the spiraling cycle of decline and disinvestment. By 2000, Middle East was the second poorest neighborhood in Baltimore, with a median household income of $14,900, less than half the city’s median. Less than half of all adults were employed in the labor force and over a third of households had poverty-level incomes. Crime and domestic violence rates were double those of the city as a whole, and the incidence of lead poisoning and child abuse were among the highest in Baltimore.

Middle East is the site of ongoing and extensive gentrification and many buildings have been leveled to make way for the expansion of the Johns Hopkins School of Medicine. In 2002, the East Baltimore Development Initiative (EBDI) was founded, becoming one of the most aggressive and ambitious initiates for urban redevelopment in recent American history. There have been many delays and controversies over the past 17 years, as Johns Hopkins has attempted to transform the neighborhood into a biotech hub amid accusations of gentrification. 740 families have been displaced and relocated, making way for a new public school, planned amenities including shops, and a public park, in an attempt to attract top scientists and entrepreneurs from around the world and transform the urban landscape from a working-class African-American neighborhood into one that is mixed-income and mixed-race. These effects have been criticized as racist and classist and have been referred to as a "big institution pushing out a vulnerable community for its benefit" by Lawrence Brown, a critical urbanist at Morgan State University. Marisela Gomez, an activist against gentrification, has claimed that black, brown, and low-income residents are being unfairly targeted.

== Location ==
Middle East is bordered by East Biddle Street to the north, North Broadway to the west, Bradford Street to the east, and East Fayette Street to the south. Clockwise from the northwest, it is bordered by the neighborhoods of Oliver and Broadway East to the north; Biddle Street, Milton-Milford, McElderry Park, and Patterson Place to the east; Butchers Hill and Washington Hill to the south; and Dunbar-Broadway and Gay Street to the west.

== Demographics ==
As of the census of 2010, there were 5,352 people living in the neighborhood. The ethnic makeup of Middle East was 87.5% African American, 4.9% White, 0.9% Asian, 5.9% Hispanic or Latino, 0.3% Native American, 0.6% from other ethnicities, and 0.7% from two or more ethnicities. 35.6% of occupied housing units were owner-occupied. 29.6% of housing units were vacant.

35.8% of the population were employed, 11.0% were unemployed, and 53.4% were not in the labor force. The median household income was $15,493. About 43.7% of families and 45.7% of the population were below the poverty line. As of 2022, the average household income of Middle East is $56,240 USD.

== Northeast Market ==
Northeast Market, which was originally built and constructed in 1885, was one of the cornerstone markets in Baltimore. The market has received two renovations since its original build and construction in 1885. The market in 2013 has received over two million dollars in renovations.
