= Madison-Eastend, Baltimore =

- Neighborhood of Baltimore
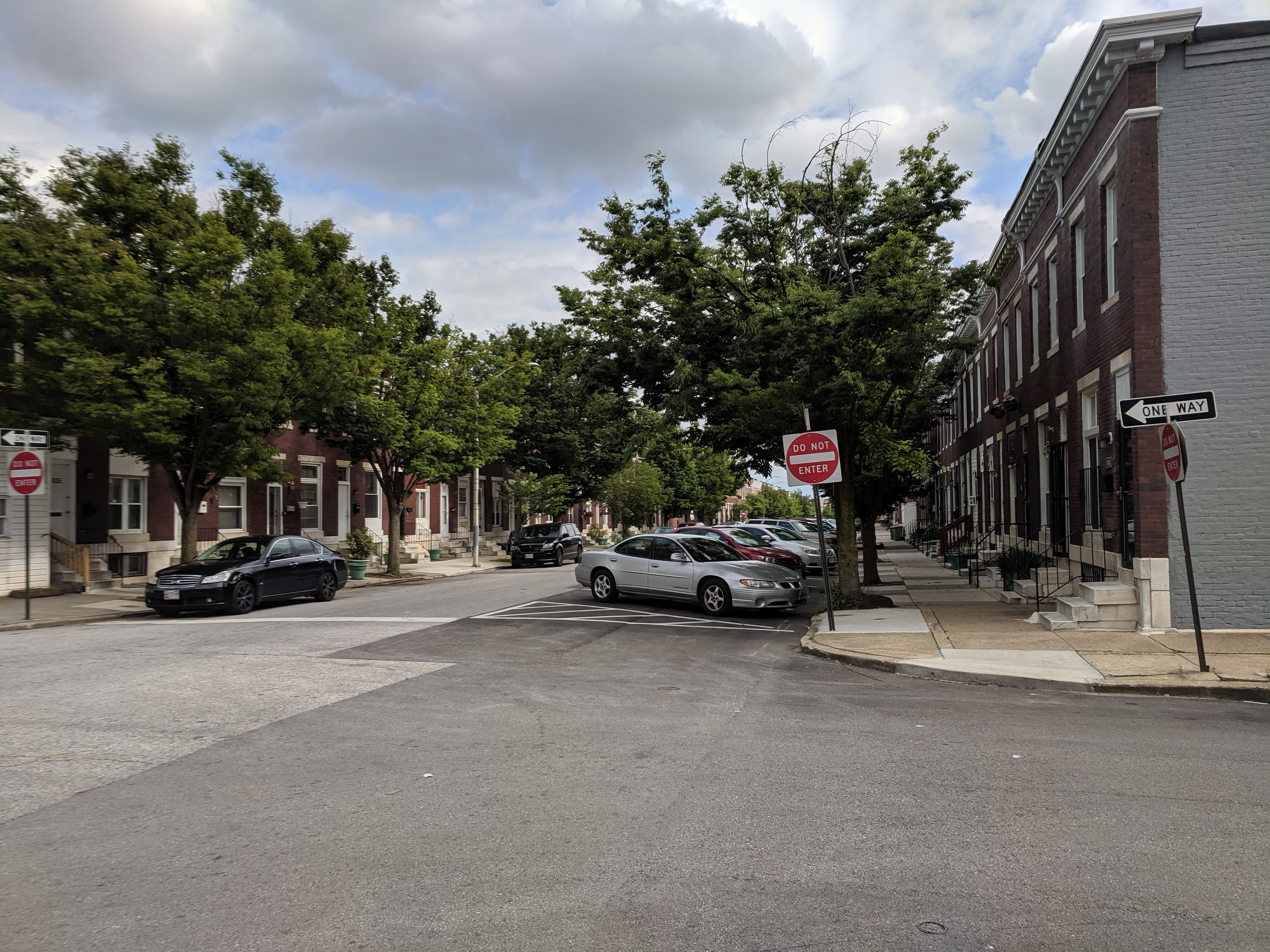

- Location within Baltimore
- Coordinates: 39°18′2.88″N 76°34′37.2″W
- Country: United States
- State: Maryland
- City: Baltimore
- ZIP Code: 21205
- Area codes: 410, 443, and 667

Madison-Eastend is a neighborhood in the heart of East Baltimore, Maryland. Madison-Eastend occupies 66.7 acres of land north of Patterson Park and south of Amtrak's Northeast Corridor. The neighborhood is bounded by the neighborhoods of Ellwood Park and McElderry Park to the south, Milton-Montford to the west, Biddle Street to the north, and Orangeville to the east. The swath of land between Johns Hopkins Hospital and Frank C Bocek Park, which includes Madison-Eastend, is often referred to as the "Down the Hill" neighborhood by local residents.

== Demographics ==
Madison-Eastend is 90% African-American. The neighborhood is one of the least expensive neighborhoods in the United States, with the median price of housing being less than $50,000.

== Health ==
Life expectancy is between 63 and 69 years old. Madison-Eastend suffers from high levels of cancer, HIV/AIDS, and homicide compared to other neighborhoods of Baltimore. There is a brownfield in Madison-Eastend due to environmental contamination caused by factories, refineries, and other businesses polluting the land and water. Trains used the area to dump coal, causing the land at the brownfield to become hard and blackened by oil.

== History ==
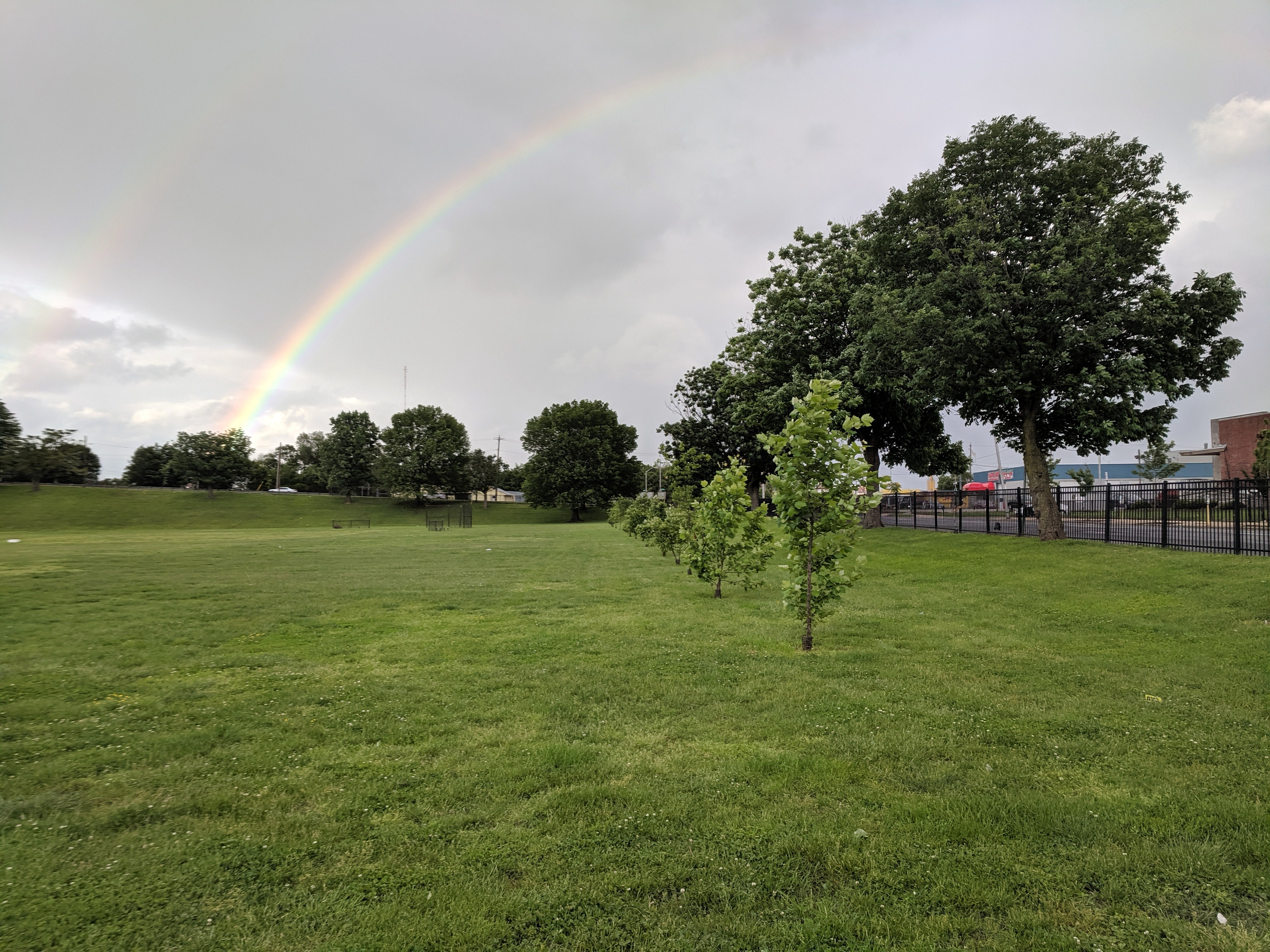
Frank C Bocek Park in Madison-Eastend, May 2019.

The majority of the neighborhood lies within the East Monument Historic District. The district is historically significant due to the large Czech-American (Bohemian) immigrant community that once lived in the area. Madison-Eastend has since transitioned to a majority African-American neighborhood.

In the late 1800s and early 1900s, the Bohemian stronghold north of Johns Hopkins Hospital along the Baltimore to New York Amtrak line all the way to Frank C Bocek Park was known by the now mostly forgotten name of "Swampoodle". Frank C Bocek Park was nicknamed the "clay hill". There was a swamp behind the clay hill, the source of the neighborhood being named Swampoodle. The heart of the Bohemian "hollow" of Swampoodle was located just north of Johns Hopkins Hospital along the tiny side streets of Barnes and Abbott.
