= Kasejovice =

- Town
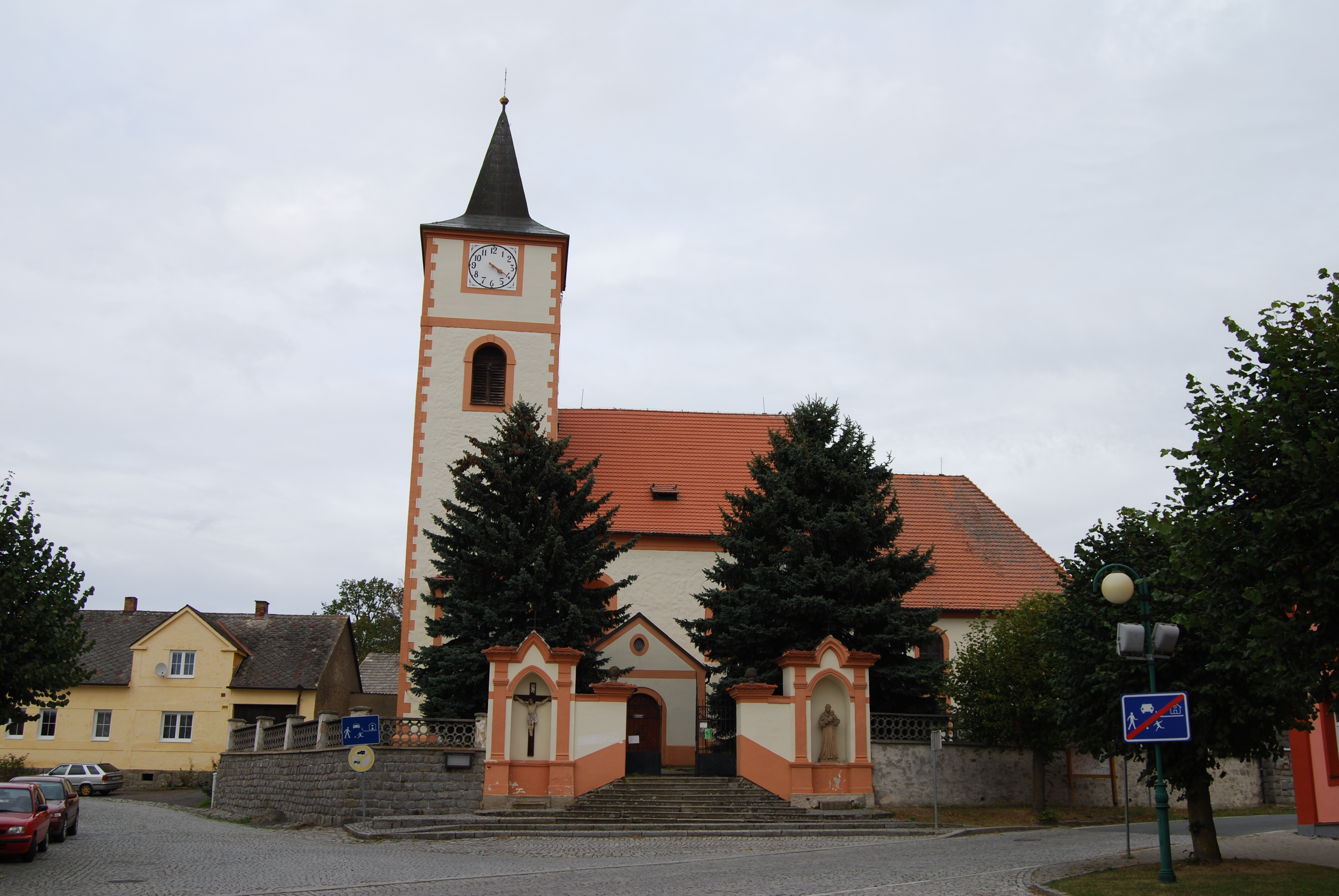
- Church of Saint James the Great

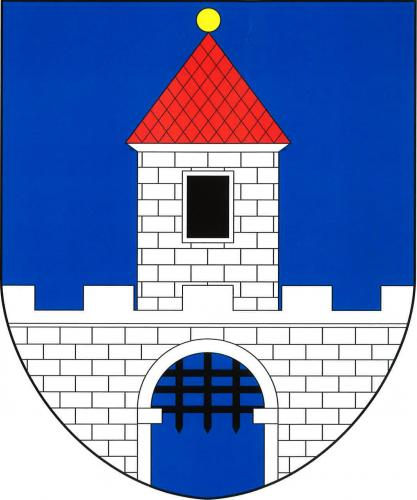
- Flag Coat of arms

- Location in the Czech Republic
- Coordinates: 49°27′46″N 13°44′30″E
- Country: Czech Republic
- Region: Plzeň
- District: Plzeň-South
- First mentioned: 1264

Government
  - Mayor: Václav Jakubčík

Area
  - Total: 34.40 km^{2} (13.28 sq mi)
- Elevation: 548 m (1,798 ft)

Population (2026-01-01)
  - Total: 1,368
  - Density: 39.77/km^{2} (103.0/sq mi)
- Time zone: UTC+1 (CET)
  - Summer (DST): UTC+2 (CEST)
- Postal code: 335 44
- Website: www.kasejovice.cz

Kasejovice (Czech pronunciation: [ˈkasɛjovɪtsɛ]; German: Kassowitz) is a town in Plzeň-South District in the Plzeň Region of the Czech Republic. It has about 1,400 inhabitants.

== Administrative division ==
Kasejovice consists of eight municipal parts (in brackets population according to the 2021 census):

- Kasejovice (862)
- Chloumek (63)
- Kladrubce (76)
- Podhůří (37)
- Polánka (58)
- Přebudov (8)
- Řesanice (84)
- Újezd u Kasejovic (58)

== Etymology ==
The name of the settlement was originally written as Kasějovice and was derived from the personal name Kasěj, meaning "the village of Kasěj's people".

== Geography ==
Kasejovice is located about 39 kilometres (24 mi) southwest of Plzeň. It lies in the Blatná Uplands. The highest point is at 629 m (2,064 ft) above sea level. There are several fishponds in the territory of Kasejovice.

== History ==
The first written mention of Kasejovice is from 1264. From 1348, it was referred to as a market town. In 1878, Kasejovice was promoted to a town.

== Demographics ==
Historical population

Year	Pop.	±%
1869	3,663	—
1880	3,699	+1.0%
1890	3,194	−13.7%
1900	3,027	−5.2%
1910	2,955	−2.4%

Year	Pop.	±%
1921	2,890	−2.2%
1930	2,680	−7.3%
1950	2,159	−19.4%
1961	2,002	−7.3%
1970	1,698	−15.2%

Year	Pop.	±%
1980	1,526	−10.1%
1991	1,363	−10.7%
2001	1,280	−6.1%
2011	1,266	−1.1%
2021	1,246	−1.6%

Source: Censuses

== Transport ==
The I/20 road (part of the European route E49) from Plzeň to České Budějovice runs through the town.

Kasejovice is located on the railway line Blatná–Nepomuk.

== Sights ==
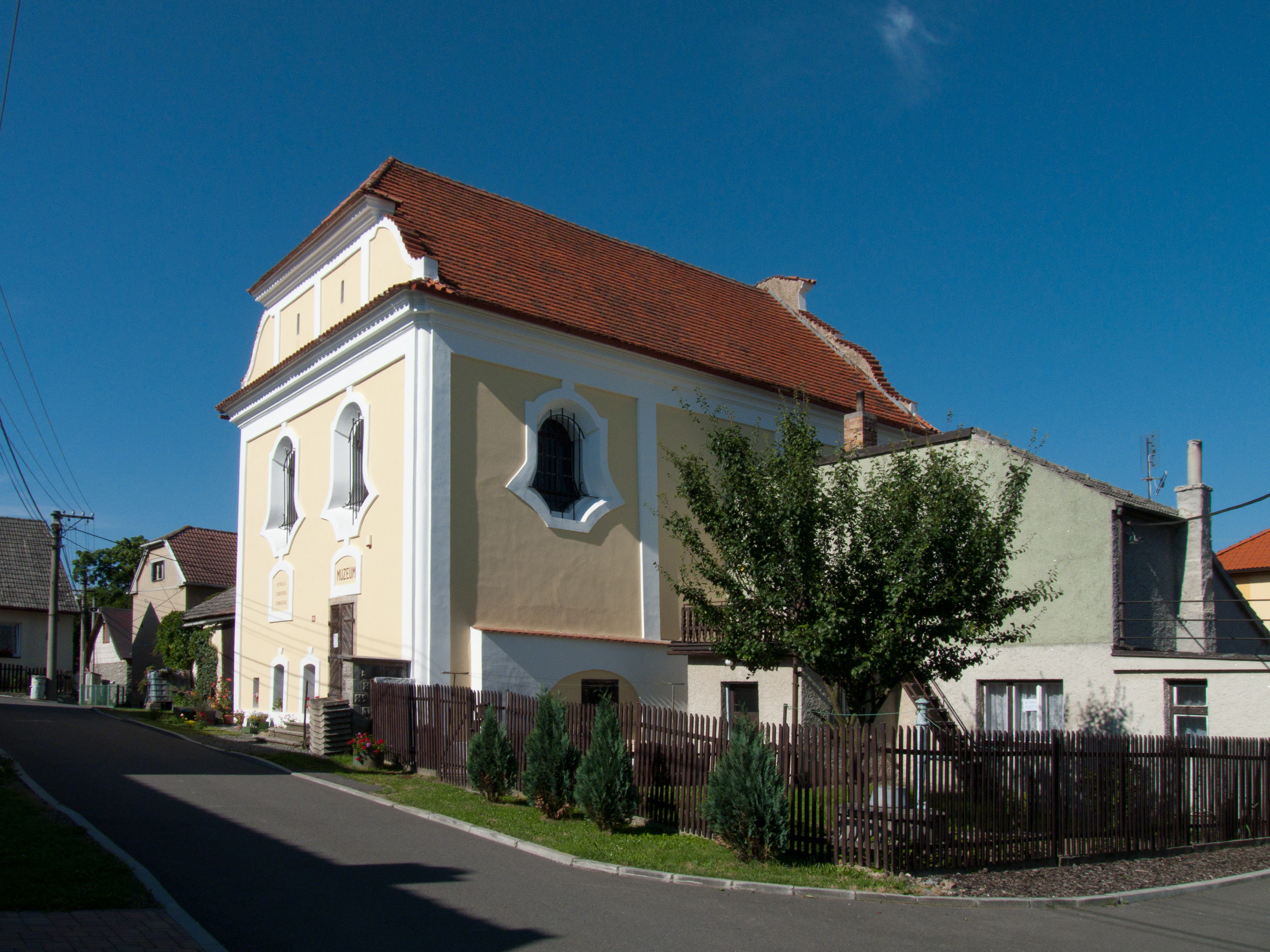
Former synagogue, now the town museum

The main landmark of Kasejovice is the Church of Saint James the Great. It was built in the early Gothic style in the 13th century and modified in the Baroque style at the beginning of the 18th century and in 1797.

Among the most valuable buildings is the town hall. It was built in the late Renaissance style in 1694, after the original town hall, first documented in 1564, burned down.

The former synagogue was built in the late Baroque style in 1763. Today it houses the town museum. There is also a Jewish cemetery on the outskirts of the town.

The almost entire area of Řesanice is protected as a village monument zone. There are brick single-storey houses with gables and granaries from the 19th century, which are typical examples of regional vernacular architecture. The main landmark of Řesanice is the Church of All Saints. It was built in the early Gothic style in the mid-13th century, but has also Romanesque elements and is among the oldest buildings in the region. Its current appearance is a result of late Gothic and minor Baroque modifications.

== Notable people ==
- Wenceslas Bojer (1795–1856), botanist and traveller
- William Oktavec (1884–1956), American artist
