= History of Lithuanians in Baltimore =

The history of Lithuanians in Baltimore dates back to the mid-19th century. Thousands of Lithuanians immigrated to Baltimore between the 1880s and 1920s. The Lithuanian American community was mainly centered in what is now the Hollins–Roundhouse Historic District. Baltimore's Lithuanian community has founded several institutions to preserve the Lithuanian heritage of the city, including a Roman Catholic parish, a cultural festival, a dance hall, and a yeshiva.

== Demographics ==
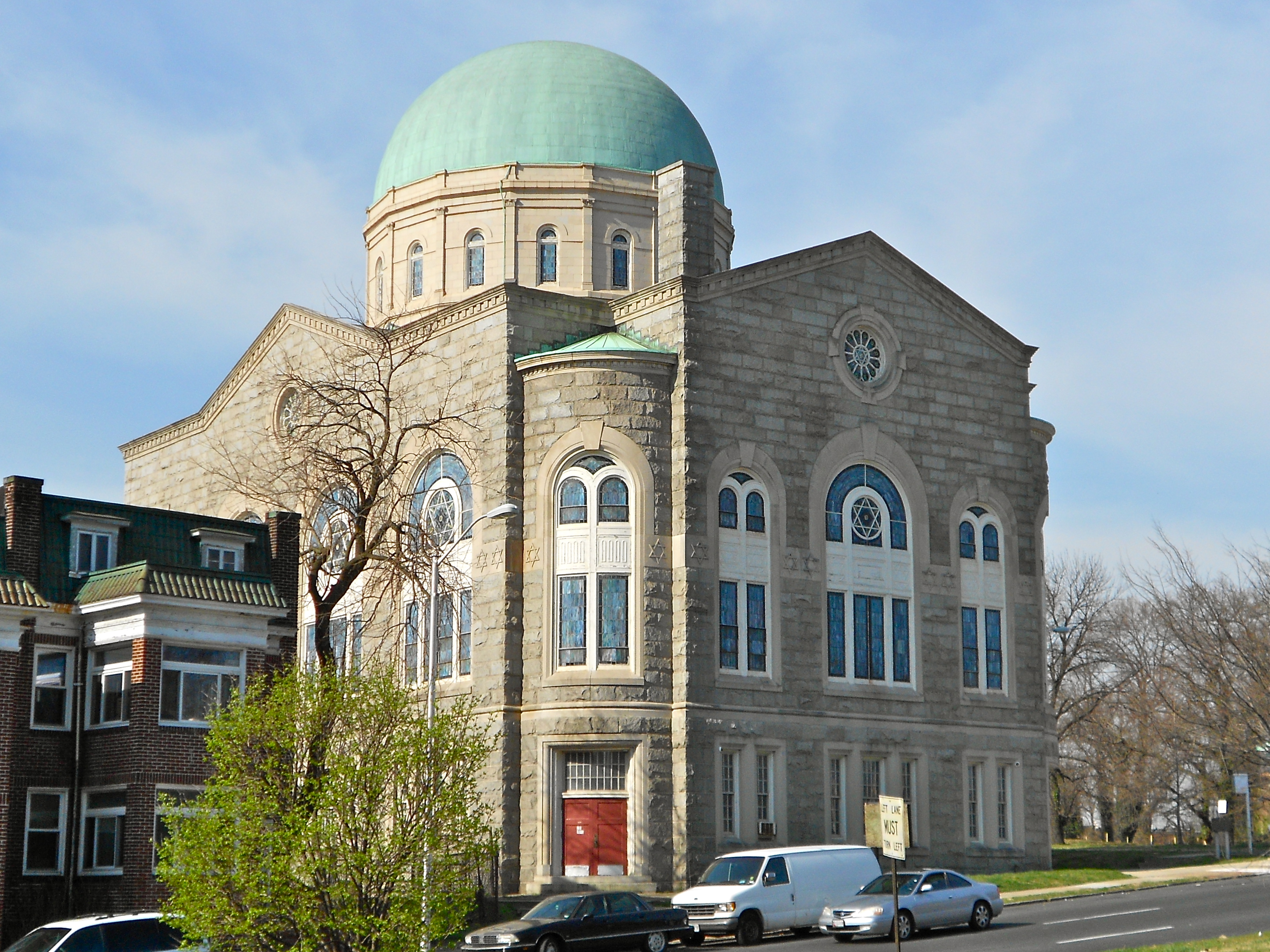
Shaarei Tfiloh Synagogue, March 2012.

In 1920, 2,554 foreign-born White people in Baltimore spoke either the Lithuanian language or the Latvian language.

In 1940, 2,839 immigrants from Lithuania lived in Baltimore. These immigrants comprised 4.7% of the city's foreign-born white population.

In the 1960 United States census, Lithuanian-Americans comprised 44% of the foreign-born population in South Baltimore's tract 22–2.

By 1991, there were an estimated 20,000 Lithuanians living in the Baltimore area.

The Lithuanian community in the Baltimore metropolitan area numbered 11,024 as of 2000, making up 0.4% of the area's population. In the same year Baltimore city's Lithuanian population was 1,519, 0.2% of the city's population.

In 2013, an estimated 1,092 Lithuanian-Americans resided in Baltimore city, 0.2% of the population. As of September 2014, immigrants from Lithuania were the 102nd largest foreign-born population in Baltimore.

== History ==
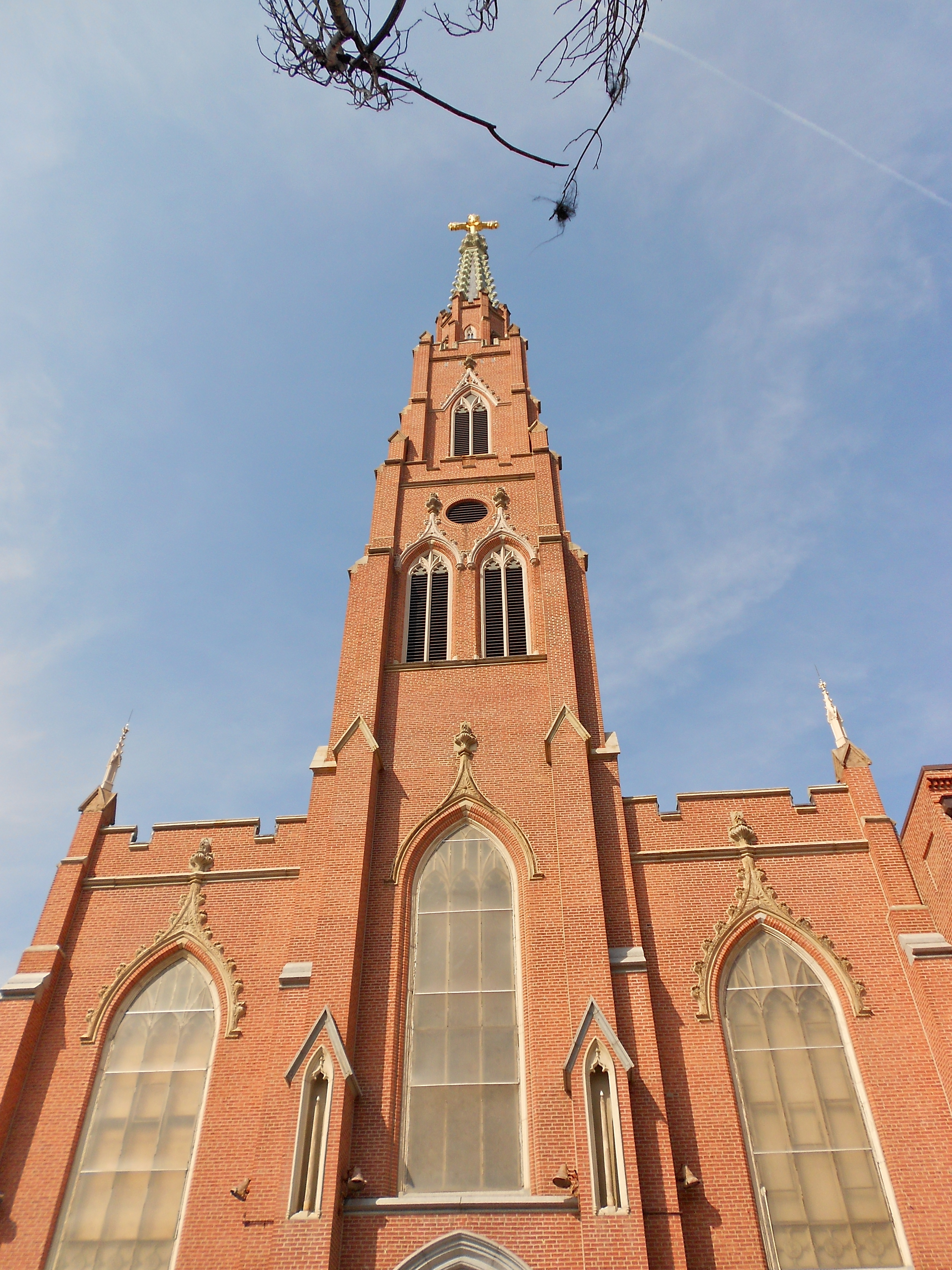
St. Alphonsus Church, Rectory, Convent and Halle, March 2012.

Lithuanians began to settle in Baltimore in 1876. The wave increased greatly during the 1880s and continued in large numbers until the 1920s. By 1950, the Lithuanian community numbered around 9,000. These Lithuanians settled primarily in a neighborhood north of Hollins Street that became known as Baltimore's Little Lithuania.

In 1889, Jonas Šliūpas founded the Lithuanian Scientific Society in Baltimore. It promoted Lithuanian language and culture and was active until 1896.

Three Roman Catholic churches have been designated as Lithuanian parishes: St. Alphonsus' beginning in 1917, St. John the Baptist Church from 1888 to 1917, and St. Wenceslaus beginning in 1872. St. Alphonsus' is the only remaining Lithuanian parish in Baltimore, as St. Wenceslaus was re-designated as a Bohemian parish and St. John the Baptist Church closed in 1989.

While most Lithuanians who settled in Baltimore were Roman Catholic, a large minority were Lithuanian Jews. Between the 1880s and the 1920s, Lithuanian Jews (also known as Litvaks) were a major component of Jewish immigration to Baltimore. The Yeshivas Ner Yisroel, a prominent yeshiva in Baltimore, was founded as a Lithuanian (Litvish)-style Talmudic college by Jews from Lithuania and Belarus. Litvaks also helped found the B'nai Israel Synagogue.

== Little Lithuania ==
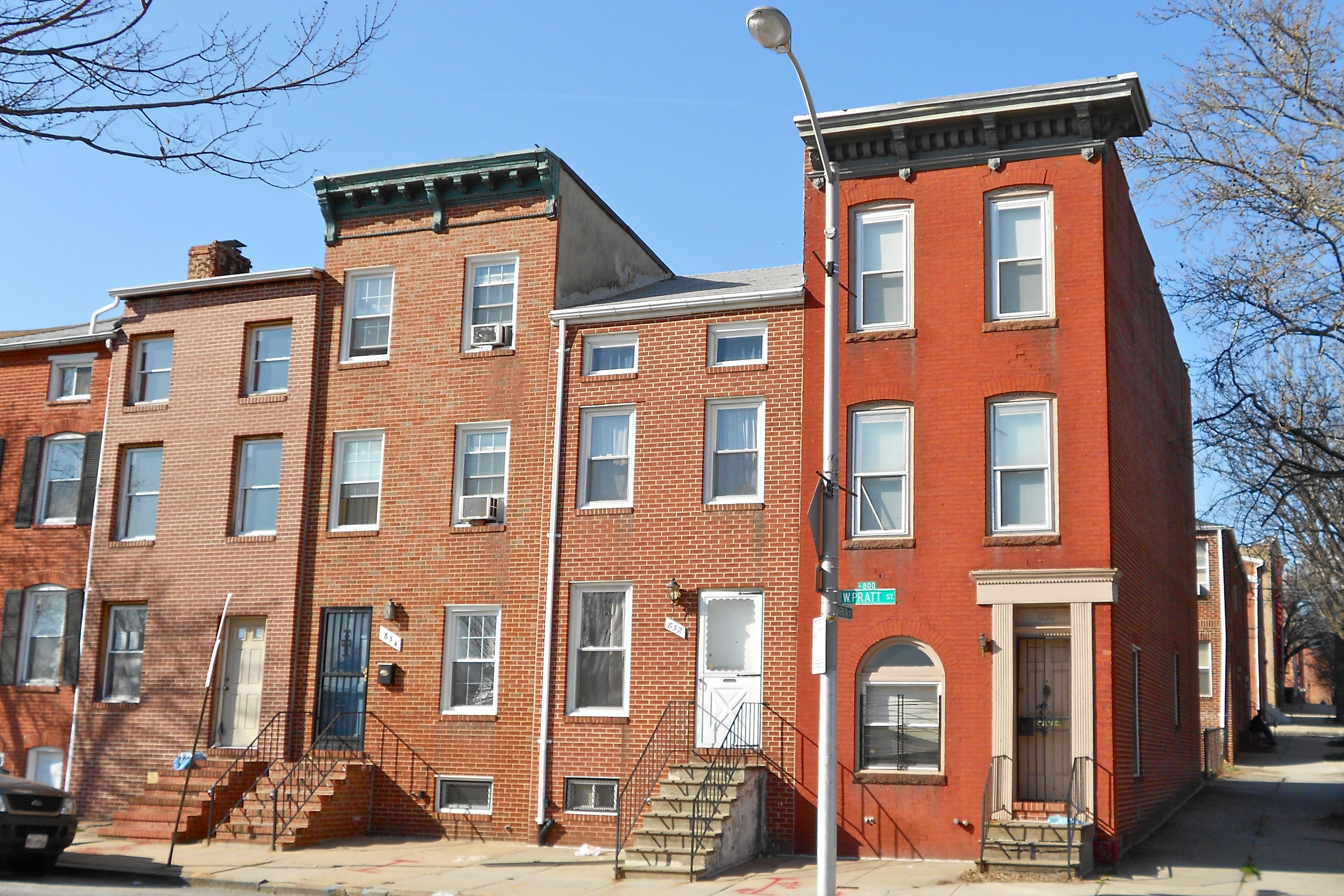
Baltimore's former Little Lithuania, Hollins-Roundhouse Historic District, March 2012.

From the 1880s to the 1920s, the Hollins-Roundhouse neighborhood became established as the center of Baltimore's Lithuanian immigrant community. Because of the large Lithuanian population in the area north of Hollins Street, the area became known as Little Lithuania. A few remnants of the neighborhood's Lithuanian heritage still remain, such as Lithuanian Hall located on Hollins Street.

== Culture ==
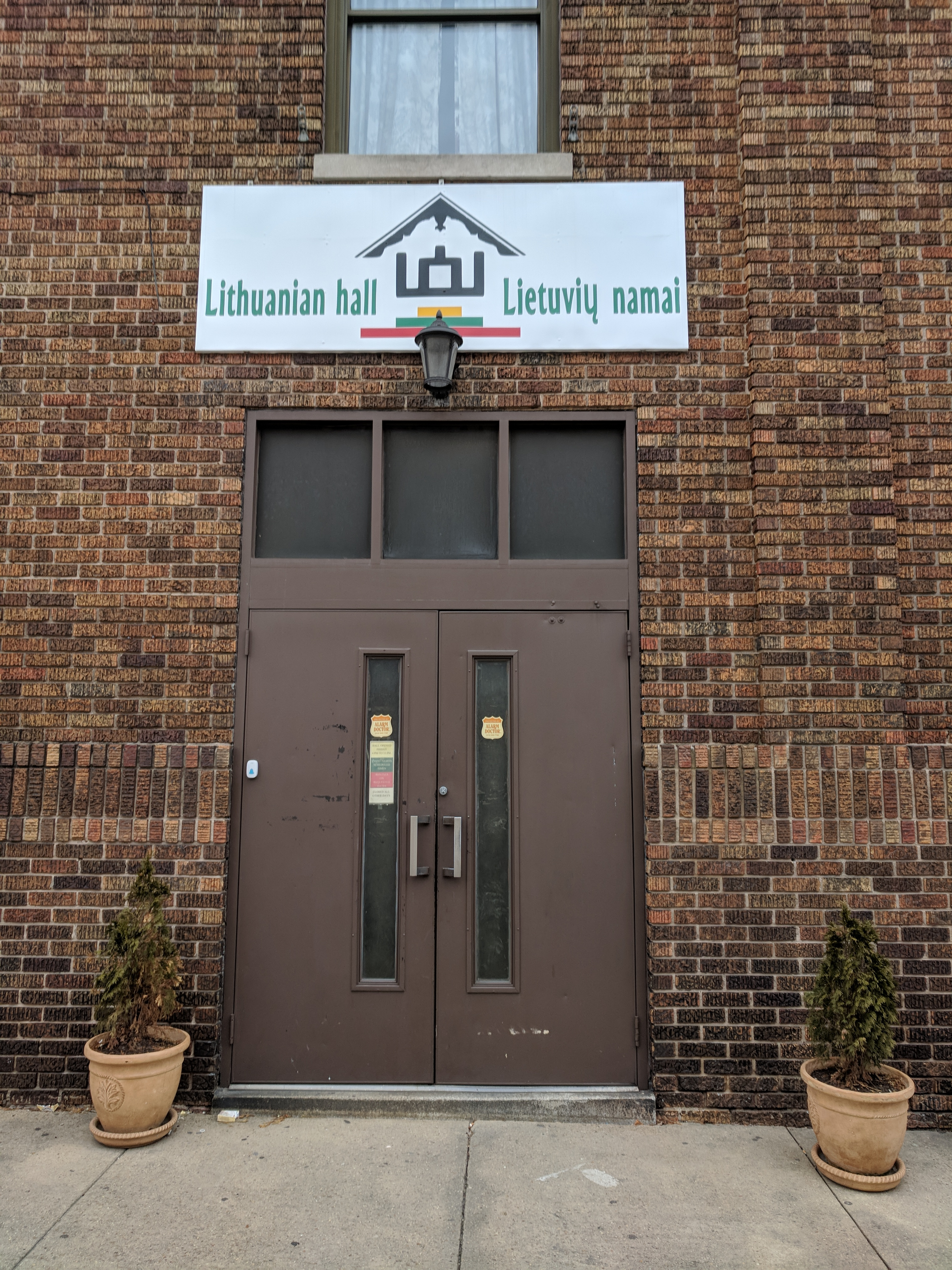
Lithuanian Hall, Hollins-Roundhouse Historic District, February 2018.

While other immigrant ethnic groups in Baltimore founded numerous ethnic building and loan associations between the 1860s and the 1910s, Lithuanians only founded one. This is because many Lithuanians shared the associations of other ethnic groups, especially those of the Polish.

An annual Lithuanian Festival is held in Catonsville in Baltimore County, not far outside city limits. The festival features Lithuanian food and drink, dances, and ethnic items.

== Notable Lithuanian-Americans from Baltimore ==
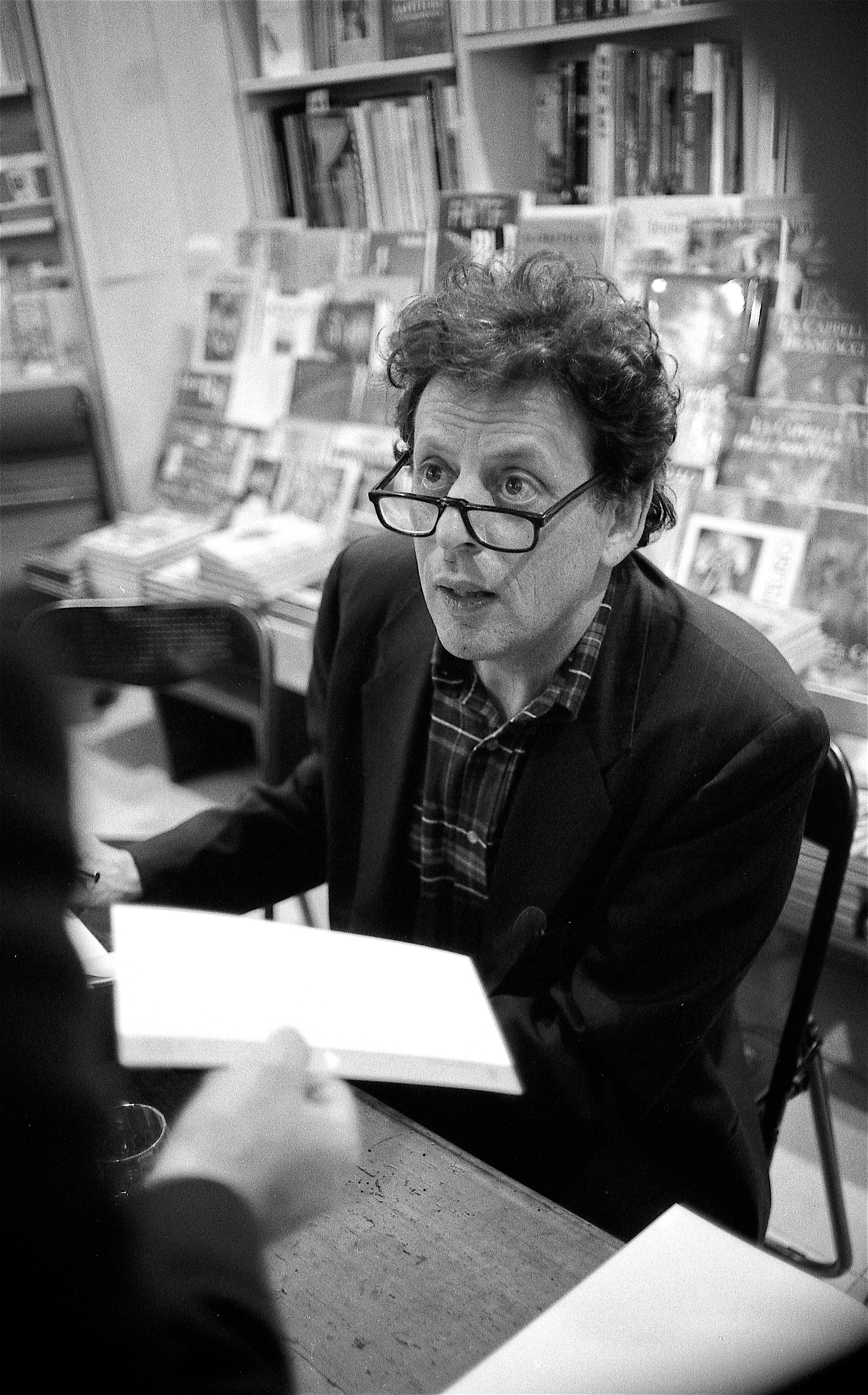
Philip Glass, an influential American composer.

- Albert Blumberg, a philosopher and political activist who was an official of the Communist Party for several years before joining the Democratic Party as a district leader.
- Philip Glass, a composer considered one of the most influential music makers of the late 20th century.
- Yaakov Kamenetsky, a prominent rosh yeshiva, posek and Talmudist.
- Yaakov Yitzchok Ruderman, a prominent Talmudic scholar and rabbi who founded and served as rosh yeshiva (yeshiva head) of Yeshiva Ner Yisroel in Baltimore.
- Eli Siegel, the poet, critic, and educator who founded Aesthetic Realism.
- Anne K. Strasdauskas, a law enforcement official who served as sheriff of Baltimore County from 1998 until 2002.
- Johnny Unitas, a professional football player who spent the majority of his career playing for the Baltimore Colts.

== See also ==
- History of the Jews in Baltimore
- History of the Russians in Baltimore
