= Hollins–Roundhouse Historic District =

Historic district in Maryland, United States

- U.S. National Register of Historic Places
- U.S. Historic district
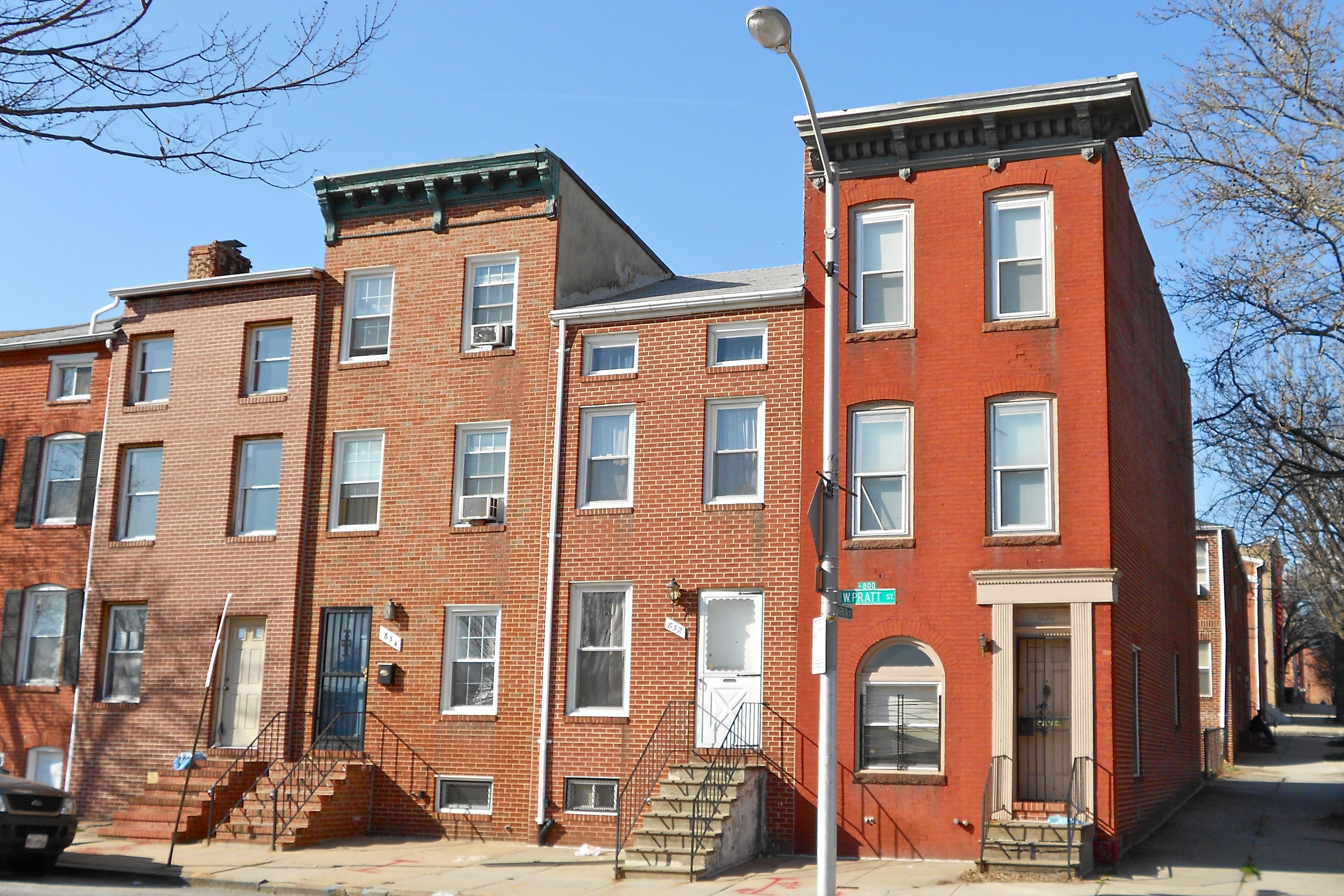
- These buildings are on the northwest corner of Pratt and Parkin Streets (a half block west of Hayes) near the Roundhouse.

- Location within Baltimore Location within Maryland Location within the United States
- Location: W. Baltimore and Schroeder Sts., south on Schroeder to Lombard; west on Lombard to Carey, south to Pratt, and east on Pratt to Hayes, Baltimore, Maryland
- Coordinates: 39°17′20″N 76°38′02″W
- Area: 50 acres (20 ha)
- Architect: Long, Robert Cary; et al.
- Architectural style: Federal, Greek Revival
- NRHP reference No.: 09000548
- Added to NRHP: July 22, 2009

Hollins–Roundhouse Historic District (also known as B-5144) is a national historic district in Baltimore, Maryland, United States. It is a primarily residential area characterized by 19th century rowhouses. The neighborhood is historically significant due to its association with the development of rail transportation in Maryland. Additional historical significance comes from the neighborhood's association with ethnic immigration to Baltimore. During the 1840s and 1850s the area was a center of settlement for Baltimore's German and Irish communities, many of whom immigrated to the United States to work in the rail industry. Later, from the 1880s to the 1920s, the neighborhood became established as the center of Baltimore's Lithuanian immigrant community. Because of the large Lithuanian population in the area north of Hollins Street, the area became known as Little Lithuania. A few remnants of the neighborhood's Lithuanian heritage still remain, such as Lithuanian Hall located on Hollins Street.

It was added to the National Register of Historic Places on July 22, 2009.

The district is "located directly north of the Baltimore & Ohio Railroad's Mount Clare yard and shops on W. Pratt Street", so apparently does not include the Mt Clare Roundhouse, now the B&O Railroad Museum, i.e. the railway roundhouse which contributes to the district's name.
