= East Monument Historic District =

Historic district in Maryland, United States

- U.S. National Register of Historic Places
- U.S. Historic district
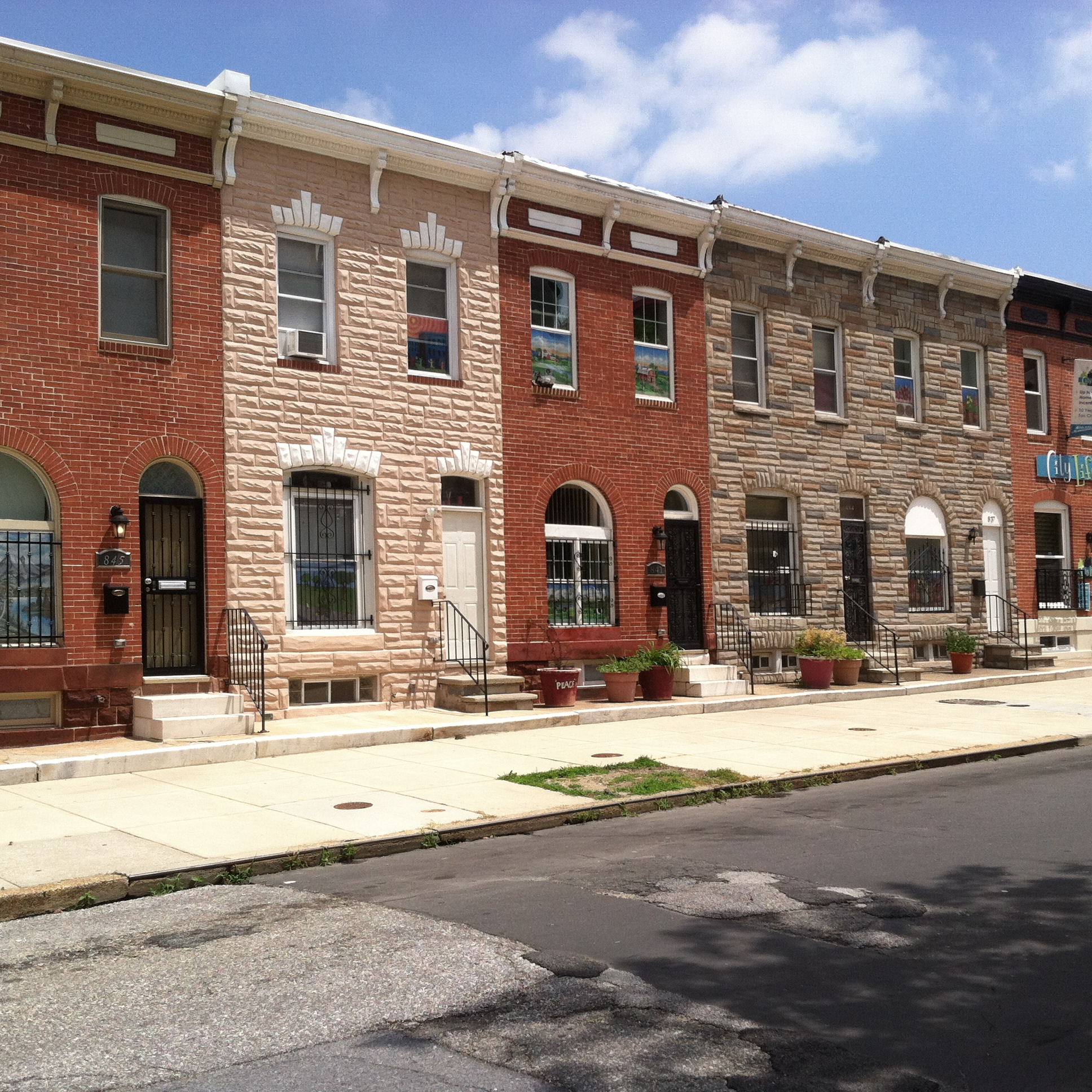
- Row homes in East Monument Historic District, June 2014.

- Location within Baltimore Location within Maryland Location within the United States
- Location: Bounded by N. Washington St. on the W; Amtrak rail line on the N. to E. St.; S. to Monument and E to Highland Ave., Baltimore, Maryland
- Coordinates: 39°18′02″N 76°34′48″W
- Area: 328 acres (133 ha)
- Architect: Novak & Hurt, Novak, Frank, et al.; Gallagher, Edward J., et al.
- Architectural style: Italianate, Queen Anne, Classical revival
- NRHP reference No.: 09001061
- Added to NRHP: December 8, 2009

East Monument Historic District (also known as B-5162) or Little Bohemia, is a national historic district in Baltimore, Maryland. It is a large residential area with a commercial strip along East Monument Street. It comprises approximately 88 whole and partial blocks. The residential area is composed primarily of rowhouses that were developed, beginning in the 1870s, as housing for Baltimore's growing Bohemian (Czech) immigrant community. During the late 19th and early 20th centuries the neighborhood was the heart of the Bohemian community in Baltimore. The Bohemian National Parish of the Roman Catholic Church, St. Wenceslaus, is located in the neighborhood. The historic district includes all of McElderry Park and Milton-Montford, most of Middle East and Madison-Eastend, and parts of Ellwood Park.

== History ==
During the late 1800s and early 1900s, the neighborhood was known colloquially as Little Bohemia or Bohemia Village. Bohemia is the historical name for the western portion of the modern day Czech Republic, and was the source of many (but not all) Czech language speaking immigrants to the area.

The folk art of screen painting is said to have originated in the neighborhood, at a produce store located at North Collington and Ashland Avenues.

By 1969, the Czech-American community in Little Bohemia was predominantly composed of aging homeowners who lived alongside more recently arrived African-American residents. According to a reporter with The Baltimore Sun, "The older people of Bohemian extraction still live in the houses they own...but they share the neighborhood with black people whom they do not seem to appreciate or understand." This was the last generation of Czech-Americans to remain in Little Bohemia in large numbers, with the neighborhood transitioning into a predominantly African-American neighborhood by the 1970s and 1980s.

The neighborhood was added to the National Register of Historic Places on December 8, 2009.

== See also ==
- History of Czechs in Baltimore
- Baltimore East/South Clifton Park Historic District
- Highlandtown, Baltimore
- Patterson Park (Neighborhood), Baltimore
