= Wenceslas Bojer =

Czech botanist (1795–1856)

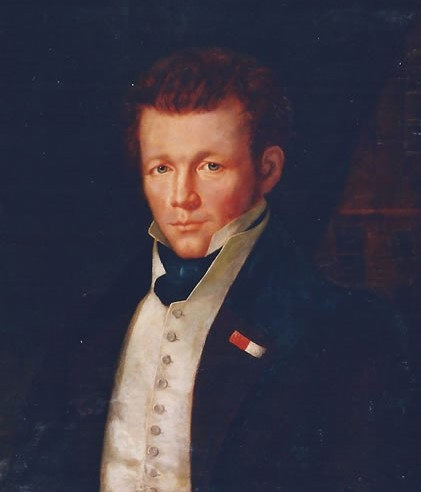
- Born: Václav Bojer; 23 September 1795; Řesanice, Bohemia
- Died: 4 July 1856 (aged 60); Port Louis, Mauritius
- Other names: Wenzel Bojer

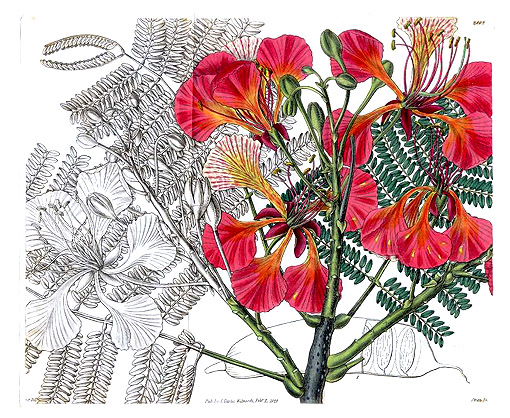
Delonix regia

Wenceslas Bojer (Czech: Václav Bojer, German: Wenzel Bojer; 23 September 1795 – 4 June 1856) was a Czech naturalist, botanist and botanical illustrator. The standard author abbreviation Bojer is used to indicate this person as the author when citing a botanical name.

== Life ==
Bojer was born on 23 September 1795 in Řesanice, Bohemia (now the Czech Republic). He was born to Simon Bojer and Barbara Staub.

== Career ==
From 1813 till 1820, Bojer worked at the Imperial Museum Vienna. As a young man he was sent on expeditions to Africa and Mauritius by Franz Sieber. In 1821 he arrived at Mauritius. The specimens that he collected were distributed by Sieber as exsiccata-like series under the titles Flora Mauritiana, Flora Mauritiana II and Flora Mauritiana Supplement. In 1822 the Mauritian governor Robert Townsend Farquhar sent him to Madagascar. He was accompanied by Malagasy Prince Rafaria who studied on Mauritius and James Hastie, a Scottish corporal and British envoy for King Radama I on Madagascar. Bojer explored the west coast of Madagascar before he arrived in Tananarive.

In 1824, Bojer was sent to Africa as an interpreter. He explored several coasts of the African continent and collected a huge amount of minerals and plants. In 1829 he was one of the co-founders of the Royal Society of Arts and Sciences (SRAS) at Mauritius.

Bojer died of paralysis on 4 June 1856 in Port Louis, Mauritius.

Many species of plants and animals (especially from Madagascar and the Mascarenes) were named after Bojer, including Gongylomorphus bojerii (Bojer's skink), Dionycha bojerii, Ploceus bojeri (golden palm weaver), Uapaca bojeri, Streptocarpus bojeri, Epilobium bojeri, and many more.

== Bibliography ==
- WorldCat
