= McElderry Park, Baltimore =

McElderry Park
- Neighborhood of Baltimore
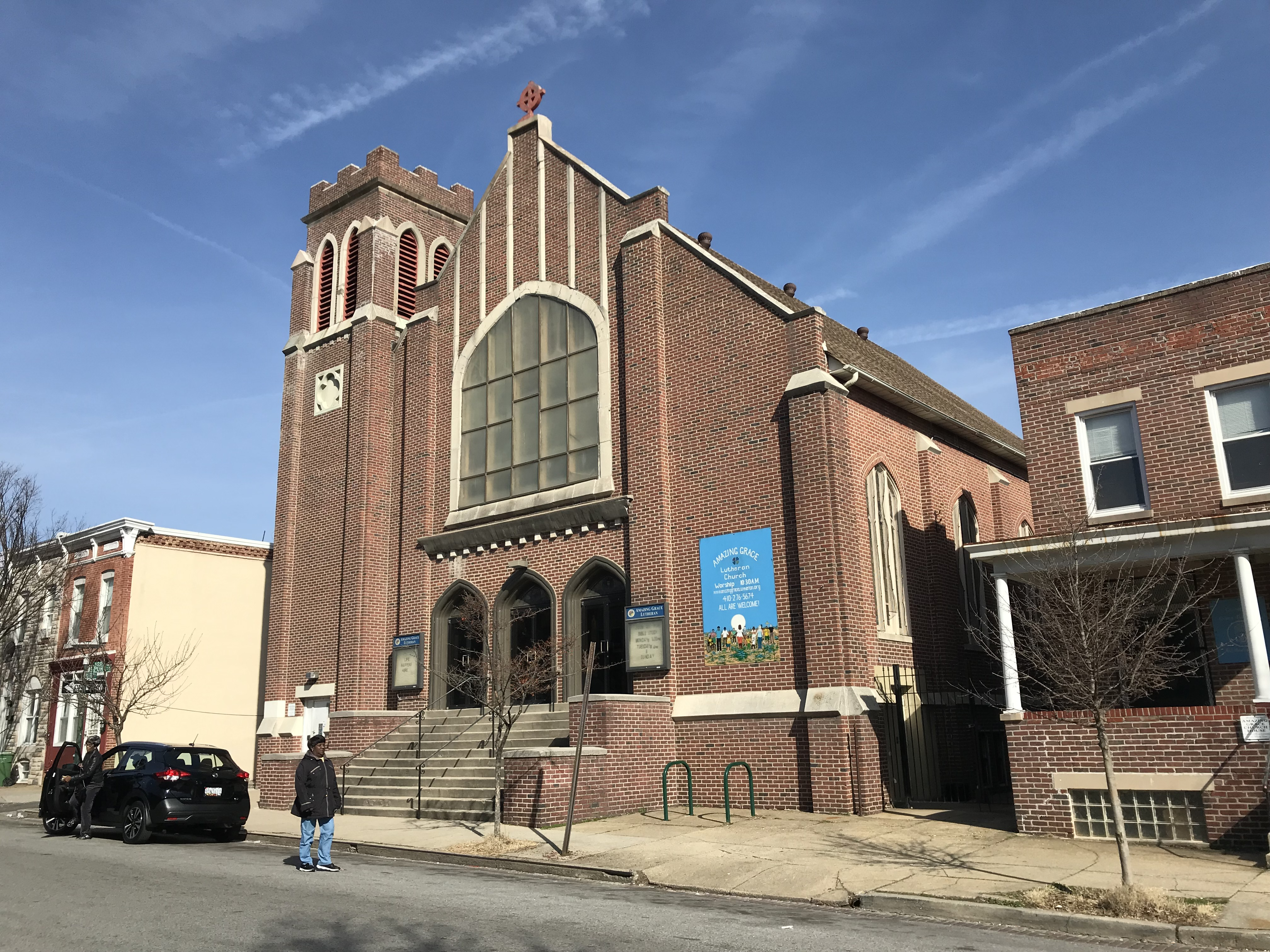
- Amazing Grace Evangelical Lutheran Church, 2424 McElderry Street

- Location within Baltimore
- Coordinates: 39.297211°N 76.581316°W
- Country: United States
- State: Maryland
- City: Baltimore

Area
  - Total: 0.161 sq mi (0.42 km^{2})
  - Land: 0.161 sq mi (0.42 km^{2})

Population (2008)
  - Total: 4,477
  - Density: 27,800/sq mi (10,700/km^{2})
- Time zone: UTC-5 (Eastern)
  - Summer (DST): UTC-4 (EDT)
- ZIP code: 21224 and 21205
- Area code: 410, 443, and 667

McElderry Park is a neighborhood in the northern part of the southeastern district of the City of Baltimore. Its boundaries are marked by East Fayette Street, East Monument Street, Linwood Avenue, and Patterson Park Avenue. South of McElderry Park is the neighborhood of Patterson Park; Butchers Hill is to the southwest. Ellwood Park is located to the east, and the campus of The Johns Hopkins Hospital to the west. To its north is the neighborhood of Madison-East End.

In the early 1980s, McElderry Park suffered from white flight and abandonment by its working class homeowners. The closing of nearby public housing flooded the neighborhood with Section 8 tenants in individual rowhouses and apartments, with additional street crime, and illegal drug trade. Throughout the 1990s, the area became the most crime-ridden in old East Baltimore. Efforts are underway to turn things around, replacing abandoned buildings with productive uses such as public gardens.

The 2000 census reported that 34.3 percent of McElderry Park's families had incomes below the poverty line. Although predominantly black, the neighborhood has significant white and Hispanic populations.

== History ==
The Park takes its name from the McElderry family, who were wealthy merchants in Baltimore in the early 19th century. Irish immigrant Thomas McElderry (1758 – 1810) arrived in Baltimore in 1793 and quickly established himself—building a wharf that bore his name, improving Market Square, and helping found the Baltimore Water Company.

McElderry Park is located entirely within the bounds of the East Monument Historic District. Historically, McElderry and the nearby neighborhood of Middle East were the heart of the Czech immigrant community in Baltimore. This area was often known as "Little Bohemia" or "Swampoodle".

== Jimmy Carter ==
Former U.S. president Jimmy Carter (served 1977–1981) assisted 300 volunteers on October 5, 2010 at a Habitat for Humanity project in McElderry Park. This week-long project restored vacant houses on the 2400 block of Jefferson Street.

"Habitat for Humanity of the Chesapeake" has been working with the Monument-McElderry-Fayette Revitalization Plan Board since 2006 on a long-term plan to restore blighted portions of McElderry Park. When they began work in 2007, only two of 43 houses in the 2400 block of Jefferson Street were occupied. The Plan Board's co-chairman expected to have 32 of the houses owner-occupied by the end of 2010.

== Amazing Port Street Sacred Commons ==
"Amazing Port Street Sacred Commons" is a prayer labyrinth, perennial garden, and open, grassy field located behind the Amazing Grace Lutheran Church (founded/merged 1996 from several earlier Lutheran churches), located at 2424 McElderry Street. The space currently used by the commons was previously occupied by abandoned, dilapidated houses. It was purchased and developed by the church as open green space with a grant from the TKF Foundation. The commons is open to the public, of all faiths, as required by the grant. Produce from the garden is distributed by the church's food pantry, the Center for Grace-full Living.

== Public services ==
=== Schools ===
- Tench Tilghman Elementary and Middle School (pre-K to 8), located at 600 North Patterson Park Avenue, enrollment 360
- William Paca Elementary School (pre-K to 5), located at 200 North Lakewood Avenue, enrollment 624

=== Enoch Pratt Free Library ===
- Patterson Park Branch Library, 158 North Linwood Avenue

=== Parks ===
- Patterson Park, one of the city's largest and oldest "green oases" between Eastern Avenue on the south, Patterson Park Avenue on the west, Ellwood Street on the east, and East Baltimore Street and East Pratt Street on the north.

=== Transportation ===
LocalLink 56 (BaltimoreLink) provides bus service between Downtown Baltimore and White Marsh, with stops along East Monument Street and East Madison Street. The QuickLink 40 (BaltimoreLink) stops at East Fayette Street and Linwood Avenue along its crosstown course between Woodlawn in the west and Essex in the east of suburban Baltimore County. CityLink Gold (BaltimoreLink) passes through the neighborhood along Milton Avenue, McElderry Street and Linwood Avenue. LocalLink 78 (BaltimoreLink) provides crosstown bus service along East Fayette Street.

== See also ==
- List of Baltimore neighborhoods
