= Patterson Park (neighborhood), Baltimore =

- Patterson Park--Highlandtown Historic District
- U.S. National Register of Historic Places
- U.S. Historic district
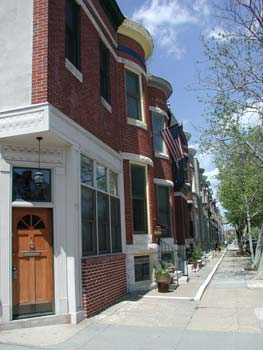
- 100 Block of North Lakewood Ave

- Location within Baltimore Location within Maryland Location within the United States
- Location: Roughly bounded by Patterson Park Ave., Orleans St., and Pulaski Hwy, Grundy St., Easter Ave., Patterson Park, Baltimore, Maryland
- Area: 295 acres (119 ha)
- Built: 1867
- Architect: Gallagher, Edward J.; et al.
- Architectural style: Late Victorian, Late 19th And 20th Century Revivals
- NRHP reference No.: 02001623
- Added to NRHP: December 27, 2002

Patterson Park is a neighborhood in Baltimore, Maryland, United States. Named for the 137-acre park that abuts its north and east sides, the neighborhood is in the southeast section of Baltimore city, roughly two miles east of Baltimore's downtown district.

Patterson Park is traditionally centered on the intersection of Baltimore Street and Linwood Avenue; until the formation of Patterson Park Neighborhood Association in 1986, it was referred to as the Baltimore-Linwood Neighborhood. Its original borders were Pratt Street to the south, Fayette Street to the north, Milton Street to the west and Clinton Street to the east, but in 2011 the neighborhood association voted to expand northward to Orleans Street between Milton and Curley Street.

Patterson Park is near the neighborhoods of Butchers Hill, Canton, Fells Point, Highlandtown, and McElderry Park.

== History ==
=== Founding ===
Patterson Park homes were first developed between the mid-19th century and early 20th century to accommodate the swelling population of Baltimore City after the Civil War.

William Patterson owned much of the land that now constitutes the Patterson Park neighborhood. In 1827, he donated five acres of land in what we now know as Patterson Park to the city for a public walk. His heirs were less interested in donating the land that remained; and instead leased the land to speculative builders, who then raised rowhouses on it. The builders sold these homes at a profit, while the Patterson heirs collected ground rent on the leased land.

Affectionately known as "marble houses," the typical Patterson Park rowhouse was built in Renaissance Revival, or Italianate, style. They have restrained flat roofs; flat, brown or red brick façades; molded and galvanized sheet-metal exterior cornices, often stamped with neoclassical decoration and dressed up with ball finials; stained glass transoms; and marble steps and trim.

In the latter half of the 19th century, immigrant European laborers as well as free blacks like Frederick Douglass flocked to Baltimore seeking jobs in the waterfront factories, rail yards and wharves. The architect-designed homes of Bolton Hill and Mount Vernon were beyond their reach, but speculative builders built block upon block of narrow rowhouses on inexpensive land, including around Patterson Park.

Architectural details changed over time, as building and manufacturing process advanced. For example, when plate glass became affordable in the late 1890s, builders replaced the tall, narrow Palladian first floor windows with a single, wide plate glass window—some arched, some square.

Three-story Victorians built circa 1900 to 1910 line the park's border. Two-story rowhouses dating from the 1920s line quaint and narrow side streets, some still paved with brick. Interiors often feature pressed tin ceilings, hardwood floors, stained glass windows and ornate moldings. Many houses still have original marble steps.

By 1927, many of the immigrants were from Bohemia, thanks to the growth of the Czech population in nearby Little Bohemia.

=== Decline ===
The exodus of middle-class—and aspiring middle-class—whites from the city center is not unique to the Patterson Park community. This is a characteristically American settlement pattern, stimulated by the advent of the electric trolley (streetcar) in 1888, and accelerated by social and economic transitions since then.

The fabric of Southeast Baltimore's working class communities was woven from the availability of good blue-collar jobs in the manufacturing industries surrounding the waterfront. Plant closures, layoffs, and the general decline of the manufacturing sector began to weaken that fabric in the 1960s.

Changes in the city's demographic composition fed fears and prejudice among residents who were suffering economic hardships. Profound social shifts arising from the civil rights movement strengthened the case for elimination of residential housing segregation, but the unintended consequence was white flight. Absentee landlords, property abandonment, predatory lending and property flipping fed the decline in Baltimore's downtown communities.

Concerted efforts by the city's political and business establishment began to focus on downtown redevelopment in the 1970s. Such efforts slowed but did not halt housing abandonment and disinvestment in Southeast Baltimore in general, and Patterson Park in particular.

The mid-1990s were a particularly difficult time for Patterson Park, as nearby public housing estates were shut down abruptly, leaving nearby residents looking for housing options. Absentee landlords in the Patterson Park neighborhood took advantage of the new transient population. The stresses further weakened the neighborhood.

=== Revitalization ===
==== Patterson Park Community Development Corporation ====
In 1996, the Patterson Park Community Development Corporation (PPCDC) was created to increase ownership rates and decrease vacancies in the area. Founder Ed Rutkowski had created the Patterson Park Neighborhood Initiative, hiring organizers to gather neighbors to define the issues affecting their neighborhoods including crime, less-than-robust city services and nuisances. Between 1996 and 2009, the PPCDC renovated about 300 Patterson Park rowhouses, many vacant. Since 1996, the area's vacancy rate declined from nearly twice that of the rest of Baltimore City to less than the average, the crime rate has dropped to less than half for violent offenses, and the average housing value has nearly tripled.

In February 2009, the collapse of the housing market led the PPCDC to file for Chapter 11 bankruptcy protection. Still, the neighborhood indicators of vacancy rate, crime rate, and housing value continue to show signs of improvement.

According to the 2010 census, Patterson Park was one of the fastest-growing areas in Baltimore, with a 19% increase in population since 2000.

=== Patterson Park Neighborhood Association ===
Founded in 1986 under the name Baltimore-Linwood Neighborhood Association and renamed to Patterson Park Neighborhood Association (PPNA) in 2003, the association is a registered 501(c)(3} non-profit organization. Founded to encourage city residents to be involved in community activities, PPNA has 300 active members. The PPNA encourages neighborliness and foster resident volunteerism. The Association holds a monthly community meeting in a local church basement, and organizes block clean-ups, tree and flower plantings, holiday parties, pot lucks, home tours and block parties.

==== Leadership ====
PPNA leadership consists of an elected board, one president, four vice presidents, one treasurer, and one secretary. The vice presidents each represent one sector of PPNA: North, South, East and West Sectors along with the more recently added Patterson Place with the dividing line of the sectors generally being S. Linwood Avenue, E. Baltimore Street, E Fayette, and S. Patterson Park Ave. Elections take place every January and every seat is voted on during elections. Officeholders must live within Patterson Park borders and be a paying PPNA member.

==== Greening Committee ====
In a partnership with the Baltimore Neighborhood Energy Challenge, the PPNA Greening Committee is working to reduce the energy consumption of Baltimore by educating and encouraging residents to pledge to reduce their household energy use through efficiency. The Greening Committee has also been awarded over $60,000 in donations to finance its project, including major support from the Chesapeake Bay Trust, a state-chartered grant maker, and Healthy Neighborhoods Inc., a local nonprofit for tree plantings in the neighborhood.

==== Alley gating ====
In 2010, PPNA has fostered gated alleys: residents gate both ends of an alley and make it a park-like space for neighbors to enjoy.

== Boundaries and population ==
Patterson Park is bounded by Baltimore Street to the north, Patterson Park Avenue to the west, Eastern Ave to the south, and Linwood Avenue to the east. As of 2010, Patterson Park was 44.3% white, 36% African American, 15.7% Hispanic, and 4% other. Because of the park's location, any north-south streets that exist on both sides of Baltimore Street have their southern parts start at Eastern Avenue instead of Baltimore, and the east-west running Pratt and Lombard Streets are also discontinuous between Patterson Park and Linwood Avenues.

== Representatives ==
=== City ===
1st District City

- Councilman Zeke Cohen

13th District City

- Councilwoman Shannon Sneed

=== State ===
46th District State Senate

- State Senator Bill Ferguson

46th District House of Delegates

- Delegate Luke Clippinger
- Delegate Robbyn Lewis
- Delegate Brooke Lierman

=== Federal ===
Maryland 3rd Congressional District

- Congressman John Sarbanes

US Senate

- Senator Chris Van Hollen
- Senator Ben Cardin

== Public services ==
=== Schools ===
- Patterson Park Public Charter School (Pre-K to 8), located at 27 N Lakewood Avenue, enrollment: 610.
- William Paca Elementary School (Pre-K to 5), located at 200 N. Lakewood Avenue, enrollment: 624.
- Highlandtown Elementary #215 (Pre-K to 8), located at 3223 East Pratt Street, enrollment: 347.

=== Library ===
- Patterson Park Branch Library, located at 158 N. Linwood Avenue

=== Transportation ===
The Route 40 Quickbus stops at Fayette Street and Linwood Avenue along its crosstown course between Woodlawn (west) and Essex (east). Route 13 passes through the neighborhood along Milton Avenue, McElderry Street and Linwood Avenue. Route 20 and Route 23 provide crosstown bus service along Fayette Street.
