= Anne K. Strasdauskas =

Sheriff of Baltimore County
- In office 1998–2002

Personal details
- Born: January 8, 1954 (age 72) Baltimore, Maryland, U.S.
- Party: Democratic
- Education: University of Wisconsin–Milwaukee (BS)
- Occupation: Corrections officer

Anne Katherine Strasdauskas (born January 8, 1954) is an American law enforcement official from the state of Maryland. A Democrat, she served as sheriff of Baltimore County, Maryland from 1998 until 2002.

== History ==
Anne Strasdauskas, of Lithuanian descent, was born as a twin sister in Baltimore, Maryland, and was raised in the Baltimore section of Highlandtown. Strasdauskas graduated from the University of Wisconsin–Milwaukee with a 3.8 GPA with a B.S. in education (specializing in Physical Education) and a A.A. degree in Health. Strasdauskas was a backup speedskater to the U.S. Olympic Team. She spent several winters in the Netherlands skating with the Dutch national B Team.

Strasdauskas first worked for Baltimore County Government with the Baltimore County Jail as a Corrections Officer. She was hired by then Sheriff James E. Malone, Sr. By 1990, Strasdauskas made the move to become a Baltimore County Deputy Sheriff. She graduated from the Baltimore County Police Academy. Strasdauskas was a Deputy Sheriff in the Field Operations Bureau until 1994.

Strasdauskas was terminated by then Sheriff Norman M. Pepersack, Jr. in February 1998. Her infraction was not getting a non-emergency channel programmed on her radio during a vacation trip. Strasdauskas decided to run for Sheriff while filling an appeal, and filed on the deadline July 7, 1998. She ran in the Democratic primary with very little money, no name recognition, and help. Handmade signs and close friends helped her win the primary. Now she faced her old boss in the 1998 General Election.

Strasdauskas was placed on the Democratic Unity Ballot with such names as Dutch Ruppersberger, Ben Cardin, Parris Glendening, and others. She received enough campaign contributions to have professionally made campaign signs made with her slogan, "Fair, Firm, Impartial". The 1998 General Election proved to be a landslide for the Democrats, and Strasdauskas beat Pepersack by less than 6,500 votes. She also received help from Kathleen Kennedy, the daughter of Robert Kennedy, and now a close personal friend, who she has always given credit to.

== The Sheriff ==
Under her stewardship, the Baltimore County Sheriff's Office attained a 20-year retirement plan, newer office equipment, upgrade in firearms, higher training standards, new security scanners, and after September 11, 2001, a new camera observation system was ordered, and was to be installed the following year. She also kept the budget flat lined with no increases in cost to tax payers.

== Electoral defeat ==
Leading up to the primary election in 2002, Strasdauskas faced only a handful of opponents. Charles Cuddy, a Baltimore County Dispatcher, and R. Jay Fisher, a Lieutenant with the Baltimore Police Department. Strasdauskas lost to Fisher by approximately 12,000 votes.

== Aftermath ==
Strasdauskas went back to work for private security. In 2005, she became a Correctional Officer for the Cecil County Sheriff's Office. Strasdauskas later resigned from the Cecil County Sheriff's Office in late 2011 due to allegations of supplying cellular telephones to prison inmates. She also supported Chris Sutton, an opponent of incumbent Sheriff, it is believed that allegations were related to this.

On June 18, 2014, Strasdauskas placed a letter to the editor in the Cecil Whig stating her affiliation with and the endorsement of Chris Sutton by Cecil County Correctional Officers Association. It was later stated the association is actually dormant and she is not employed with the correctional institution.
