= Screen painting =

Early 20th century art form

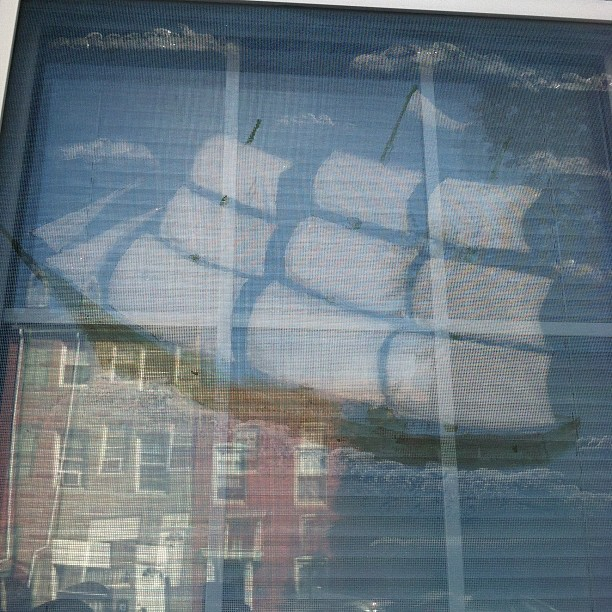
A window screen in Baltimore painted with a ship.

Screen painting is painting on window screens. It is a folk art form originating in immigrant working-class neighborhoods in Baltimore, Maryland, in the early 20th century.

The wire screen section of a screen door is typically painted with bucolic landscapes, still lifes, or other subjects of interest. The artist paints the scene directly onto the screen, making sure to remove excess paint from the screen's holes so the screen retains its ability to ventilate. The scene painted on the screen prevents the eye from focusing past the image, giving residents privacy without limiting their ability to look outside. While screen painting is now mostly regarded as urban kitsch, authentic examples can still be seen in Baltimore neighborhoods such as Hampden or Highlandtown.

== History ==
Screen painting was invented by the Czech immigrant William Oktavec to restrict the sunlight entering his produce store. He had studied commercial art and drawing before opening his Baltimore shop. The technique was later taken up in other neighborhoods by other artists.

It is estimated that as many as 100,000 painted screens in Baltimore once adorned the rowhouses. As of 2014 there were only 1,000 screen paintings left.

The American Visionary Art Museum features a permanent exhibition on screen paintings, including a re-creation of a row house and a documentary titled "The Screen Painters" made by folklorist Elaine Eff.

== See also ==
- Johnny Eck, a screen painter
- William Oktavec, the inventor of screen painting
