= St. Wenceslaus Catholic Church (Baltimore) =

Church in Maryland, US

Coordinates: 39.300278°N 76.586944°W

St. Wenceslaus Church
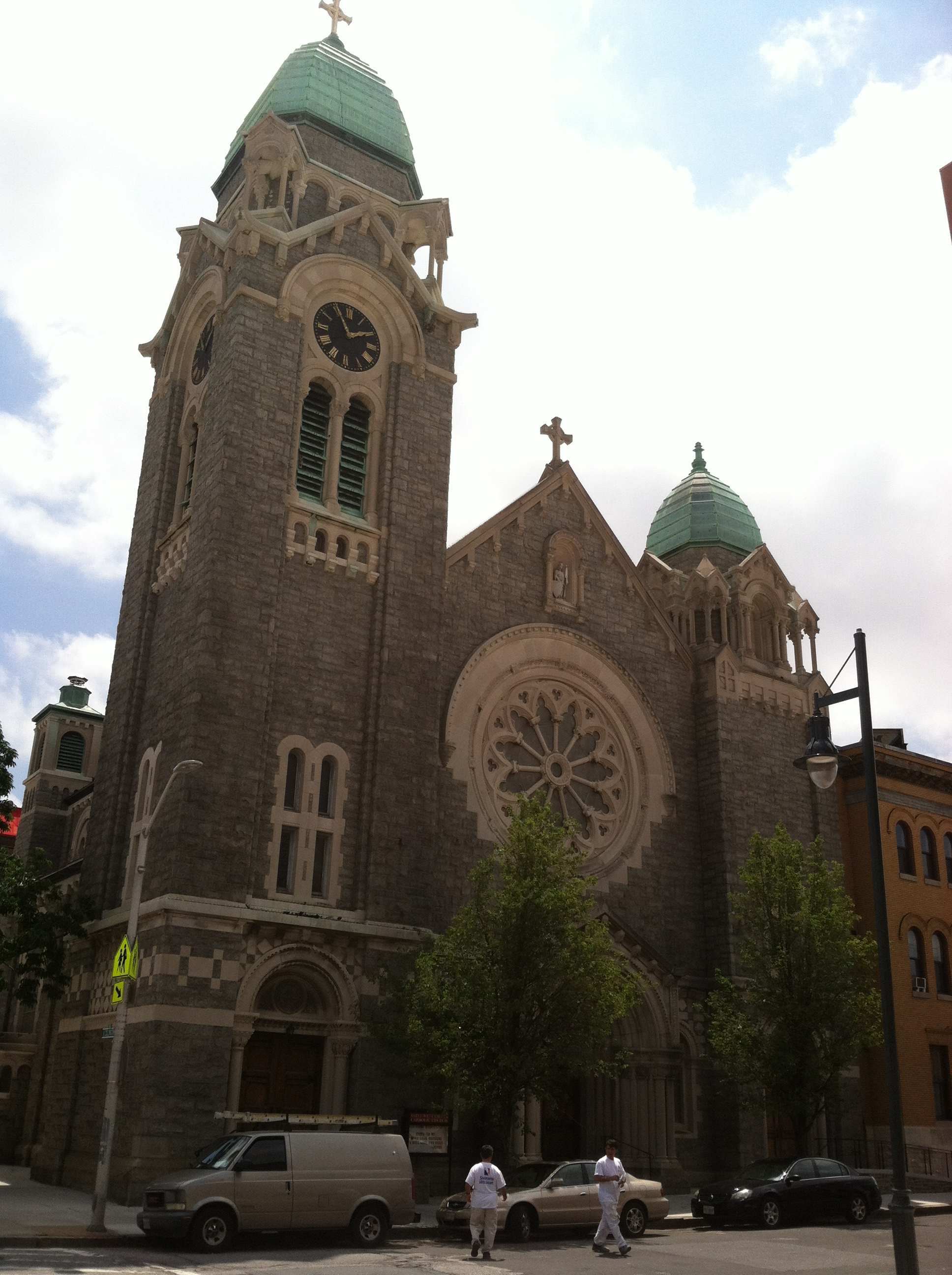
- St. Wenceslaus Church, 2014.

- Location: 2111 Ashland Ave., Baltimore
- Country: United States
- Denomination: Roman Catholic
- Website: St. Wenceslaus Catholic Church

History
- Founded: November 1872
- Founder: Bohemian immigrants
- Dedication: St. Wenceslaus

Architecture
- Functional status: Active
- Heritage designation: For Bohemian immigrants
- Architectural type: Church
- Style: Italianate
- Groundbreaking: 1914
- Completed: 1914

Specifications
- Materials: Granite

Clergy
- Pastor(s): Fr Xavier Edet, SSJ

St. Wenceslaus Catholic Church (Czech: Kostel sv. Václava) is a Catholic parish church of the Archdiocese of Baltimore located in the Middle East neighborhood of Baltimore, Maryland. It is administered by the Josephites and serves a primarily African-American congregation.

== History ==
St. Wenceslaus was founded in 1872 in a neighborhood of East Baltimore that was then known as Little Bohemia. The parish was created primarily to serve the Bohemian (Czech) community in Baltimore. As suggested by parish records (which begin around May 1872), a significant number of early attendees came from South Bohemia around Milevsko, as well as the Plzeň Region south of Nepomuk (especially Pačejov and Myslív). Also attending included Slovaks, especially from the parish of Studienka (also known as Szentistván), Švábovce (including Hôrka and Ondrej (also known as Szent-András)), Lakšárska Nová Ves (including Mikulášov, also known as Niklhof), and Horné Orešany (also known as Felsődiós). Church services were originally held in both the English and Czech languages.

The present church was built in 1914, and at that time the church had 7,000 Bohemian Catholic members. By 1920 the church was the fourth largest in the Archdiocese of Baltimore.

In recent years, the ethnic character of St. Wenceslaus parish has undergone a gradual change from a majority Czech parish to one that is multicultural and multiracial, first as many Poles and Lithuanians moved into the neighborhood, and then as the neighborhood shifted to having an African-American majority. Since 2018, St. Wenceslaus has been administered by the Josephites, a congregation that serves African-Americans.

St. Wenceslaus was founded and staffed by priests and lay brothers of the Congregation of the Most Holy Redeemer, known as the Redemptorists, until 1999. Later, it was administered by friars of the Franciscan Third Order Regular, and as of 2022 is under the leadership of the Josephites.

== Architecture ==
The building's overall design is in the Italianate style.

== Notable attendees ==
- John Fick, baseball player
- August Klecka, politician

== Parish records online ==
Births and baptisms 1872-1892 (with additional information back to 1868)

Marriages 1872-1978

Deaths and burials 1880-1979

== See also ==
- Black Catholicism
- History of the Czechs in Baltimore
- Catholicism in the Czech Republic
