= Ellwood Park, Baltimore =

Ellwood Park
- Neighborhood of Baltimore
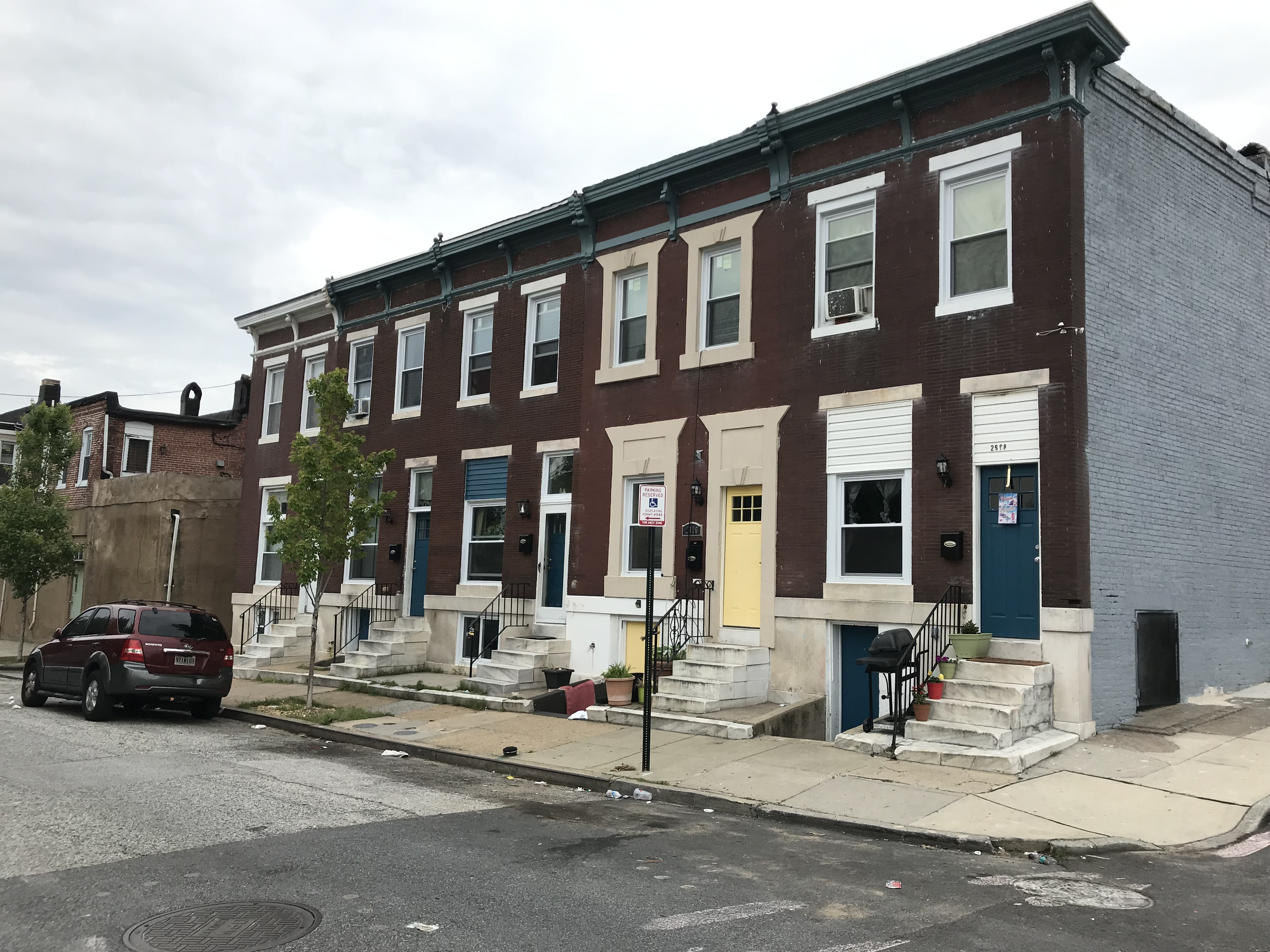
- Rowhouses on the 2900 block of Pulaski Highway in Ellwood Park, Baltimore

- Location within Baltimore
- Coordinates: 39°17′49.56″N 76°34′24.24″W
- Country: United States
- State: Maryland
- City: Baltimore
- Time zone: UTC-5 (Eastern)
  - Summer (DST): EDT
- ZIP code: 21205/21224
- Area code: 410, 443, and 667

Ellwood Park is a neighborhood in the eastern part of Baltimore, Maryland. It is named for a small public park with a playground between Jefferson and Orleans Streets. The neighborhood extends from Linwood Avenue and Haven Street, between Monument Street and Fayette Street. It is contained within the 21205 and 21224 zip code.

Architecturally, Ellwood Park is made up of rowhouses constructed in the early 20th century. Most have front porches and the white marble steps. It is a community of mostly middle class to low-income residents. Neighborhood groups include the Ellwood Park Improvement Association and Family of Ellwood Park Community Association.

== Demographics ==
As of the census of 2010, there were 5,790 people living in the neighborhood. The racial makeup was 63.9% African American, 20% Hispanic, 9.6% white, 5.3% Asian, and 1% other. 61.6% of housing units were owner-occupied. 20.6% of housing units were vacant.

== Crime and urban blight ==
The northern part of Ellwood Park is one of the most dangerous parts of Baltimore, as based upon call volume to police and reports made. Seven percent of Ellwood Park homes are vacant. Nearly 30 percent of school aged children are chronically absent. Home ownership hovers at around 30% of the properties in the area.
