= Biddle Street, Baltimore =

Neighborhood in Baltimore

Biddle Street
- Neighborhood of Baltimore
- Location within Baltimore Location within Maryland Location within the United States
- Coordinates: 39°18′13″N 76°34′47″W
- Country: United States
- State: Maryland
- City: Baltimore
- Time zone: UTC−5 (Eastern)
  - Summer (DST): UTC−4 (EDT)
- Area Codes: 410, 443, 667

Biddle Street is a neighborhood in east Baltimore, Maryland, United States.
