= Einspruch =

Einspruch is a surname. Notable people with the surname include:

- Franklin Einspruch (born 1968), American artist and writer
- Henry Einspruch (1892–1977), Galician-born Lutheran missionary and author
- Norman Einspruch (born 1931/32), American professor and dean

== See also ==
- Plötzlich Papa – Einspruch abgelehnt!, a German television series
