= History of Poles in Baltimore =

The history of Poles in Baltimore dates back to the late 19th century. The Polish community is largely centered in the neighborhoods of Canton, Fell's Point, Locust Point, and Highlandtown. Poles are the largest Slavic ethnic group in the city and one of the largest European ethnic groups.

== Demographics ==
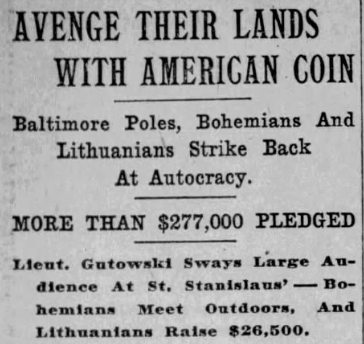
An April 22, 1918, article in the Baltimore Sun about Bohemians, Lithuanians, and Polish people in Baltimore engaging in fundraising for liberty bonds.

In 1880, Poles made up a small portion of the foreign-born population of Baltimore at 1% of all foreign born residents. 16.9% (56,354) of Baltimore was foreign born, 563 of them Polish.

In 1920, 11,083 foreign-born White people in Baltimore spoke the Polish language as their mother tongue, making Polish the most widely spoken Slavic or Baltic mother tongue among the city's immigrants.

In 1940, approximately 34,000 Polish-Americans lived in the state of Maryland, most of them in Baltimore. In the same year, 8,862 immigrants from Poland lived in Baltimore. These immigrants comprised 14.2% of the city's foreign-born white population. In total, 21,175 people of Polish birth or descent lived in the city, comprising 15.2% of the foreign-stock white population.

The Polish community in the Baltimore metropolitan area numbered 122,814 as of 2000, making up 4.8 percent of the area's population. In the same year Baltimore city's Polish population was 18,400, 2.8% of the city's population.

As of 2011, immigrants from Poland were the eighteenth largest foreign-born population in Baltimore and the Polish language was the eleventh most commonly spoken language among people who spoke English "less than very well".

In 2013, an estimated 15,828 Polish-Americans resided in Baltimore city, 2.5% of the population.

== History ==
=== 19th century ===
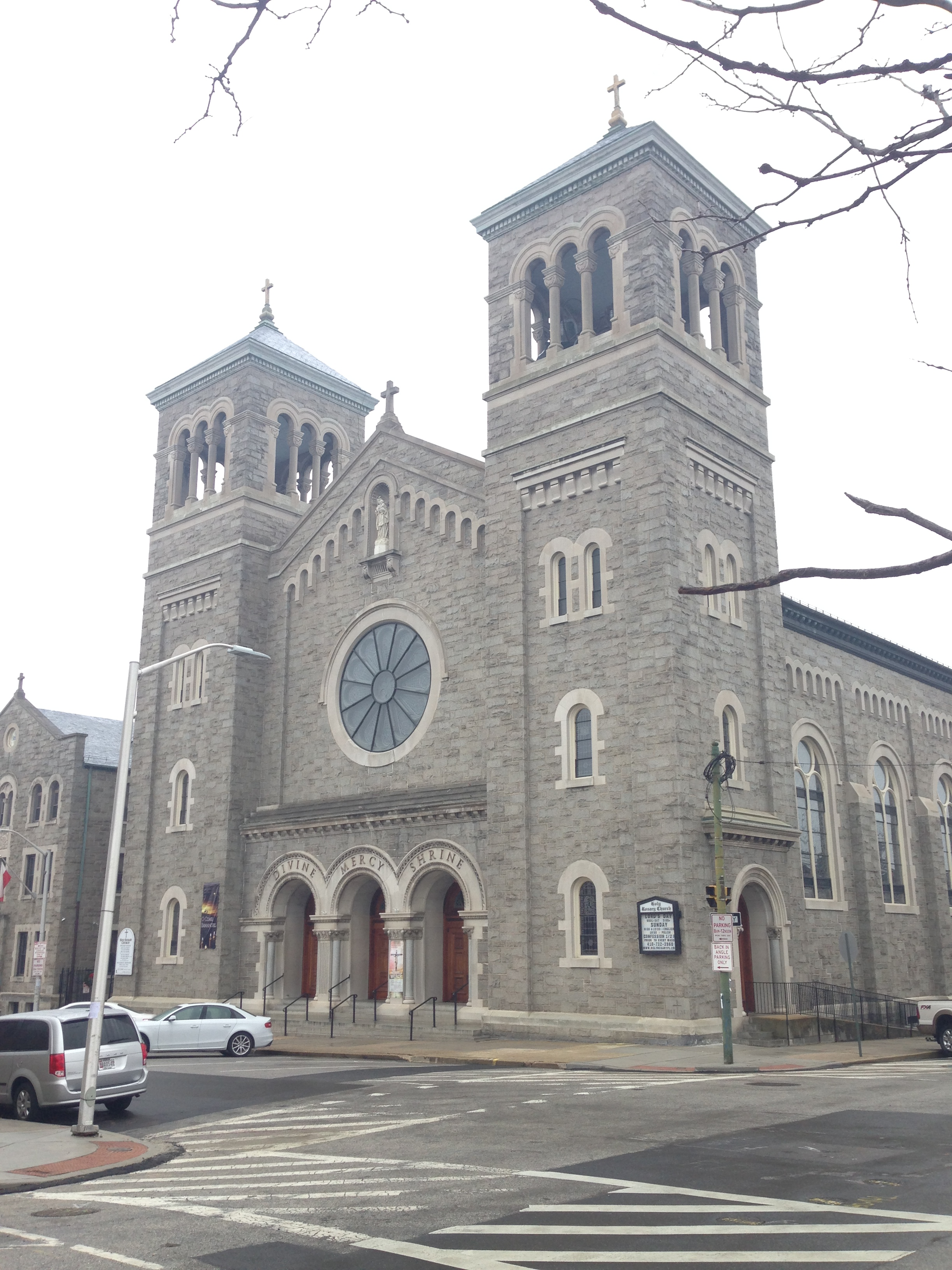
Holy Rosary Church in Upper Fell's Point, January 2016.

The first Polish immigrants to Baltimore settled in the Fell's Point neighborhood in 1868. Polish mass immigration to Baltimore and other U.S. cities first started around 1870, many of whom were fleeing the Franco-Prussian War. Many Polish immigrants came from agricultural regions of Poland and were often considered unskilled workers. Many worked as stevedores for Baltimore's International Longshoremen's Association. Other Polish immigrants worked in the canneries, some travelling to the Gulf Coast of Louisiana and Mississippi to work in the seafood canneries during the winter months. After the abolition of slavery, farmers had lost their slaves and wanted a cheap source of labor. Following changes in U.S. immigration laws many Central and Eastern European migrants, particularly Polish and Czech, came to Maryland to fill this need. These changes also affected other nations.

The majority of Polish immigrants were Roman Catholics. The first Polish-Catholic parish to be formed was the St. Stanislaus Kostka church, which was organized in 1880. The Holy Rosary Church parish was founded in 1887. However, many were Polish Jews. Polish Jews helped found the B'nai Israel Synagogue in 1873.

The first Polish language newspaper in Baltimore, titled Polonia, began publication in 1891.

By 1893, the Polish population was starting to become the backbone of Baltimore's laboring class. 1,500 were arriving in Baltimore annually and by 1893 there were 23,000 Polish-Americans living in the city.

=== 20th century ===
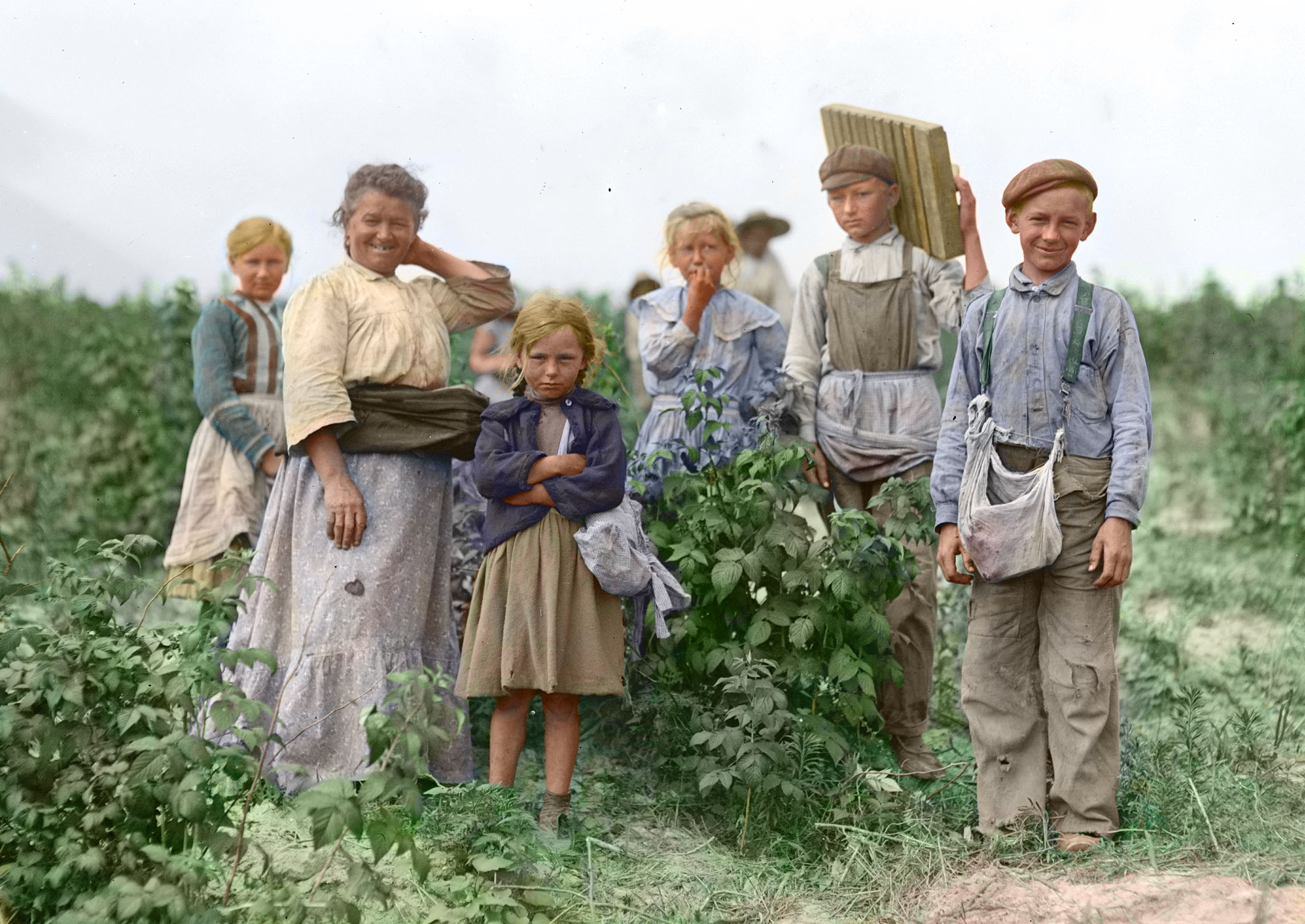
Polish migrant berry pickers in Baltimore, 1909.

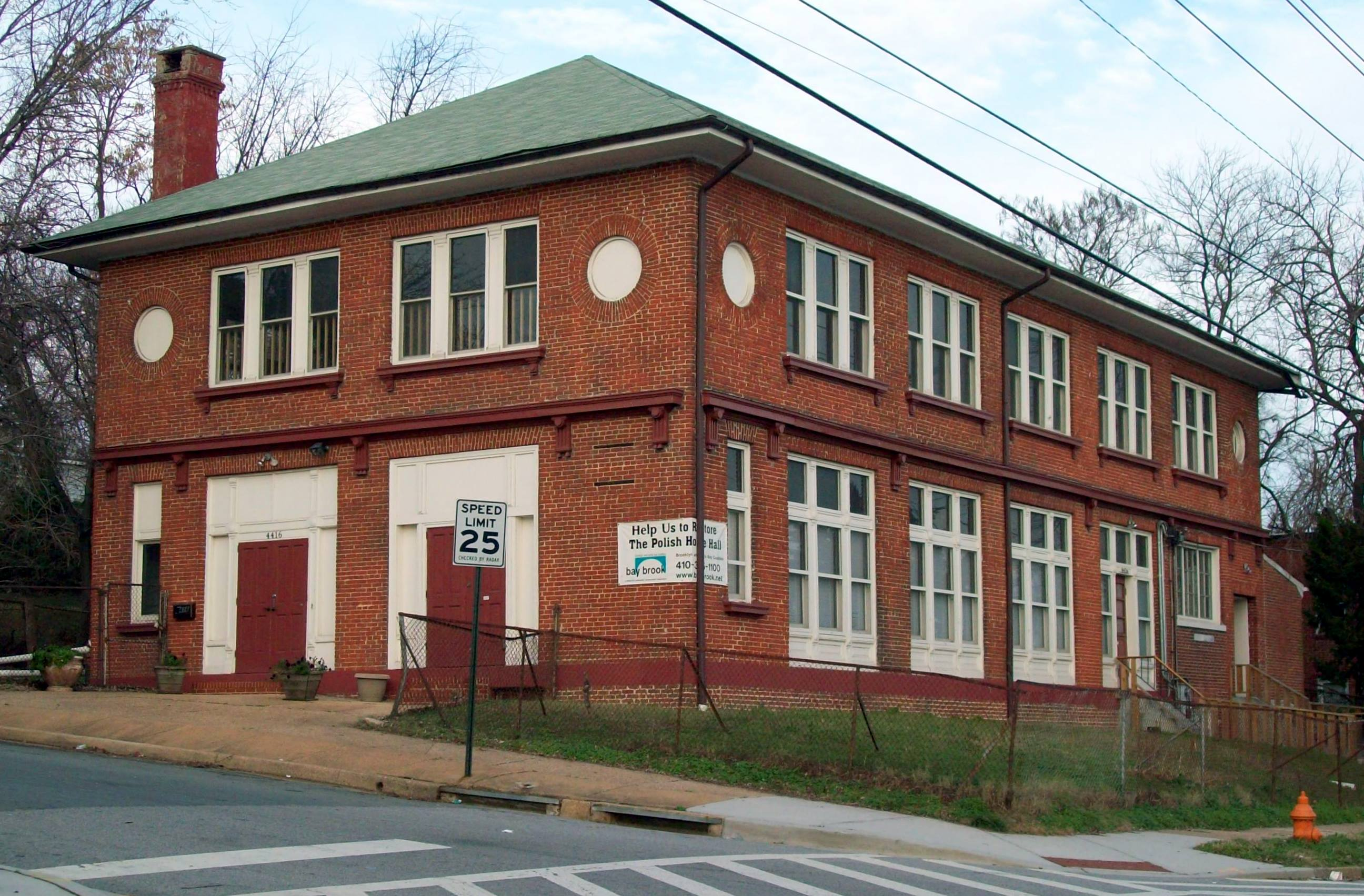
Polish Home Hall in Curtis Bay, December 2011.

The St. Casimir Church parish was established in 1902. St. Casimir's current building was constructed in 1927. Less than a year later, Holy Rosary Church built its current residence.

During the early years of the 20th century the Polish population became more established in Baltimore. The Polish community established ethnic clubs, Polish-language newspapers, and create their own savings and loans societies. By 1910, Eastern Avenue in Baltimore was known as the Polish Wall Street of Baltimore.

In the years prior to World War I, the Polish population in Baltimore ranked seventh largest in the United States.

Baltimore's Poles first gained political representation in 1923, when Edward I. Novak was elected to the Baltimore City Council for the city's 3rd ward.

In 1925, the Polish community of Curtis Bay established the Polish Home Hall in order to serve as a community center for the Polish community.

In the census of 1960, Polish-Americans comprised 15.2% of Baltimore's population. The Polish-born was a percentage of the total foreign-born population was 62.6% in Fell's Point, 38.5% in Locust Point, and 74.7% in Southeast Baltimore.

Ze Mean Bean Café in Fell's Point opened in 1995. It is a restaurant which offers Polish cuisine, as well as other Slavic and Eastern European fare.

In 2000, Baltimore's Polish community funded the creation of the National Katyń Memorial at Inner Harbor East. The monument is meant to memorialize the victims of the Katyn massacre.

=== 21st century ===
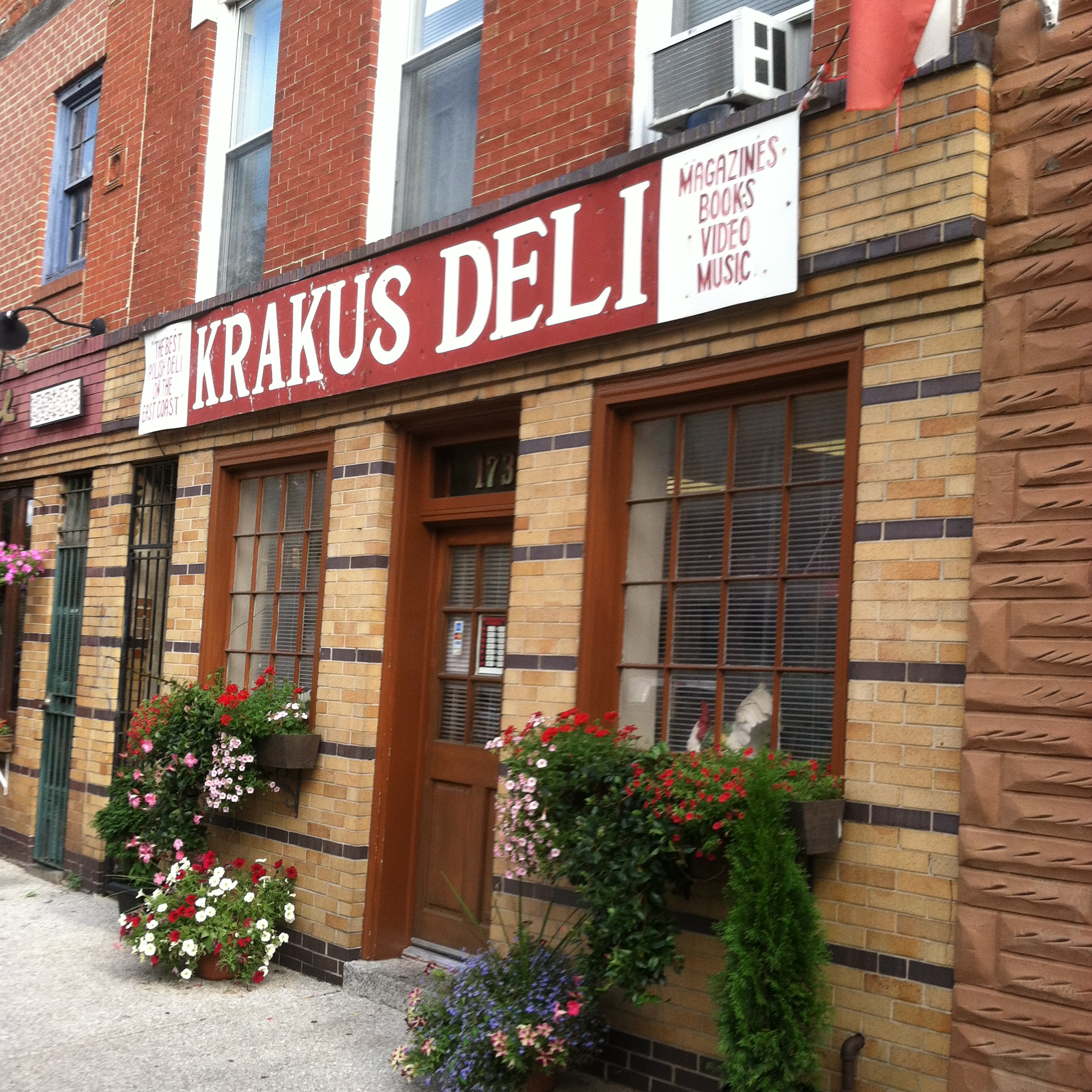
Krakus Polish Deli in Fell's Point, June 2014.

The Polish community has declined in numbers over the years, but there is still a strong Polish presence. The Polish National Alliance is located in Baltimore and maintains an archive of several thousand documents in the Polish language. There are a number of Polish delis and restaurants still in operation, such as Krakus Deli, Polock Johnny's, Ostrowski of Bank Street, and Ze Mean Bean Café.

In 2011, Baltimore's long-running Polish festival left Baltimore after 37 years of being held there; the festival was relocated to Lutherville-Timonium. According to The Baltimore Sun, the move was due to the shrinking size of the Polish community in Baltimore. The organizers of the annual Polish festival in Baltimore, The Polish Community Association of Maryland (PCAM), provide an alternate reason for moving the festival out of the city: the city sharply increased fees for space rental and services, and mandated expensive insurance coverages be provided by the organizers.

The National Slavic Museum opened in 2012. The museum focuses on the Slavic history of Baltimore, including Baltimore's Polish history.

The Lemko House, an apartment complex on South Ann Street, provides housing for Eastern European immigrants. Founded in 1983 by Ivan Dornic, an Eastern Rite priest, the complex is named after Dornic's ethnic group, the Lemkos. The Lemkos are a Rusyn ethnic group inhabiting Lemkivshchyna, a part of Transcarpathia that spans parts of Slovakia, Poland, and Ukraine. Lemko House has opened its doors to low-income residents of any ethnicity, but is still home to many Slavic and Eastern European immigrants.

== Little Poland ==
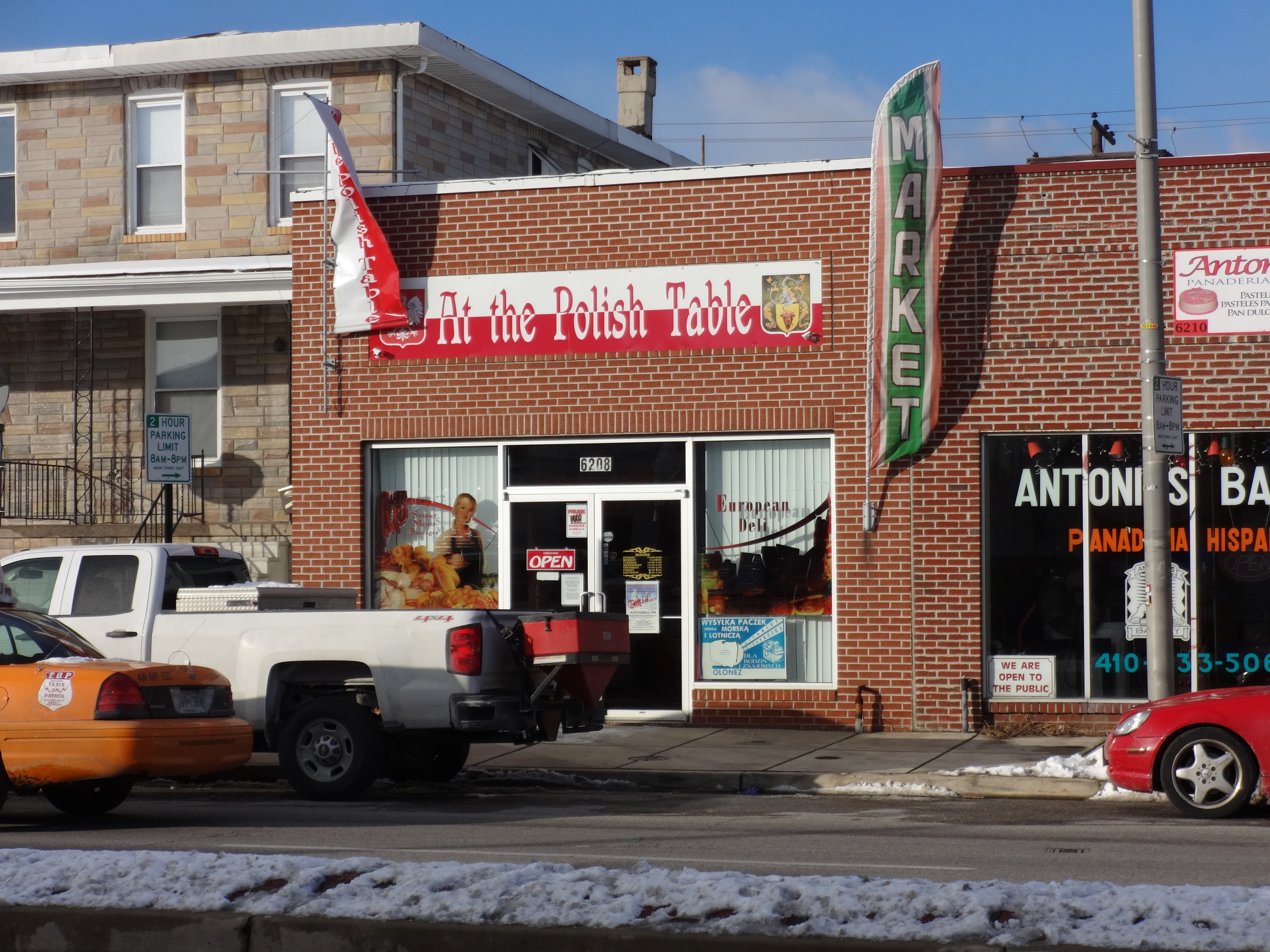
At the Polish Table in Joseph Lee, Baltimore, January, 2015.

The Polish community in Southeast Baltimore is sometimes referred to affectionately as Little Poland.

== Notable Polish-Americans from Baltimore ==
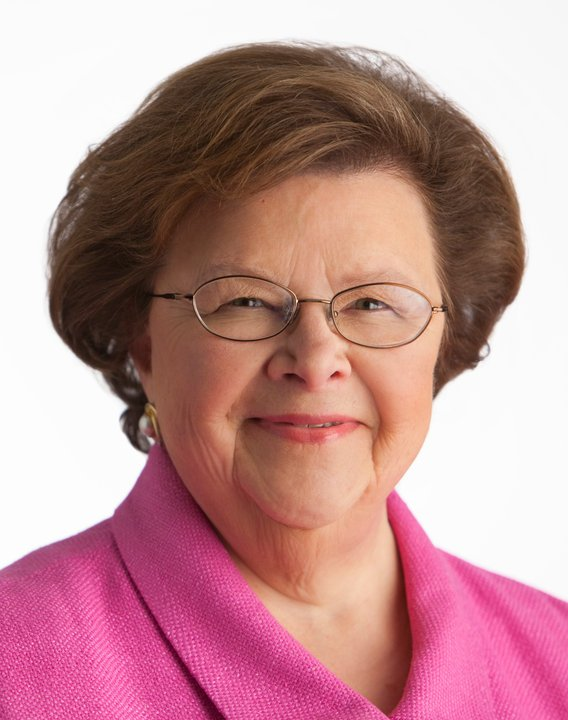
Barbara Mikulski, the senior United States senator from Maryland, a former United States Representative, the longest-serving female senator, and the longest-serving woman in the history of the U.S. Congress.

- Rafael Alvarez, an author based in Baltimore and Los Angeles.
- Cecylia Barczyk, a Polish-born cellist.
- Mike Bielecki, a former professional baseball player who pitched in the Major Leagues for five different teams.
- Dick Bielski, a former professional American football player and coach
- Kendel Ehrlich, former First Lady of Maryland, having served from 2003 to 2007 during the administration of Maryland Gov. Robert Ehrlich.
- Henry Einspruch, a Polish-born Messianic missionary affiliated with the Hebrew-Christian movement who translated the Christian New Testament into Yiddish.
- Rabbi Aharon Feldman, an Orthodox Jewish Rabbi and Rosh Yeshiva (dean) of Yeshivas Ner Yisroel (Ner Israel Rabbinical College) in Baltimore.
- Philip H. Goodman, 42nd Mayor of the City of Baltimore and a member of the Maryland Senate.
- Rabbi Arthur Hertzberg, a Conservative rabbi and prominent Jewish-American scholar and activist.
- Hank Kazmierski, a retired American soccer forward.
- Greg Kihn, a rock musician, radio personality, and novelist.
- Carolyn J. Krysiak, a politician who represented the 46th legislative district in the Maryland House of Delegates.
- Bernie Miklasz, an American sportswriter and sports radio personality in St. Louis, Missouri.
- Barbara Mikulski, the senior United States senator from Maryland and a member of the Democratic Party, serving since 1987.
- Ric Ocasek, a musician and music producer best known as lead vocalist for the rock band The Cars.
- Joseph C. Palczynski, a spree killer in the suburbs of Baltimore who terrorized residents in March 2000.
- William Rosenau, a leader of Reform Judaism in the beginning of the twentieth century in the United States.
- Carroll Rosenbloom, a businessman who was owner of the Baltimore Colts and the Los Angeles Rams.
- Edward Rowny, a U.S. Army general and an ambassador.
- Mitchell T. Rozanski, a prelate of the Roman Catholic Church serving as the Archbishop of the Archdiocese of St.Louis, Mo.
- Maggie Sajak, a country singer.
- Leon Uris, a novelist known for his historical fiction.
- Albert Warner, a Polish-born Jewish-American film executive who was one of the founders of Warner Bros. Studios.
- Harry Warner, a Polish-born Jewish-American studio executive, one of the founders of Warner Bros., and a major contributor to the development of the film industry.
- Jack L. Warner, a Canadian-born Jewish-American film executive who was the president and driving force behind the Warner Bros. Studios.
- Sam Warner, a Polish-born Jewish-American film producer who was the co-founder and chief executive officer of Warner Bros. Studios.
- Carolyn Wasilewski, a 14-year-old victim of an unsolved murder that made national headlines.
- Leo Wolman, a noted economist whose work focused on labor economics.

=== Fictional Polish-Americans from Baltimore ===
Several Polish-American characters played major roles in the television series The Wire. Among them, the most important were:

- Roland Pryzbylewski
- Frank Sobotka
- Nick Sobotka
- Ziggy Sobotka
- Stan Valchek

== See also ==
- Ethnic groups in Baltimore
- History of Baltimore
