= St. Casimir Church, Baltimore =

Coordinates: 39.280086°N 76.577217°W

St. Casimir Church
- Location: 2736 O'Donnell Street, Baltimore, Maryland
- Country: United States
- Denomination: Roman Catholic
- Website: St. Casimir Church

History
- Founded: November 9, 1902
- Founder: James Cardinal Gibbons
- Dedicated: 1926

Architecture
- Functional status: Active
- Heritage designation: For Polish immigrants
- Architect(s): Palmer, Willis and Lamden
- Architectural type: Church
- Style: Neo-Renaissance
- Groundbreaking: 1926
- Completed: 1926

Specifications
- Capacity: 1,400
- Length: 225 feet
- Width: 75 feet
- Height: 110 feet

St. Casimir Church is a parish church of the Roman Catholic Archdiocese of Baltimore located in the Canton neighborhood of Baltimore, Maryland.

== History ==
St. Casimir's was established as a parish in 1902, becoming an independent parish in 1904. It was established to serve the needs of the growing Polish American community in Baltimore. The church building was built and dedicated in 1927. By that time the Poles were becoming so numerous in Baltimore that less than a year later another Polish Catholic church was established in a neighboring parish, the Holy Rosary Church. There were over 11,000 Polish immigrants living in Baltimore at the time.

In 2000, the St. Stanislaus Kostka church, another Polish Catholic church in Baltimore, was merged into St. Casimir's and the sacramental registers were transferred to St. Casimir's.

The church is designated as a Polish parish and is administered by the Conventual Franciscans.

== Architecture ==
The building's overall design is in the Neo-Renaissance style. It is also an example of the Polish Cathedral style.

== See also ==
- Polish Americans
- Roman Catholicism in Poland
