= USS Wallacut =

Tugboat of the United States Navy

History

United States
- Name: USS Wallacut
- Namesake: An Anglicized derivation of Native American term which means "place of stones."
- Builder: United States Coast Guard Yard, Curtis Bay, Maryland
- Laid down: 14 August 1944
- Launched: 28 October 1945
- Completed: 23 March 1945
- Commissioned: 31 March 1945
- Recommissioned: 11 August 1950
- Decommissioned: August 1947 (first time); January 1973 (second and final time)
- Reclassified: Medium harbor tug YTM-420 in February 1962
- Stricken: June 1976
- Fate: Sunk as target 1 September 1976

General characteristics
- Class & type: Sassaba-class large harbor tug
- Displacement: 345 tons (full load)
- Length: 100 ft 0 in (30.48 m)
- Beam: 25 ft 0 in (7.62 m)
- Draft: 9 ft 7 in (2.92 m)
- Speed: 12 knots
- Complement: 8

USS Wallacut (YTB-420), later YTM-420, was a tug that served in the United States Navy from 1945 to 1947 and from 1950 to 1976.

Wallacut was laid down on 14 August 1944 by the United States Coast Guard Yard at Curtis Bay, Maryland. She was launched on 28 October 1944, sponsored by Miss Sally Koshorek, and completed on 23 March 1945. She was delivered to the U.S. Navy and placed in service on 31 March 1945.

Wallacut departed Curtis Bay on 8 April 1945 and, after stops at Norfolk, Virginia, Charleston, South Carolina; Miami, Florida; Key West, Florida; New Orleans, Louisiana, and Balboa in the Panama Canal Zone, reached Eniwetok on 21 July 1945. She remained there for two weeks, then moved on, via Guam and Saipan, to Okinawa, where she arrived on 3 September 1945, the day after Japan's formal surrender ceremony ended World War II. She served at Okinawa until June 1947 when she headed, via Guam and Kwajalein, to Pearl Harbor, Hawaii, where she was placed out of service, in reserve, in August 1947.

Wallacut remained in reserve until American involvement in the Korean War increased the U.S. Navy's need for active ships. She returned to active service on 11 August 1950 and departed Pearl Harbor for the Far East on 3 October 1950. After stops at Kwajalein, Guam, and Sasebo, Japan, the tug reached Korean waters on 16 November 1950. She served at Hungnam in December 1950 during the evacuation of United Nations troops following the intervention of Chinese communist troops. At the completion of her part in that operation, she stopped over at Pusan briefly before returning to Sasebo on 27 December 1950.

Records of Wallacut's service after 1950 are almost nonexistent. She continued to be listed as an active unit of the United States First Fleet until 1960, when she was assigned to the Commander, Naval Forces, Far East. Within a year, she was reassigned simply to the United States Pacific Fleet, and her duty location or locations are unrecorded.

In February 1962, Wallacut was redesignated a medium harbor tug and reclassified YTM-420. As such, she continued to serve the Pacific Fleet until January 1973, when she was placed in reserve and berthed at Guam in the Mariana Islands. After three years of inactivity at Guam, she was struck from the Navy list in June 1976. She was sunk as a target on 1 September 1976.
