= Polish Home Hall =

- U.S. National Register of Historic Places
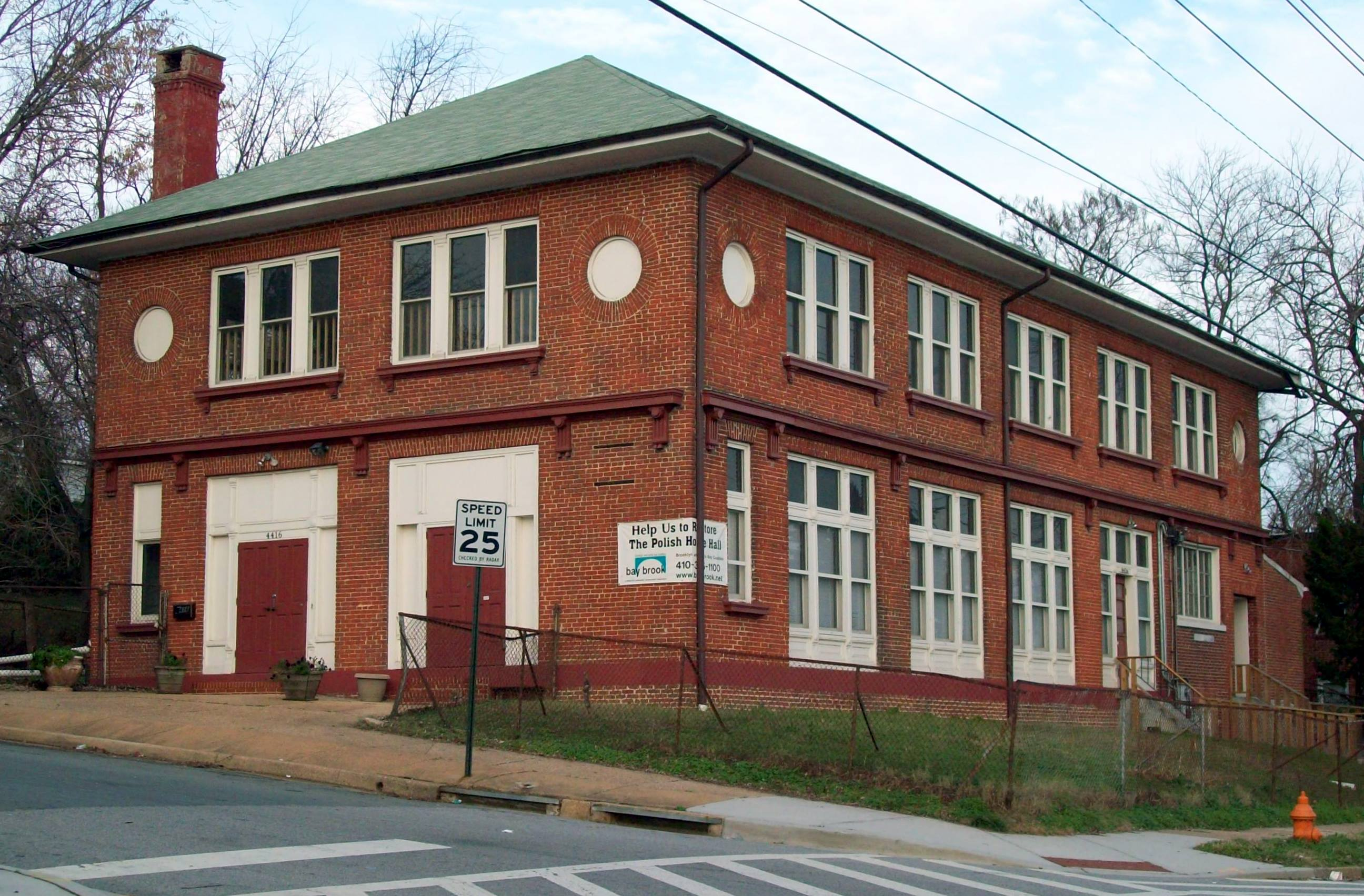
- Polish Home Hall, 4416 Fairhaven Avenue at Filbert Street (southwest corner), Curtis Bay, Baltimore, Maryland – built c. 1905 (or 1909), December 2011

- Location within Baltimore Location within Maryland Location within the United States
- Location: 4416 Fairhaven Avenue, (southwest corner of Fairhaven Avenue and Filbert Street), Curtis Bay, Baltimore, Maryland 21226
- Coordinates: 39°13′31″N 76°35′25″W
- Area: less than one acre
- Built: c. 1905
- Architectural style: Beaux Arts
- NRHP reference No.: 07001311
- Added to NRHP: December 26, 2007

Polish Home Hall is a historic building located in the waterfront industrial/commercial/residential and heavily ethnic community of Curtis Bay in southern Baltimore, Maryland, United States. Built on the southwest corner of Fairhaven Avenue (formerly known as Fairview Avenue before mid-1920s) and Filbert Street near the top of the commanding heights overlooking to the east the sloping streets of the neighborhood of Curtis Bay, about four city blocks wide (east to west) and 15 blocks length (north to south).

The Curtis Bay Town Hall of 1905/1909 (and later Polish Home Hall by 1925) is a large two-story (with a third story attic under a sloping shingle roof), structure of masonry / dark red brick with stone trim, of vernacular Beaux-Arts architectural style building bearing classical features and symmetry. It was constructed about 1905 as the town hall, real estate/developers offices, volunteer fire company station, and a meeting/assembly hall on the large second floor for the small community of Curtis Bay within the southern limits of the City of Baltimore, to which it was absorbed in the third major annexation in municipal history in January 1919, from adjoining northern Anne Arundel County as the city also expanded in the other three directions – north, east and west into surrounding Baltimore County also.

In 1925, the United Polish Societies purchased the building from the developing firm of the South Baltimore Harbor and Improvement Company and renamed it Polish Home Hall and it became central to the increasing Polish immigrant influx experience in Curtis Bay which had been flooding in along with large numbers of other Eastern European nationalities coming in from overseas through the Locust Point immigration station and piers for the B.&O. Railroad and their connections with the North German Lloyd shipping line in Bremen and Hamburg, the second largest immigration station in the United States, next to New York Citys Ellis Island, since the early 1900s, This added tremendously to the original heavily Anglo-English and German residents originally predominating since the town's founding in the late 1880s. Curtis Bay underwent a radical transformation and evolved and grew quite differently from more "Americanized" residential suburb of nearby Brooklyn, with much less industrial and port / railroad development. The newly acquired Polish Home Hall soon functioned as a social, educational, and political center for Curtis Bay's growing expanding Polish community (along with several other East European peoples attracted to the same community of neighboring Slavic immigrants, with the second largest numbers of Poles and others in a Baltimore neighborhood besides near Fells Point and adjacent Canton or Highlandtown communities, further northeast across the Patapsco River / Baltimore Harbor in the southeast part of the city, which remained heavily ethnic Polish into the 1970s.

After over a century of little appreciation and recognition, the Polish Home Hall in Curtis Bay was listed on the National Register of Historic Places, maintained by the National Park Service of the U.S. Department of the Interior in 2007.
