= Merhavia =

Merhavia (Hebrew: מרחביה) may refer to:

- Merhavia (kibbutz), a kibbutz in northern Israel
- Merhavia (moshav), a moshav in northern Israel originally known as the Co-operative in Merhavia
