= Hawkins Point, Baltimore =

- Neighborhood
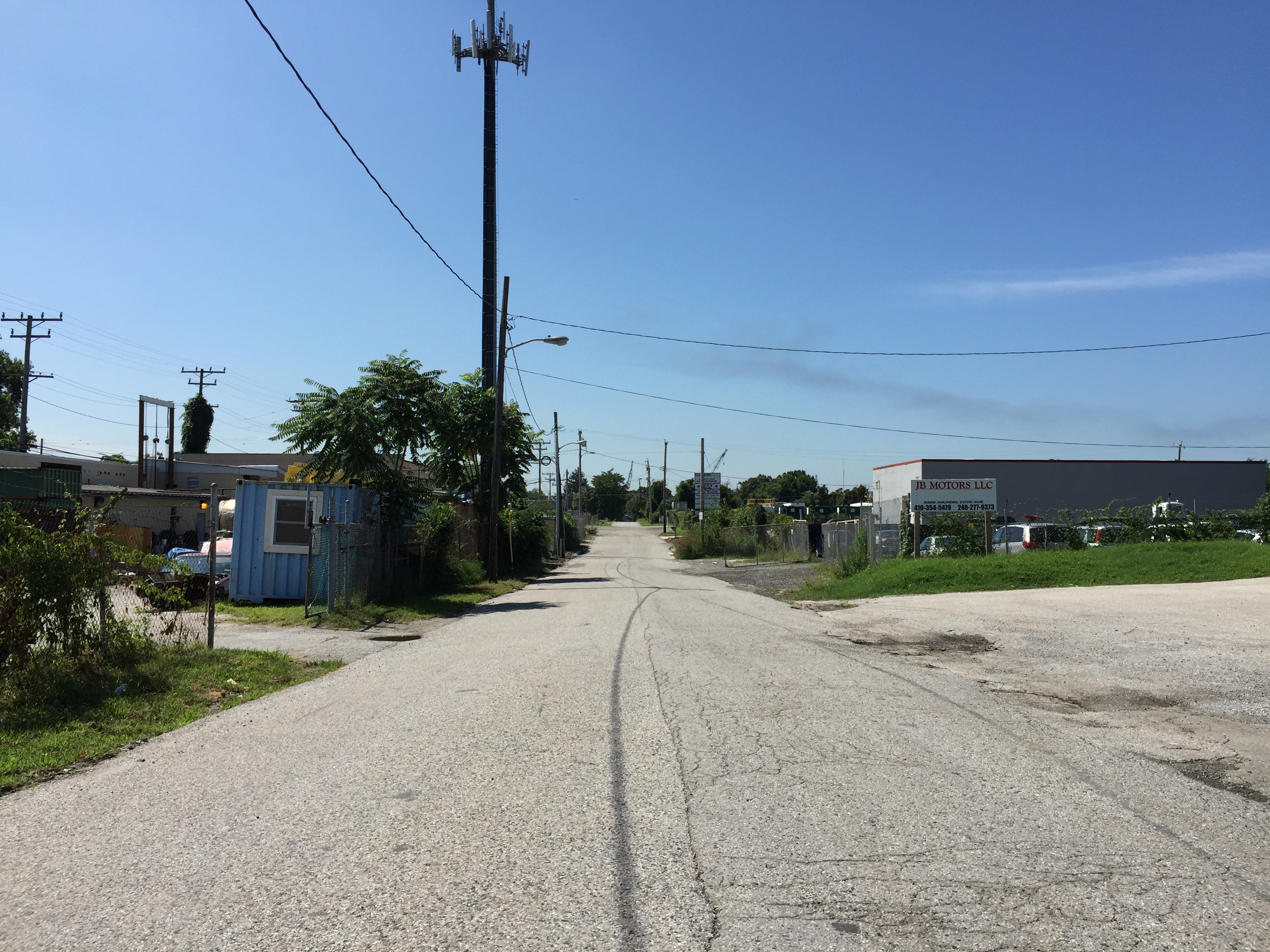
- View from Arundel Cove Avenue at Hawkins Point Road

- Location within Baltimore
- Coordinates: 39.2089°N 76.5495°W
- Country: United States
- State: Maryland
- City: Baltimore

Area
  - Total: 2.618 sq mi (6.78 km^{2})
  - Land: 2.618 sq mi (6.78 km^{2})
- Elevation: 20 ft (6.1 m)

Population (2020)
  - Total: 24
  - Density: 9.2/sq mi (3.5/km^{2})
- Time zone: UTC-5 (Eastern)
  - Summer (DST): UTC-4 (EDT)
- ZIP code: 21226
- Area code: 410, 443, and 667

Hawkins Point is a neighborhood in the South District of Baltimore, located at the southern tip of the city between Curtis Bay (north) and the Anne Arundel County line (south) and Thoms Cove (east). Its land area covers 2.6 square miles (6.7 km^{2}), and it had a population of 24 people according to the 2020 U.S. census. The neighborhood is predominantly industrial.

Industrial residents of Hawkins Point include the Quarantine Road Sanitary Landfill, owned by Baltimore City, a 67-acre hazardous waste landfill at 5501 Quarantine Road, owned by the Maryland Port Administration (MPA) and now a Superfund site and a foundry at 4000 Hawkins Point Road owned by Eastalco Aluminum Company.

== Geography ==
Hawkins Point is separated from the rest of Baltimore City by the Baltimore Harbor, located on a peninsula bounded to the south by the Marley Neck area of Anne Arundel County. Marley Neck is a low to medium density area of mixed residential and industrial use which is considered to be part of the greater Pasadena area.

== History ==
=== Quarantine station ===
Quarantine Road, which runs perpendicular to the Baltimore Beltway and Hawkins Point Road, takes its name from the quarantine stations that operated there throughout the history of the neighborhood. The first quarantine hospital was built there following the yellow fever epidemic of 1794, and another was built in the late 1800s, operating through the mid-20th century. Patients sent to the station arrived by boat rather than the rough overland roads. The Hawkins Point quarantine site went on to be taken over by the federal government as part of a national system for disease prevention. The federal government closed the station in 1960, city officials attempted to acquire the land to turn it into a park. The park proposal was met with opposition from the Maryland Port Authority on the grounds that it would inhibit their port and industrial development program. Today, Quarantine Road is the site of a city landfill and a United States Gypsum wallboard manufacturing facility.

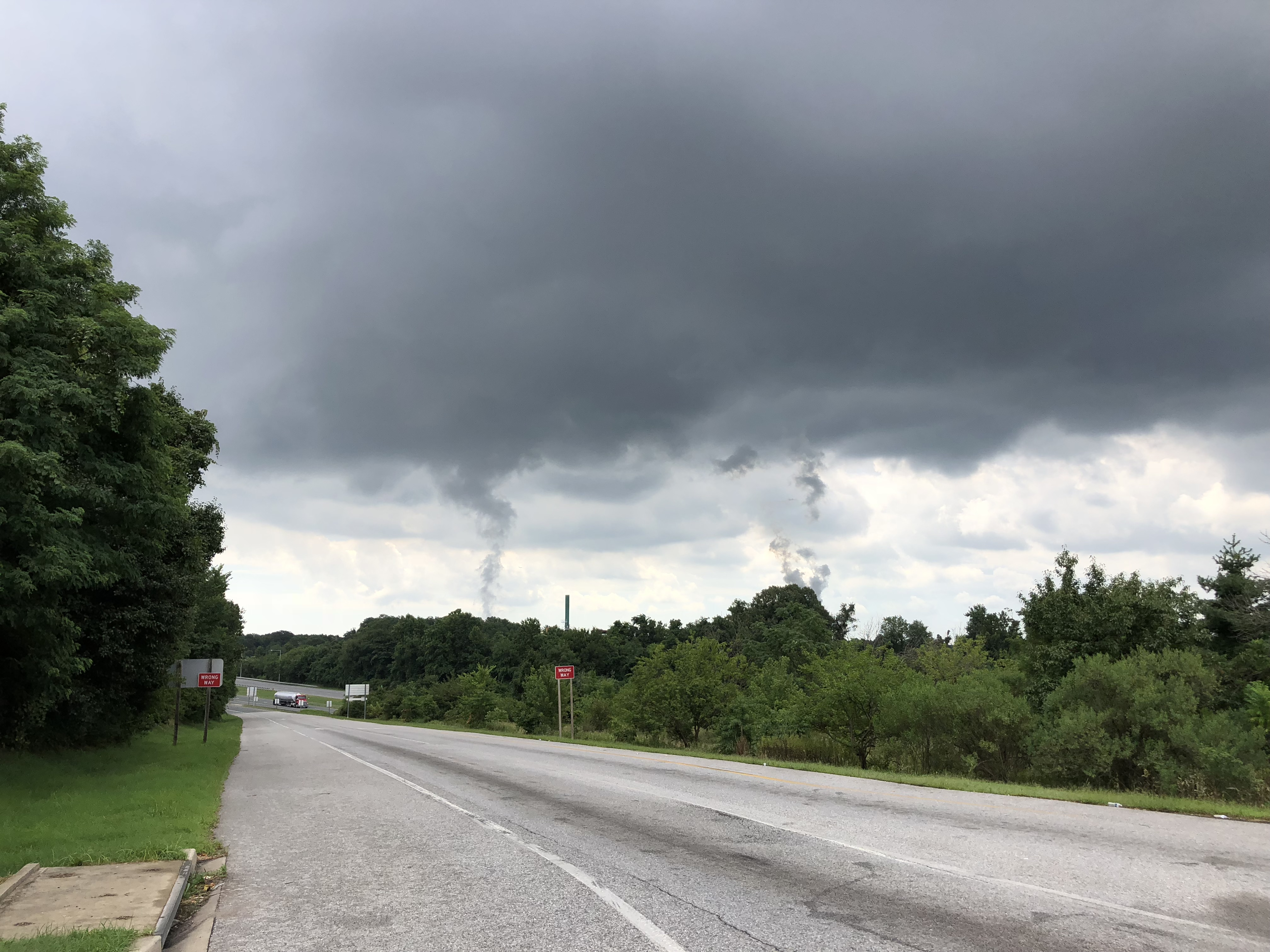
Smoke clouds from industrial plants visible from the Baltimore Beltway at Quarantine Road in 2019

=== Residential settlement ===
Permanent residents first moved into Hawkins Point in the late 19th century. The descendants of the original residents continued to live there for multiple subsequent generations. The neighborhood was an integrated community, and one of the first in Baltimore City in which black residents were homeowners.

Hawkins Point had a few manufacturers and a quarantine for new immigrants in the early 20th century; the Coast Guard Yard was the dominant employer in the area. When the area became a hub for a larger scale of industrial activity during and after World War II, inhabitants of the small residential community remained. Hawkins Point residents faced health hazards, infrastructural decay, dangerous road conditions, and a sporadic relationship with municipal services due to the city's neglect in favor of industry. In 1982, the neighborhood had a population of 45 residents making up 22 families; by 1996, only four households remained. There were 2 people living in Hawkins Point according to the 2010 U.S. census, however, the 2020 Census recorded a population increase to 24 people, concentrated on two blocks in the Arundel Cove area on Bungalow Avenue.

== Demographics ==
Historical population
Year	Pop.	±%
1982	45	—
2010	2	−95.6%
2020	24	+1100.0%

Based on data from the 2020 United States Census, the population of Hawkins Point was 24, a change of 22 (1100.0%) from the 2 counted in 2010. Covering an area of 2.618 square miles (6.78 square kilometers), the neighborhood had a population density of 9.2 inhabitants per square mile (3.6 inhabitants/km^{2}). The racial makeup of the neighborhood was 29.2% (7) White alone, 29.2% (7) White and African American, 8.3% (2) White and some other race, and 33.3% (8) from other races alone. None of the population identified as African American alone, Native American, Asian, or Pacific Islander.

== Industrial activity ==
=== Hazardous waste landfill ===
In January 2011, the Maryland Department of the Environment approved use of the MPA landfill by Millennium Inorganic Chemicals (a subsidiary of Cristal Global) to dispose of coal ash from three coal-fired power plants operating in the Baltimore area. The site of the hazardous waste landfill was purchased by the MPA in 1958 to dispose of chrome ore processing residue from a former manufacturing site in Baltimore of AlliedSignal, now used by the Port of Baltimore.

=== Millennium Inorganic plant ceases manufacturing ===
Cristal Global announced that it has permanently ceased manufacturing at its Hawkins Point plant on August 10, 2010. Located on a 318-acre site at 3901 Fort Armistead Road, the plant was used by the former Millennium Inorganic Chemicals since 1954 to manufacture titanium dioxide. The plant was idled by Cristal Global during March 2009 in response to a severe downturn in market conditions.

=== Other industrial residents ===
Other industrial residents of Hawkins Point include: Reichold Chemicals, Inc. at 6401 Chemical Road; Grace Division, Curtis Bay Works at 5500 Chemical Road; USG Corporation at 5500 Quarantine Road; and BOC Gases at 3901 Fort Armistead Road.

== Fort Armistead Park ==
Fort Armistead Park is the site of a United States Army coastal defense fort which was built from 1897 to 1901, and was active from 1901 to 1920. The park is on the far southeastern coast of Hawkins Point, on the boundary with Anne Arundel County, and features a network of underground tunnels beneath the concrete fort remains. The park is utilized by visitors for recreation, but has developed a reputation for disrepair due to its relative seclusion. The park was the site of a music festival called Starscape from 1999 to 2012.

== Transportation ==
=== Highways ===
Interstate 695, the Baltimore Beltway, passes through the district, crossing the Patapsco River on the Francis Scott Key Bridge until its collapse in March 2024. (One of the three temporary alternate shipping channels was named Hawkins Point.)

=== Public transportation ===
The Maryland Transit Administration runs the LocalLink 67 bus route daily from Baltimore City Hall to Marley Neck, which passes through Hawkins Point at three stops along Hawkins Point Road and one on Fort Smallwood Road before it enters Anne Arundel County. The route has lower ridership than much of the system, with most passengers who board or alight in Hawkins Point doing so at the Fort Smallwood Road & Fort Armistead Road stop.

Prior to the service changes brought on by the BaltimoreLink development in 2017, Hawkins Point was served by Route 64, which connected Downtown Baltimore to Curtis Bay and made selected branch trips as far as Davison Chemical and the Coast Guard Yard throughout its history starting in 1977. The first bus service to Hawkins Point was Route X, a shuttle from the end of the No. 6 Curtis Bay Streetcar Line established in 1946, which was re-designated in 1948 as Route 63 as it became a connector for the Route 6 bus which replaced the street car, and then absorbed into the Route 6 line in 1951. Route 63 was reinstated as a line connecting Downtown Baltimore to Riviera Beach in 1977, was cut to a shuttle from Patapsco in 1993 and discontinued in 1996, leaving Route 64 as the sole service through Hawkins Point and farther localions.

The Express BusLink 164, a commuter service offered by the MTA twice in the morning and twice in the evening from Riviera Beach to Downtown Baltimore, operated until summer 2021 on weekdays and stopped in Hawkins Point. The route was discontinued as part of a series of service changes taking effect on August 29, 2021, due to low ridership.

== See also ==
- List of Baltimore neighborhoods
