= John O'Donnell (merchant) =

Irish merchant (1749–1805)

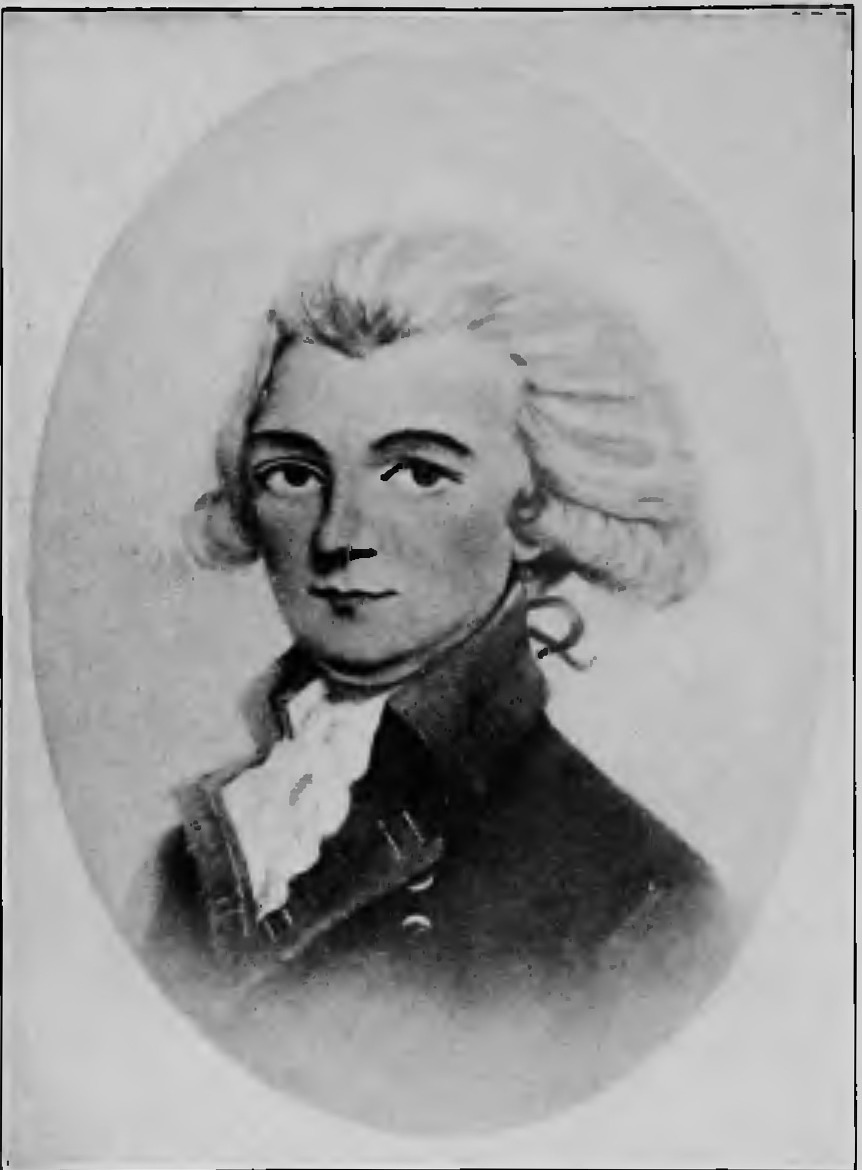
Photo of John O'Donnell

John O'Donnell (1749–1805) was an Irish merchant based in Baltimore, Maryland. After spending many years in his early life adventuring and trading in East Asia, he settled in Baltimore, establishing a plantation that would become the neighbourhood of Canton.

A bronze statue of him, sculpted by Tylden Streett stood in Canton's O'Donnell Square Park from 1980 to 2021, when it was ordered removed by Mayor Brandon Scott.

== Biography ==
O'Donnell, born in Limerick, Ireland in 1749, was a merchant whose ship, the Pallas, is believed to be the first to reach China from Baltimore, Maryland. His ship returned to the city in August 1785, carrying rich cargo including teas, porcelain, satins, silk, paper wall-hangings, cinnamon, rhubarb, and opium. Upon hearing of the sale, George Washington sent Colonel Tench Tilghman with a list of articles he wanted "if great bargains are to be had — my purchases depends entirely on the prices". In 1786, he purchased a 2,000-acre plot in Baltimore using the profits earned from selling the goods, naming it after the Chinese city of Guangzhou (anglicized as Canton) in honor of the goods he brought back from the city. The neighborhood of Canton, Baltimore, along with its O'Donnell Square, would take its name from O'Donnell's property. The 1790 United States census listed 36 enslaved people lived on O'Donnell's plantation.

O'Donnell later made another voyage to the East, returning after an absence of two and a half years on June 29, 1789, and offering his ship, the Chesapeake, and its cargo from India and China for sale. The Chesapeake was the first American vessel to trade with India and the first to fly the United States flag on the River Ganges. After his return, he asked Secretary of State Thomas Jefferson twice, first in 1789 and again in 1793, to serve as the commissioner of the United States to India. He was turned down both times.

During one of his trips to the East in 1799, O'Donnell was captured by Arabs and sold into slavery. In his letters, he described his party being plundered and harshly imprisoned. He lost a great sum of his fortune in the raid, and eventually freed himself by surrendering the rest of his fortune through negotiations in Egypt. Upon his return, he worked over the years to rebuild what he had lost.

O'Donnell died at age 56 at Canton on October 5, 1805. At the time of his death, he was one of the wealthiest men in the United States. He was buried at the Westminster Hall and Burying Ground, but was later reinterred in a family plot at Green Mount Cemetery, however there is no record of this reinterment.

== Statue ==
Statue of John O'Donnell
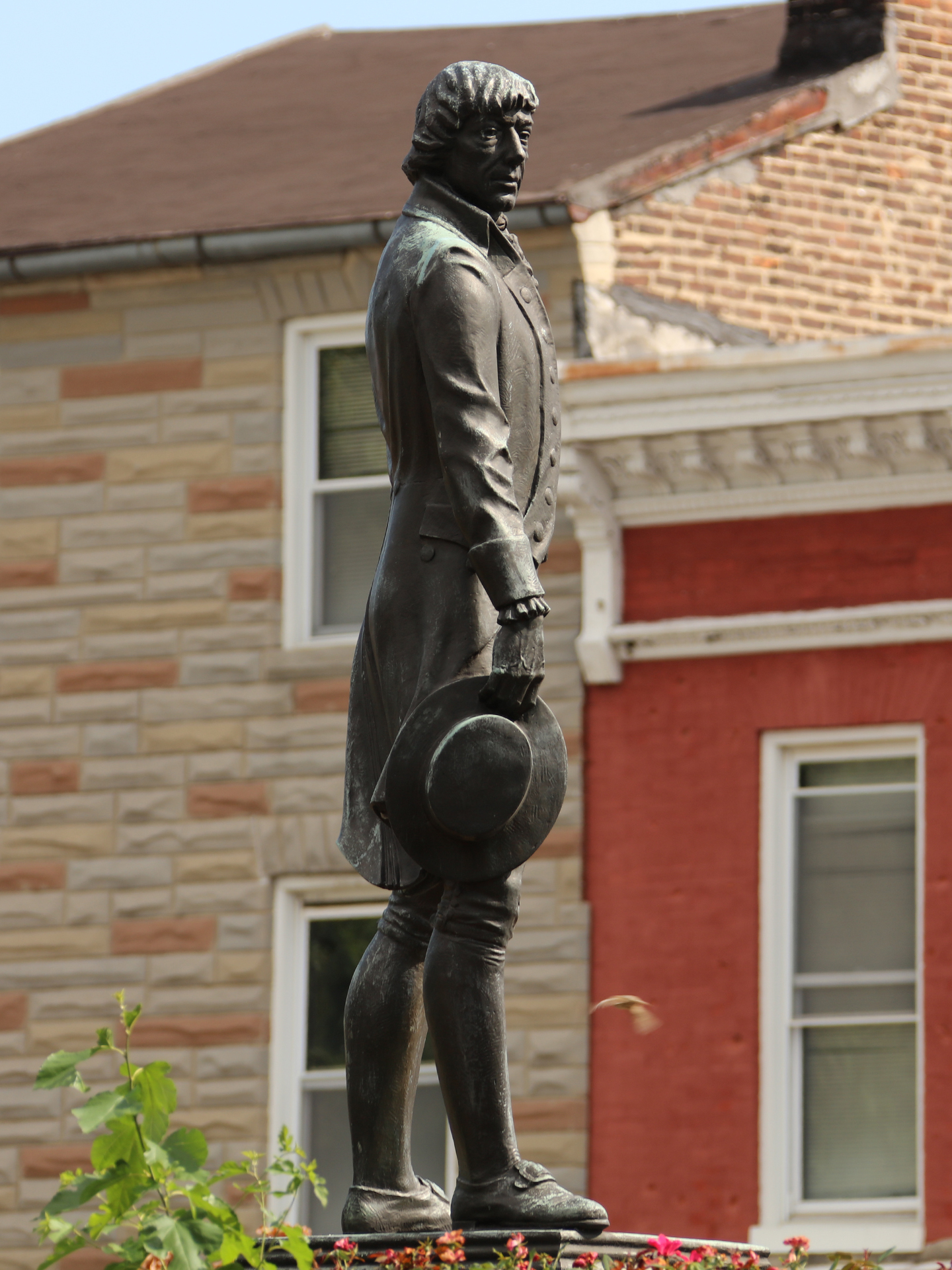
- The statue in 2017
- Artist: Tylden Streett
- Completion date: 1980; 46 years ago
- Medium: Bronze sculpture
- Location: Baltimore, Maryland, U.S.; 39.28022°N 76.57472°W

A bronze statue of O'Donnell, designed by local artist Tylden Streett, was erected in O'Donnell Square Park by the Canton Improvement Association in 1980, two years after the neighborhood was added to the National Register of Historic Places. A marker installed by the administration of Baltimore Mayor William Donald Schaefer called O'Donnell "a man of great vision and accomplishment".

=== Removal ===
During global protests following the murder of George Floyd in Minneapolis, a Change.org petition calling for Mayor Bernard C. Young to remove the O'Donnell statue was filed, and had almost 600 signatures by October 2020. In July 2020, street artists placed a whip and cotton stalk in the hand of the statue to bring attention to the statue and call for its removal. Baltimore City Council President Brandon Scott, the city's Democratic nominee for mayor, called for the creation of "a truth and reconciliation committee to look at statues, monuments, and street names across our city — not just for this statue, but all of them". In November, the Canton Anti-Racism Alliance and the Canton Community Association issued a letter to Young calling for the statue's immediate removal. In April 2021, Mayor Brandon Scott ordered the statue's removal and announced, with City Administrator Christopher Shorter, the formation of a team to evaluate the fates of other monuments in Baltimore.
