= Thoms Cove =

Cove in Maryland, United States

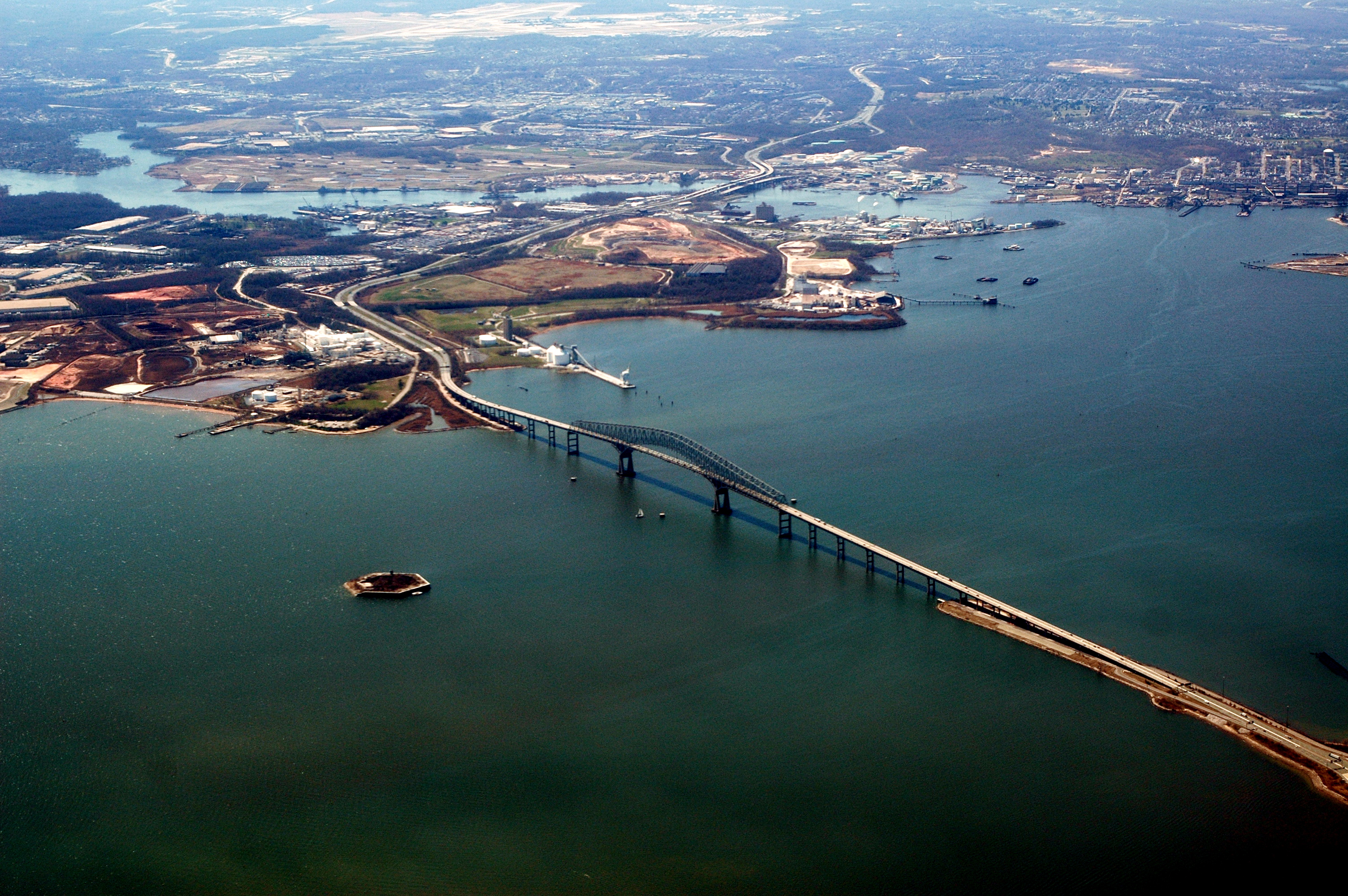
- Thoms Cove in the distance

- Location within Maryland
- Location: Hawkins Point, Baltimore
- Coordinates: 39.212°N 76.547°W
- River sources: Patapsco River
- Max. width: 3,000 feet (910 m)
- Average depth: 80 feet (24 m)
- Salinity: Brackish
- Shore length^{1}: 6,000 feet (1,800 m)
- Frozen: Seasonal
- Islands: 0
- Settlements: Baltimore
- ^{1} Shore length is not a well-defined measure.

Thoms Cove, the nickname for Thomas Cove, is a natural cove approximately 1,500 feet (0.28 mi) in diameter in Hawkins Point, Baltimore on the northeastern end of the peninsula with the tidal Patapsco River to the northeast, Curtis Bay to the northwest, Hawkins Point to the west and I-695 to the south.

Thoms Cove is bordered by Eastalco Aluminum Company's loading and storage facility and a Superfund landfill. It is in the USGS quadrangle "Curtis Bay" and a Maryland grid coordinate of 500800N and 928000E and is largely administered by the Maryland Port Administration.
