= Lamdan =

Man who is well informed in rabbinical literature

Lamdan (Hebrew: למדן) is a late Hebrew expression for a man who is well informed in rabbinical literature, although not a scholar in the technical sense of the term - i.e. "talmid hakham"; it does not seem to have been used before the 18th century.

- Ezekiel Katzenellenbogen (1670-1749) decided that rabbinical scholars were exempt from paying taxes even though scholars then were not scholars in the proper sense of the word, "for the law does not make a difference between lamdan and lamdan".
- Jacob Emden speaks of Baer Kohen (Berent Salomon), the founder of the Klaus in Hamburg, as having been somewhat of a scholar ("ketzat lamdan," the equivalent of the Yiddish "ein stückel lamden").
- Authorities of the sixteenth century, when they have to speak of the difference between a scholar in the technical sense of the word and a well-informed man, do not use the term "lamdan," but say "tzurba me-rabbanan", צורְבָא מֵרָבּנן, literally "enflamed from Rabbinic literature".

== People ==
Lamdan has also been adopted as a Jewish surname:

- Yitzhak Lamdan
