= Murder of Carolyn Wasilewski =

Unsolved murder in Baltimore

Carolyn Wasilewski
- Born: Carolyn Loretta Wasilewski; June 12, 1940; Baltimore, Maryland, U.S.
- Died: November 8, 1954 (aged 14); Baltimore, Maryland, U.S.
- Cause of death: Homicide
- Body discovered: November 9, 1954
- Known for: Victim of an unsolved murder

Carolyn Loretta Wasilewski (June 12, 1940 – November 8, 1954) was the 14-year-old victim of an unsolved murder that made national headlines during an intensive search for suspects near her home in Baltimore, Maryland. Her remains were discovered in a rail yard by an engineer on a Pennsy express train bound to Baltimore from Harrisburg, Pennsylvania, on the morning of November 9, 1954.

== Death ==
Not far from her family's home, police found bloodstains and personal items belonging to Wasilewski. "Long before she was identified police had concluded that the murder had occurred elsewhere and she had been thrown from the bridge or dragged down a bank to the tracks," reported The Baltimore Sun in 1954. Written on her right thigh in lipstick or Mercurochrome was the name Paul. Seven days earlier on November 1, she had testified in a carnal knowledge case involving one of her female friends.

== Aftermath ==
A column published in The Baltimore Sun in March, 2000 referred to the murder without mentioning Wasilewski by name. It provoked a column, also in the Sun, by Frederick N. Rasmussen in which he describes the discovery of the body and investigation in some detail, along with the crowds that gathered for the funeral, and quotes a Baltimore homicide detective who said that interest in the half-century-old murder was still surfacing, "We still get calls generally around the anniversary of the murder."

Baltimore Sun columnist Jacques Kelly speculated that the case became a "Baltimore legend," precisely because it was unsolved. The murder and its period of notoriety in Baltimore "loosely" inspired John Waters' 1990 film Cry-Baby. Waters recalls the media's framing of the case in the context of the negative aspects of Baltimore's "drape" youth subculture.

== See also ==
- Crime in Baltimore
- List of unsolved murders (1900–1979)
