= Henry Einspruch =

Rev Henry Einspruch
- חיים אײנשפּרוך
- Born: Henry Jechiel Einspruch; 27 December 1892; Tarnów, Galicia, Austria-Hungary
- Died: 4 January 1977 (aged 84); National Lutheran Home for the Aged, Washington, D.C., US
- Burial place: Parkwood Cemetery and Mausoleum, Baltimore
- Occupations: Pastor; translator
- Spouse(s): Jacoba Einspruch (died 1937) Marie Gerlach Einspruch
- Children: 2

Rev Henry Einspruch (Yiddish: חיים אײנשפּרוך; 1892–1977) was a Polish-born American Lutheran pastor and translator of Christian literature. A Jewish convert to Lutheranism, Einspruch was a Messianic missionary affiliated with the Hebrew Christian movement.

Einspruch's most notable work was the 1941 Yiddish translation of the New Testament.

== Early life ==
Henry Jechiel Einspruch was born on 27 December 1892 in Tarnów, Galicia, Austria-Hungary (present-day, Poland) to a Yiddish-speaking family. His father Mendel was a scholar, an iron merchant, and a Santser Hassid. His mother Mirl was the daughter of the cantor of the main synagogue in the city of Jarosław. As a teenager, Einspruch was drawn to Christianity. Raised in a Yiddish-speaking home, he was a yeshiva student who studied under the rabbi of Barnov. Einspruch attended a Baron Hirsch School and the Tarnów High School. Along with other Jewish socialists, Einspruch was active in the Poale Zion movement and helped organize a strike of clerks, tailors, and teachers at religious elementary schools. He began his literary career in 1908–1909, working as the Tarnów correspondent for Poale Zion's magazine Der Yidisher Arbeyter (The Jewish Worker). In 1909, at the age of 17, he made aliyah to Ottoman Palestine and worked at Merhavia, a moshav in Galilee. In 1911, he immigrated to the Khedivate of Egypt. After living in Egypt, he returned to Poland and converted to Christianity under the guidance of the Jewish-born Messianic missionary Khayem (Lucky) Yedidiah Pollak. By 1913, he had immigrated to the United States and lived in Cleveland and New York City, working at a restaurant and an iron factory. Moving to Chicago, he studied at Moody Bible Institute and graduated in 1916; he also studied at McCormick Theological Seminary. He moved to Baltimore in 1920 and studied at Johns Hopkins University.

== Career as Christian missionary ==
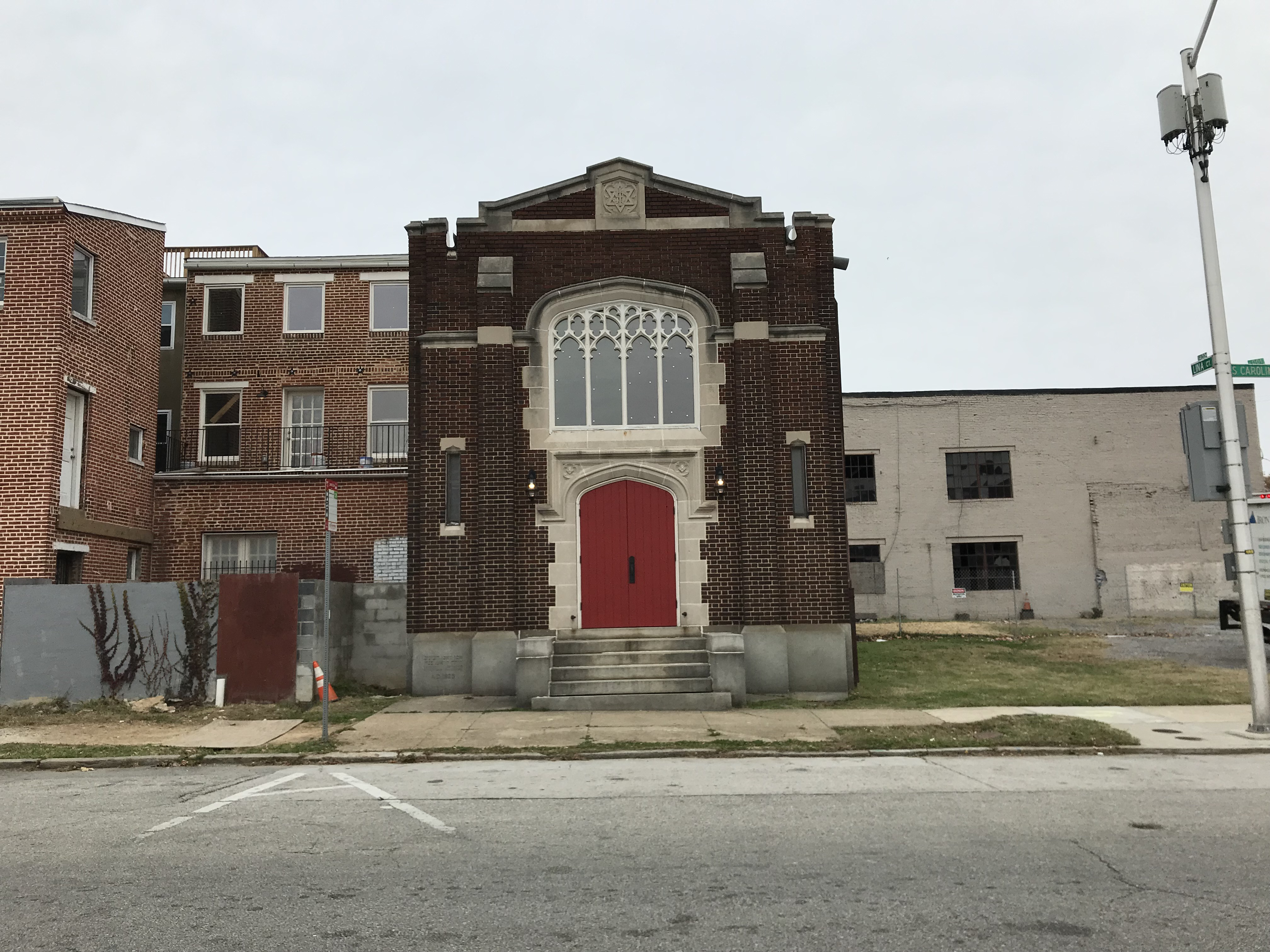
Former building of Salem Hebrew Lutheran Mission, Baltimore, 2018.

in 1923, Einspruch founded the Salem Hebrew Lutheran Mission in East Baltimore, located at the intersection of South Caroline and East Baltimore streets in Baltimore's historic Jewish quarter close to Corned Beef Row. The Salem Hebrew Lutheran Mission's church building has a Magen David above its entrance with the Greek letters iota eta sigma (IHS, a monogram for "Jesus Christ"). Einspruch founded Lederer Messianic Jewish Communications, which became the largest publisher of "Hebrew-Christian" literature in the world. On Shabbat, Einspruch was known to regularly stand on a soapbox in front of various Baltimore-area synagogues and deliver Christian sermons in the Yiddish language.

== In popular culture ==
Mikhl Yashinsky's play "The Gospel According to Chaim" (די בשׂורה לויט חיים, Di psure loyt khaim) dramatizes Einspruch's life and his attempts to publish the New Testament in Yiddish. The play, produced by the New Yiddish Rep in 2023, was the first new, full-length Yiddish play in seven decades.

== Personal life ==
Einspruch married Jacoba Gertrude Einspruch (1896–1937) with whom he had one child.

Einspruch later married Marie Gerlach Einspruch (1909 – 2012), a Lutheran missionary and later director of Messianic Jewish Resources. Einspruch and Gerlach Einspruch had one child. Gerlach Einspruch was the official typesetter for Einspruch's 1941 Yiddish translation of the New Testament.

On 4 January 1977 Einspruch died at the National Lutheran Home for the Aged, in Washington, D.C. aged 77. Einspruch is buried at the Parkwood Cemetery and Mausoleum, Baltimore.

== Bibliography ==
- Einspruch, Henry. 600,000,000 People Can't Be Wrong: A Modern Jew Looks at Jesus, Chicago: Good News Publishers, [date of publication not identified]
- Einspruch, Henry. Der Brīf fūn Yaʻqov ha-shaliyaḥ, Baltimore: The Mediator, [1933?]
- Einspruch, Henry. Der Bris Hadoshe, Balṭimore: Laybush un Ḥayah Lederer Fond, 1959.
- Einspruch, Henry; Geden, A. S.; Kilgour, R.; American Bible Society. Dīʼ gūṭeʻ Beśūrah lōyṭ Matyaʼ : ʼa nayyeʻ ʼībeʻrzeʻṣūng., New York : American Bible Society, 1925.
- Einspruch, Henry. Jewish Confessors of the Faith, Brooklyn, N.Y.: Amsterdam Bd. of Missions to the Jews, 1925.
- Einspruch, Henry. Lider fun gloybn Hymns of faith, rendered into Yiddish, Baltimore, Mediator, 1935; reissued 1945.
- Einspruch, Henry. When Jews face Christ, Brooklyn: American Board of Missions to the Jews, 1939.
