= Merhavia (moshav) =

Place in northern Israel

Merhavia: מֶרְחַבְיָה (Hebrew)
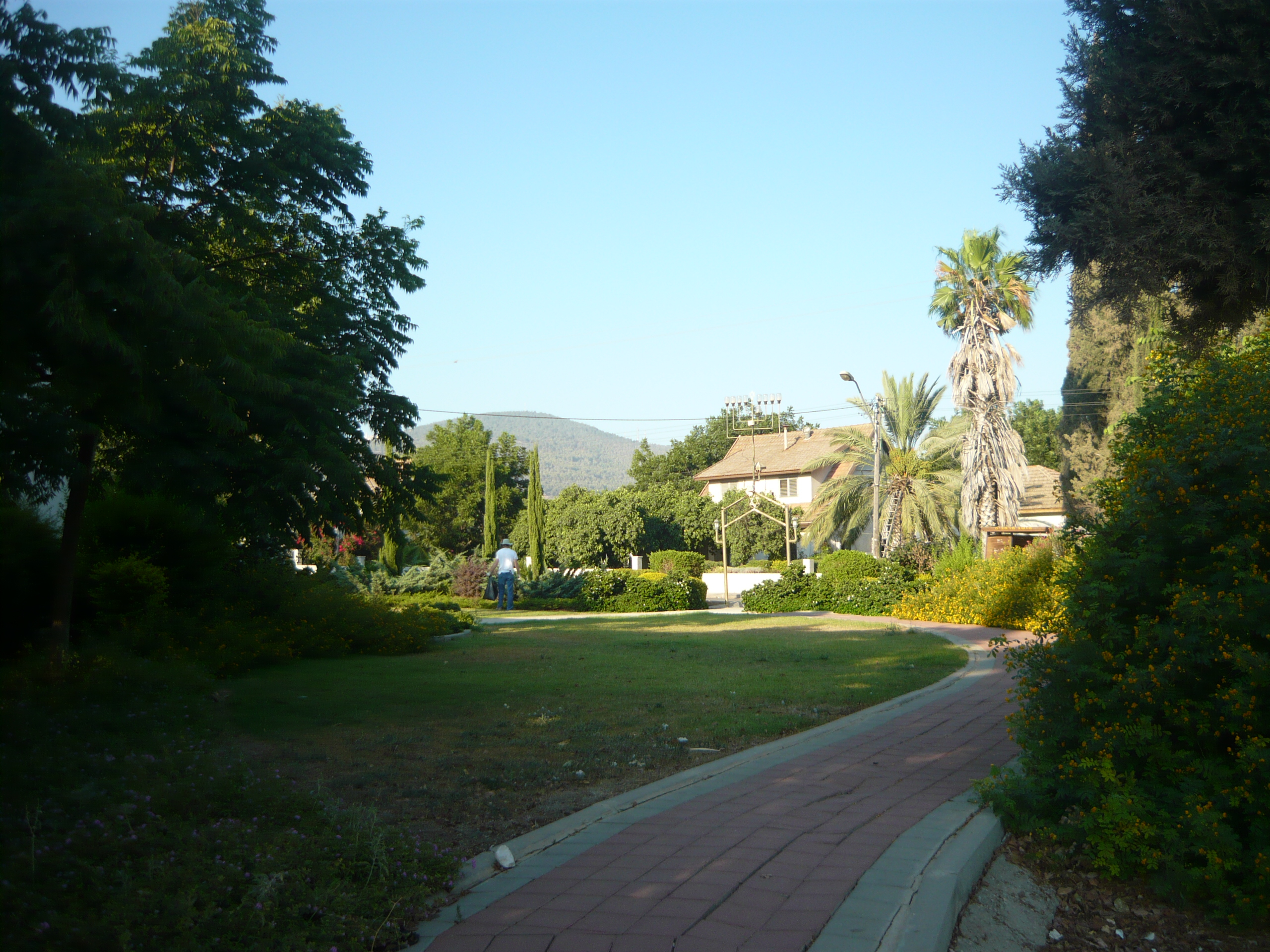

- Location within Jezreel Valley region of Israel
- Coordinates: 32°36′17″N 35°18′29″E
- Country: Israel
- District: Northern
- Subdistrict: Jezreel
- Council: Jezreel Valley
- Affiliation: Moshavim Movement
- Founded: 1911
- Founder: Kvutzat Kibush members and Second Aliyah immigrants
- Population (2024): 734
- Website: www.merhavia.com

Merhavia (Hebrew: מֶרְחַבְיָה, lit. "Space of God") is a moshav in northern Israel. It falls under the jurisdiction of Jezreel Valley Regional Council and in 2024 had a population of 734. Founded in 1911, it was the first modern Jewish settlement in the Jezreel Valley.

== Etymology ==
The name Merhavia is derived from the Book of Psalms 118:5.

Out of my straits I called upon the LORD; He answered me with great enlargement.

In the metaphorical sense: "God set me free" - the experience of the Jews immigrating to the Land of Israel and achieving a new homeland without the straits of persecution.

== History ==
=== Co-operative ===
The village was established as the Co-operative in Merhavia, a co-operative farm, at the beginning of 1911, based on the ideas of Franz Oppenheimer. The founders had arrived in the area in 1910 and consisted of members of Kvutzat Kibush and workers of the Second Aliyah. It was supposed to operate as a co-operative farm with differential wages, and was founded with the assistance of Arthur Ruppin, Yehoshua Hankin, the Anglo-Palestine Bank and Eliyahu Blumenfeld. Alexander Baerwald designed and built the first solid buildings and the road net with a central square in 1915.

=== Moshav ===
In 1922 it was converted to a moshav ovdim after being joined by Polish-Jewish immigrants and residents of Tel Aviv who wanted to work in agriculture. According to a census conducted in the same year by the British Mandate authorities, the settlement had a population of 135 Jews.

In 1929 a kibbutz, also by the name of Merhavia, was established next to the moshav.

=== Gallery ===
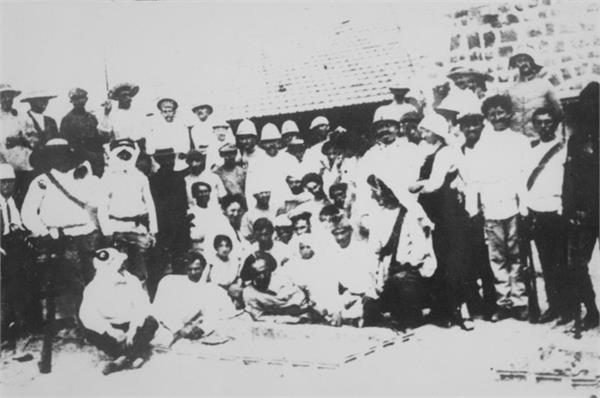
Merhavia founders 1910

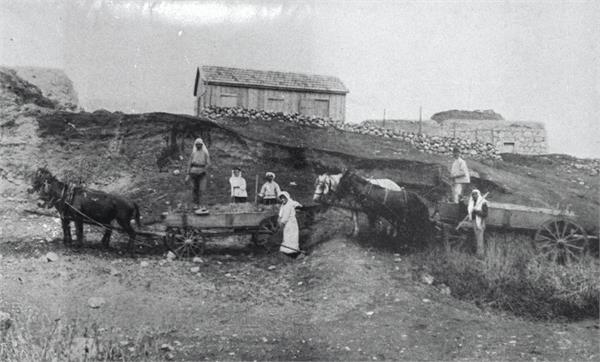
Merhavia first building 1911

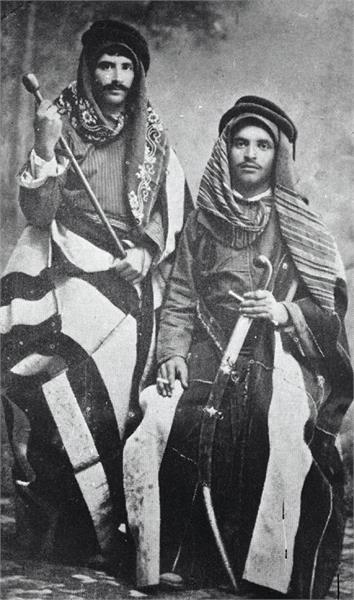
Merhavia members of Hashomer 1915

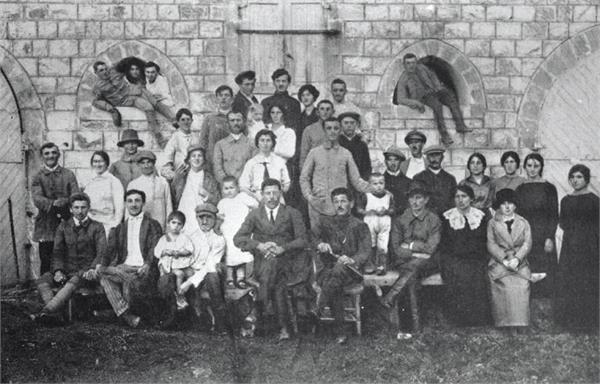
Merhavia residents 1920

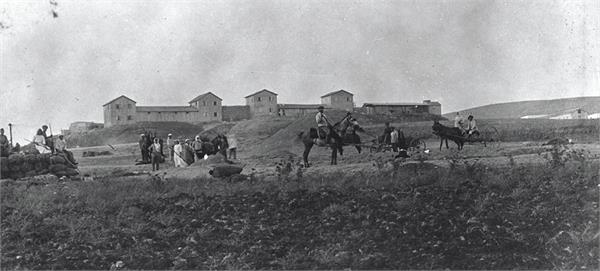
Merhavia 1921

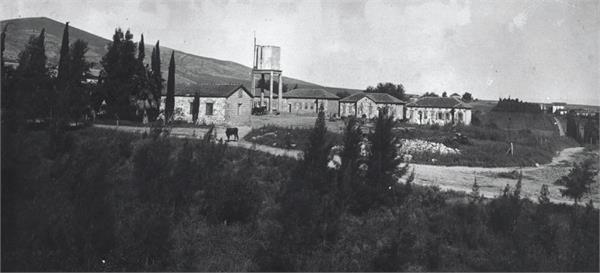
Merhavia 1929

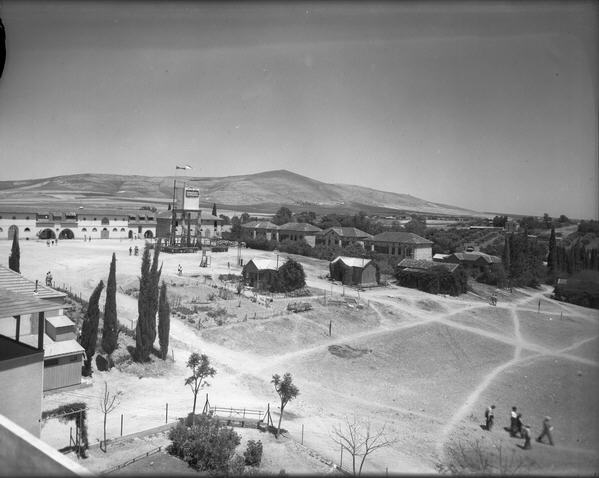
Merhavia 1941

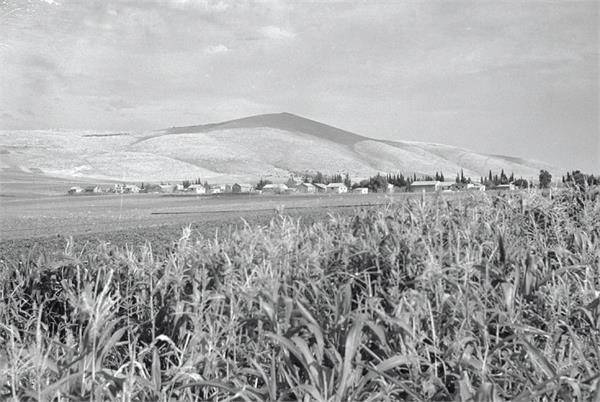
Moshav Merhavia 1947

== Notable residents ==
- Henry Einspruch (1892–1977), a Galician-born Jew who converted to Lutheranism, becoming a Messianic missionary affiliated with the Hebrew Christian movement, best known for translating the Christian New Testament into Yiddish.
