= Holy Rosary Church (Baltimore) =

Coordinates: 39.286567°N 76.587269°W

- Baltimore Holy Rosary Church
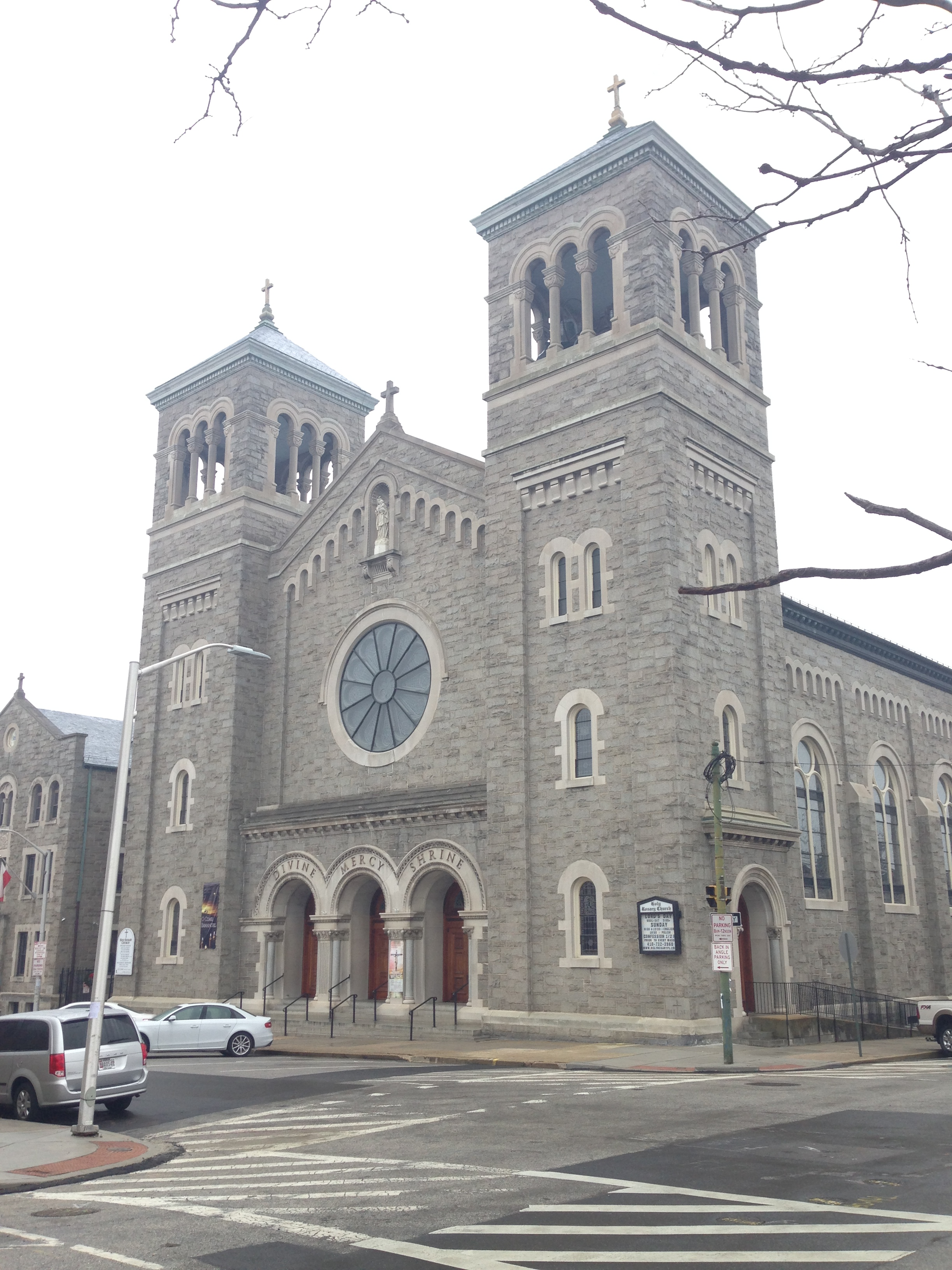

- Location within Baltimore
- Location: Baltimore
- Country: United States
- Denomination: Roman Catholic
- Website: baltimore.eparafia.pl/

History
- Founded: December 8, 1887; 138 years ago
- Founder: Polish immigrants
- Dedicated: March 15, 1928; 98 years ago

Architecture
- Functional status: Active
- Heritage designation: For Polish immigrants
- Architect(s): Baldwin and Radziszewski
- Architectural type: Church
- Style: Polish Cathedral style and Romanesque Revival
- Groundbreaking: 1927
- Construction cost: $600,000

Specifications
- Capacity: 2,000
- Materials: Woodstock granite and marble

Holy Rosary Church is a Roman Catholic church located within the Archdiocese of Baltimore in Fells Point, Baltimore, Maryland. It was established to serve Baltimore's Polish community.

Cardinal Karol Wojtyła (later Pope John Paul II) prayed at the shrine during a visit in 1976.

Ronald Pytel was a parish priest at the church whose heart condition was one of the miracles claimed during the canonization of St. Maria Faustina Kowalski in 2000.
