= Curtis Bay, Baltimore =

Curtis Bay
- Neighborhood of Baltimore
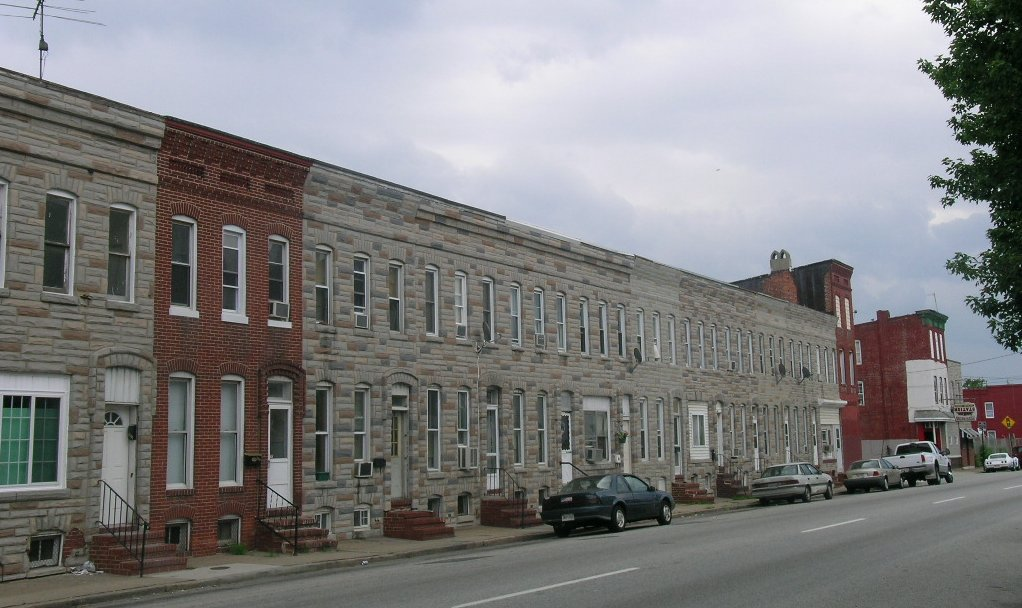
- Row houses on Pennington Avenue

- Location within Baltimore
- Coordinates: 39°13′35″N 76°35′16″W
- Country: United States
- State: Maryland
- City: Baltimore

Curtis Bay is a residential, commercial, and industrial neighborhood in the southern portion of the City of Baltimore, Maryland, United States.

The neighborhood is on steep sloping heights, about four city blocks wide (west to east) and fifteen blocks long (north to south) and above and surrounded on three sides (northeast - east - southeast) in a highly industrialized waterfront area in the southern part of the city, and receives its name from the body (cove) of water to the east in which it sits. The cove of "Curtis Bay" with two small branches - Stone House Cove and Cabin Branch is fed from the southwest by Curtis Creek which in turn is formed further south by Marley Creek and Furnace Branch/Creek in Anne Arundel County. Adjoining nearby to the east is Thoms Cove near Hawkins Point at the north end of the Marley Neck peninsula. Curtis Bay cove itself also has a dredged deep water channel with considerable port facilities and waterfront industries and is a branch of the main stem of the Patapsco River, which forms the extensive frontage of Baltimore Harbor and Port, northwest off of the Chesapeake Bay.

The residential community of Curtis Bay is along three major north–south thoroughfares of Curtis Avenue, Pennington Avenue (Maryland Route 173 on which most commercial businesses are located) and residential Fairhaven Avenue and a partial street of Prudence Street. Running west to east are fifteen smaller residential streets named alphabetically for various types of trees. "The Bay", as it is often called colloquially, also offers a variety of housing, townhouses, rowhouses, individual homes, (both constructed of wood-frame, brick, stone and concrete block/stuccoed) and corner stores, taverns/bars.

Curtis Bay is also home since 1897 to the United States Coast Guard Yard (formerly the U.S. Revenue Cutter Service until 1915) on Hawkins Point Road / extending south from Pennington Avenue (Maryland Route 173) on Arundel Cove off Curtis Creek on the border line with neighboring suburban Anne Arundel County to the south. During the middle and late 19th and early 20th centuries, there was a quarantine station and lazaretto run by the United States Government agency (future U.S. Public Health Service) along Thoms Cove between Sledds Point and Hawkins Point.

There is a large Polish American community in Curtis Bay. The former town hall, real estate office, volunteer fire station, and meeting/assembly hall on the second floor for Curtis Bay was constructed on the heights overlooking the new town and rapidly developing industrial waterfront along Fairview Avenue (now Fairhaven Avenue) facing Filbert Street by a successor developing firm, the South Baltimore Harbor and Improvement Company in 1905. In 1925, the United Polish Societies purchased the building and named it Polish Home Hall and it became central to the Polish ethnic experience in Curtis Bay, functioning as a social, educational, and political center for Curtis Bay's Polish community into the 1970s.

== Air quality ==
A large coal train terminal owned by CSX has been the subject of recent controversy on air quality in Curtis Bay. Many residents have complained about coal particulates layering the community in a grey film. A 2023 collaboration study found that coal particles were found in 100% of the samples throughout the community during 3 rounds of sampling in August, September, and October 2023. Samples were taken near residences, a businesses, a church, a park, and a school up to 3/4 miles away from the train terminal. The study concluded that coal dust found its way into the community daily with the coal dust leaving the terminals fence line approximately every 1.5 hours.

Co-collaborators for the study included Community of Curtis Bay Association (CCBA), South Baltimore Community Land Trust (SBCLT), Mt. Winans Community Association, SB7 Coalition, Air and Radiation Administration at the Maryland Department of the Environment, Department of Environmental Health & Engineering at Johns Hopkins Bloomberg School of Public Health, and Department of Atmospheric and Oceanic Science at the University of Maryland.
