= Canton, Baltimore =

Canton
- Neighborhood of Baltimore
- Interactive map of Canton
- Country: United States
- State: Maryland
- City: Baltimore

Population (2010)
  - Total: 10,826
  - Density: 13,802/sq mi (5,329/km^{2})
- Demonym: Cantonite
- Time zone: UTC-5 (Eastern)
  - Summer (DST): EDT
- ZIP code: 21224
- Area code: 410, 443, and 667
- Canton Historic District
- U.S. National Register of Historic Places
- U.S. Historic district
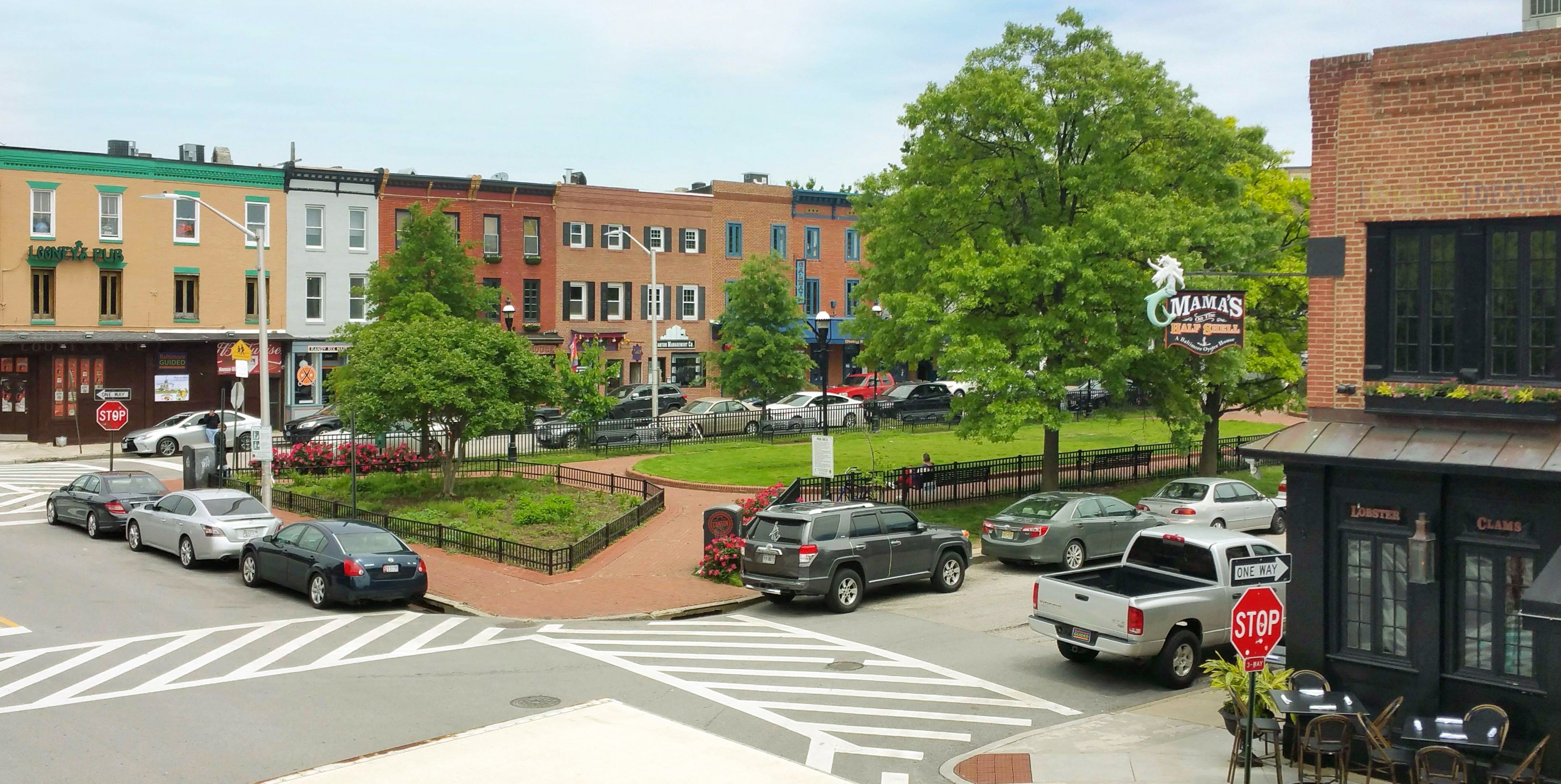
- O'Donnell Square

- Location within Baltimore Location within Maryland Location within the United States
- Location: Eastern Ave. and Waterfront, Conkling, and Chester Sts., Baltimore, Maryland
- Coordinates: 39°16′53″N 76°34′34″W
- Area: 350 acres (140 ha)
- Built: 1828
- Architect: Multiple
- Architectural style: Late 19th And 20th Century Revivals, Late Victorian
- NRHP reference No.: 80001784
- Added to NRHP: January 29, 1980

Canton is a historic waterfront neighborhood in Baltimore, Maryland, United States. The neighborhood is along Baltimore's outer harbor in the southeastern section of the city, roughly 2 miles (3 km) east of Baltimore's downtown district and next to or near the neighborhoods of Patterson Park, Fell's Point, Highlandtown, and Brewers Hill.

Canton is considered one of Baltimore's trendiest and vibrant neighborhoods, known for its family-friendly community, urban lifestyle and hot spot for the social scene. The inclusive neighborhood continues to see rapid growth as more development opportunities come into the area. Since the late 1990s, the neighborhood has undergone significant gentrification and has been ranked the 16th most-gentrified zip code in the nation from 2000 to 2016.

== History ==
=== Before 1785 ===
For several hundred years before 1608, the land including Canton is likely in the geographic sphere of influence of the ancestors of the contemporary Piscataway Peoples. The area that is now Canton, east and south of the Fall Line, would be used for fishing and cultivation. In 1608, John Smith reported the area to be uninhabited, but this is thought to be due to recent conflict with the Massawomeck people from the north. In 1652, the Susquehannocks are forced to cede their control over the land between the Patuxent and Susquehanna rivers, including what is now Baltimore and Canton. In 1782, the borders of what would become Canton are defined on the west side when Baltimore City annexes the area west of Harris Creek.

=== 1785-1828 ===
In 1785, Irish merchant and slave owner John O'Donnell settled in Baltimore after arriving on the ship "Pallas" from Calcutta and the Chinese port of Guangzhou, then called Canton by English speakers. When O'Donnell purchased land, he named his plantation Canton. When O'Donnell died in 1805, the probate inventory of his estate includes 48 enslaved persons, including several infants, with their name, race, age, sex, dollar valuation, and other notes. On April 5, 2021, after a successful campaign by neighborhood groups, O'Donnell's statue was removed.

A major feature of early Canton was Major David Stodder's shipyard, located at Harris Creek, with the most famous vessel built being the USS Constellation in 1797.

In 1825, The Erie canal is completed, opening up new competition for Baltimore in trade and commerce.

=== 1828-1966 ===
In the beginning of the 19th century, O'Donnell's land was sold off by his son Columbus O’Donnell, William Patterson and Peter Cooper, and was developed by the Canton Company for the waterfront industry and blue-collar housing.

During the early 19th century, European immigrants settled in the area. Welsh immigrants, primarily workers from South Wales, began settling in Baltimore in large numbers beginning in the 1820s. Welsh and Irish migrant workers composed a large portion of Baltimore's working class during the early and mid-1800s. In 1850, a large community of copper workers from Wales settled in the neighborhood. These workers established a Presbyterian church in 1865, located on Toone Street in Canton. Subsequent groups of immigrants have included Germans, Poles and Ukrainians. On a Residential Security Map in 1937, most of the Canton neighborhood is classified as D/Fourth Grade (redlined), or classified industrial, along with the majority of central Baltimore. In 1957, Baltimore's Harbor Tunnel opens, connecting East Baltimore to South Baltimore and eliminating the "Baltimore Bottleneck" from Philadelphia and The South. At 1.4 miles long, 17.6 miles including approaches, it costs $144 million to build and is the longest twin-tube trench tunnel in the world when it opens.

On July 19, 1960, The Canton Company becomes a wholly owned subsidiary of International Mining Co.

=== 1966–present ===
As a part of the urban renewal highway plan for Baltimore City, in January 1966 the Baltimore City Council passed a condemnation bill for the construction of I-83 along the Boston Street, which would have cut the neighborhood off from the waterfront.

By 1960, in hopes of making irreversible progress toward that goal, Baltimore City demolishes 215 houses between Boston and Elliott Streets and Linwood and Lakewood Avenues. Gloria Aull and Barbara Mikulski starts the Southeast Council Against the Road (SCAR) to protest construction of the East-West Expressway through Canton, Fells Point, Federal Hill, and other communities. Mikulski is elected to the City Council in 1971, and this effort to stop the highway is ultimately successful.

In 1980, the Canton Historic District is added to the National Register of Historic Places. Later that year, the statue of John O'Donnell that was later removed was installed, after Baltimore City paid local artist Tilden Streett $20,000 for the commission.

Starting with the Anchorage Townhouses in 1984 and continuing through the 2000s, as industry moved out, new housing and marinas have been developed along the waterfront and gentrification of the existing housing has occurred further inland. In 1990, Canton Waterfront Park and the Korean War Memorial are dedicated, replacing a railroad yard and cargo pier, closed many years prior, of which a car float is the only remaining structure. The Korean War Memorial incorrectly shows the border of North and South Korea at the 38th parallel instead of the DMZ, but the designer of the map, Dr. Randall Beirne of UMB, declines to correct the error.

Canton's role in resisting integration and public housing in the 20th century was well-documented, up to a 1992 public meeting that shut down plans to add an affordable housing project after over 700 residents "shout down City officials" presenting the proposal. A highly circulated flier before the event claimed untruthfully that the city was building a "high rise housing project" that would "destroy your property value and fill Highlandtown with the drugs, crime, and violence."

Urban renewal continued in the 21st century, with the demolition of a former oil refinery operated by ExxonMobil. The site of the oil refinery has been home to The Shops at Canton Crossing since October 2013, anchored by Target, Harris Teeter, Kneads, and Wonder Food Hall. Canton is home to a section of the planned Red Line along Boston Street to when it would turn North toward Hopkins Bayview. Development along the path of the proposed line, after it is shut down by Governor Larry Hogan in 2015, has left the future path of the Red Line unclear (as of July 2024) after its revival in 2023.

== Boundaries ==
Canton is bounded by Patterson Park and Eastern Ave to the north, Chester Street to the west, the waterfront to the south, and Conkling Street to the east. The streets are laid out in a uniform north to south and east to west directions, with the major exception of Boston Street, which runs along the Patapsco River waterfront.

== Transportation ==
Canton is conveniently situated with easy access to Interstate 95, Interstate 895 and Boston Street and Eastern Avenues, which provide major surface routes to downtown Baltimore. Two high-frequency MTA bus lines (Gold and Navy) service Canton for direct access to the central business district and Penn Station. The south waterfront area provides a water taxi link to Locust Point.

Bus transportation to New York City and Washington, D.C., is available with frequent service at a nearby Eastern Bus stop on Ponca Street.

== Landmarks ==
Many of the structures are included in the Canton Historic District, listed on the National Register of Historic Places in 1980.

Canton's traditional center is O'Donnell Square, a small park bordered on the north and south by O'Donnell Street, to the east by South Potomac Street, and to the west by Linwood Avenue. O'Donnell Square is home to a number of lively bars and restaurants, gift shops, salons and other small businesses, as well as residences. Canton is also immediately adjacent to Patterson Park, a popular nearby attraction for local residents. In the 2000s, developments have added focus areas to the neighborhood, including the Canton Waterfront Park and Maryland Korean War Memorial, the rehabilitated American Can Company building, the Du Burns Soccer Arena, two marinas, a public boat launch, and new bars and restaurants. The Canton Dog Park, the first off-leash dog park in Baltimore, has been open for dog lovers since 2002.

The neighborhood is home to the many food and wine festivals, Light Night Canton, Baltimore's annual Ukrainian-American festival, summer concert series, and is a popular destination to view Baltimore Harbor July 4th fireworks. A premier shopping complex, The Shops at Canton Crossing, anchored by Target and Nordstrom Rack, has been serving local residents since 2013.

Notable churches in the area include the St. Casimir (Roman Catholic) Church, built c. 1926, the St. Michael the Archangel Ukrainian Catholic Church, and the (Episcopal) Church on the Square.

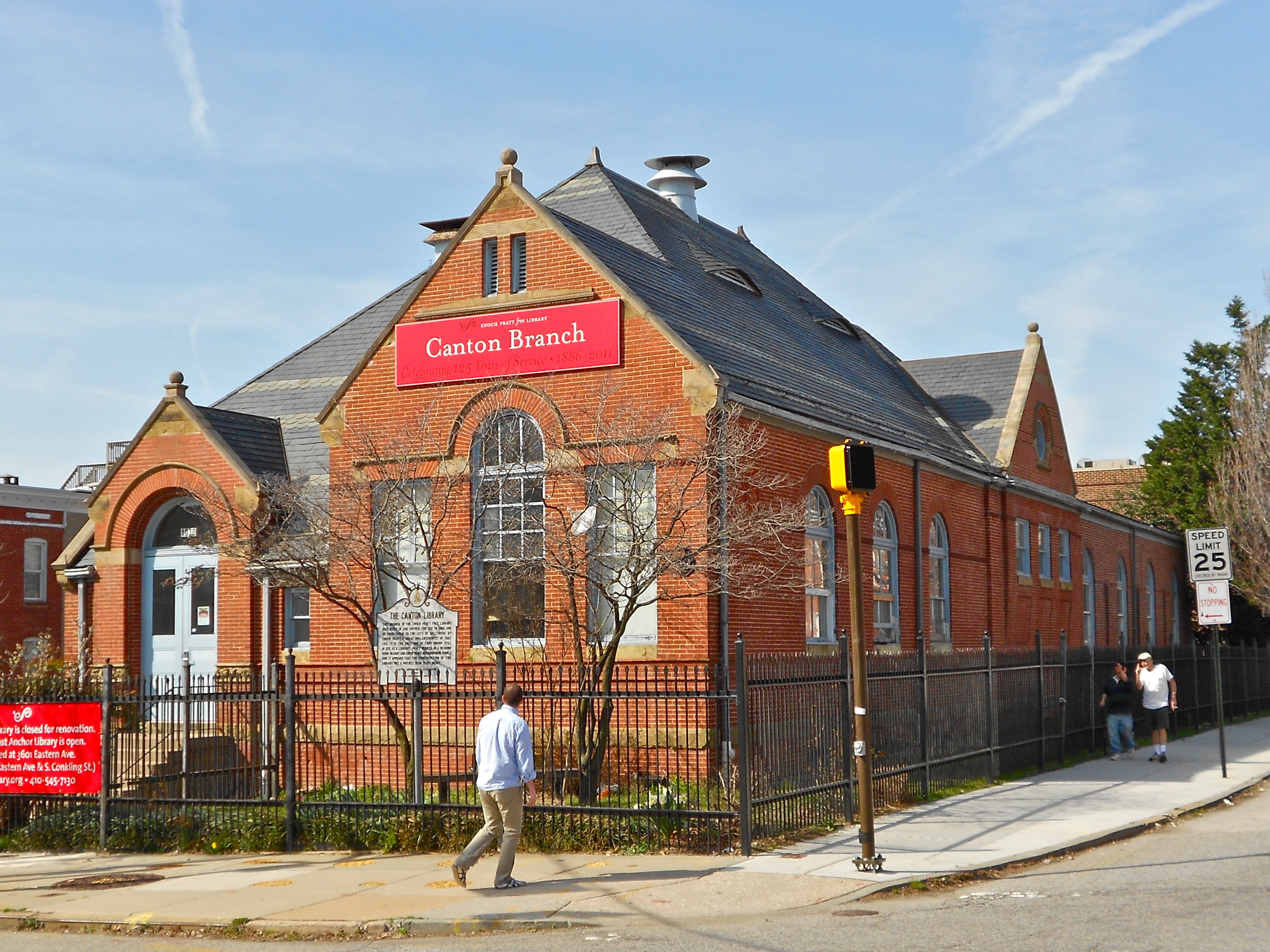
Enoch Pratt Free Library branch

Canton's branch of the Enoch Pratt Free Library, Baltimore's first and in operation since 1866, is centrally located on O’Donnell Square.

A moored trash interceptor, the female-gendered Professor Trash Wheel (with appropriate googly eyes) can be found off the Boston Street Pier Park since December 2016.

== Housing stock ==
Most houses in Canton are turn-of-the-20th-century two to three-story rowhouses. Some homes closer to the waterfront date from the Civil War and many are well-preserved despite their age. New townhouses have recently been built at O'Donnell Square and throughout the neighborhood, replacing some of the previous stock. There are also luxury waterfront apartments and condominiums in recently rehabilitated industrial buildings. According to the Baltimore Neighborhood Indicators Alliance, the median price of homes sold in 2023 was $361,000.

== Demographics ==
Based on data derived from the census of 2020, there were 10,589 people living in the neighborhood, with a median age of 36.2 years. As of 2023, Canton has with the highest percentage population 25 to 64 years (75.8%) among all neighborhoods in Baltimore. The racial makeup of Canton was 84.2% White, 5.6% Asian, 4.6% of Mixed Race, 4.2% Black, 0.1% Native American, and 0.8% from other races. The median household income in 2023 was $165,282, the highest of all Baltimore neighborhoods. 88.1% of the working-age population is employed, 3.0% is unemployed, both rates highest and lowest, respectively, among all Baltimore neighborhoods.
