= Norman Einspruch =

American engineer

Norman G. Einspruch is a professor and dean emeritus at the University of Miami College of Engineering. He attended Rice University, the University of Colorado, and Brown University in the 1950s. He was the dean of the University of Miami College of Engineering from 1977 to 1990. He is an elected fellow of the American Association for the Advancement of Science.
