= Butchers Hill, Baltimore =

Historic house in Maryland, United States

- Butchers Hill Historic District
- U.S. National Register of Historic Places
- U.S. Historic district
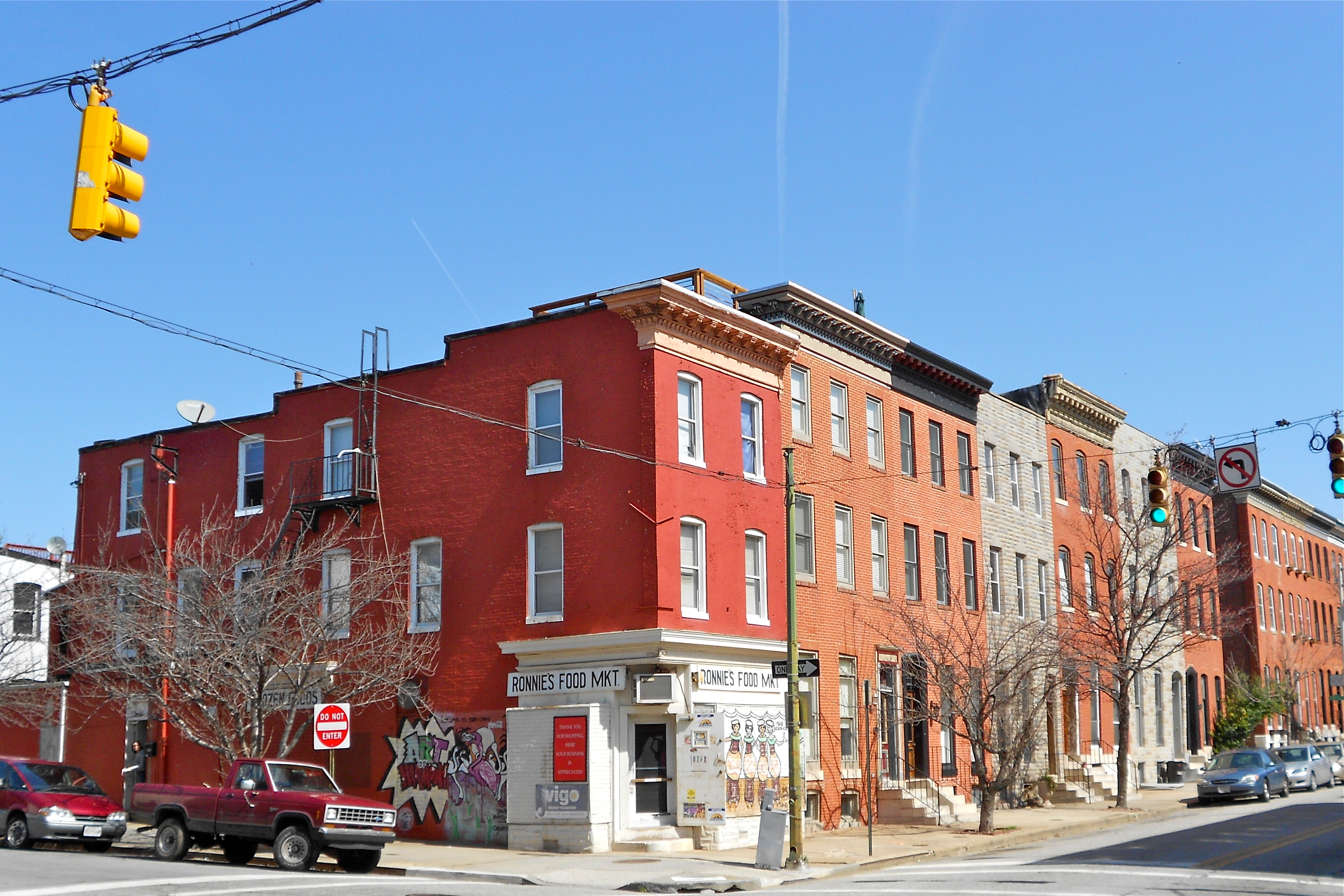
- The corner of Chester and Pratt Streets, March 2012

- Location within Baltimore Location within Maryland Location within the United States
- Location: Roughly Bounded by Patterson Park Ave., Fayette, Pratt, Chapel, Washington, and Chester Sts., Baltimore, Maryland
- Coordinates: 39°17′29″N 76°35′13″W
- Area: 57 acres (23 ha)
- Architectural style: Late Victorian
- NRHP reference No.: 82001582
- Added to NRHP: December 28, 1982

Butchers Hill is a neighborhood in Southeast Baltimore, Maryland, United States. It is north of Fells Point, east of Washington Hill, and northwest of Patterson Park. It is south of Fayette Street, west of Patterson Park Avenue, north of Pratt Street, and east of Washington Street. It is in the 21231 zip code.

Established as a village before the Civil War, Butchers Hill was once home to butchers and poultry preparers, many of them German American and Jewish American. It was once more affluent than nearby Fells Point, as reflected in its generally larger rowhouses. Butchers Hill is near more gentrified sections of Fells Point, Patterson Park, and Johns Hopkins Hospital. A portion of it is a historic district listed on the National Register of Historic Places.

== History ==
Unlike most Baltimore neighborhoods, which developed as outgrowth from areas near the harbor, streams, or water mills, or as cross-roads trading settlements, Butchers Hill was long a geographically isolated and prosperous trading village.

The area had been home to humans for thousands of years when the first people of European heritage arrived in the 17th century. In 1667, Quinton Parker and his fiancé, Mary Onley, claimed a 100-acre tract of land in the area, though they soon conveyed it to John Kemp, who used it as a plantation. Kemp sold it in 1683, to Nicholas Rogers, who built a house and was the first person of European heritage to live in the area. Nicholas's son, William, inherited the land and began to develop it. By 1776, the neighborhood area was known as Hampstead Hill, potentially after the similarly hilly Hampstead Heath in London. William's son, Benjamin, fell into debt, and the land was sold at sheriff's auction to Irish American shipping magnate William Patterson. Patterson never lived in the area, but he and his family are primarily responsible for the area's development in the 1800s. Patterson leased land to butcher and innkeeper Jacob Loundenslager. Until 1835, the area was known as "Loundenslager's Hill."

Over time, other butchers, poultry preparers, and tanners moved in, many of whom were German and/or Jewish. The city would not allow them in other neighborhoods and kept them on the outskirts due to the objectionable nature of their professions and often unpleasant odors. Eventually, the neighborhood was renamed for their line of work.

Frederick Douglass wrote that when he first arrived in Baltimore in 1826 as an 8-year-old enslaved child named Fred Bailey, he stepped off a sloop from Talbot County at Smith's Wharf and was instructed to take a flock of sheep to Butchers Hill.

During the Civil War, the area prospered. Patterson Park was used for Union encampment and military hospitals. Butchers in the area provided meat to the Union troops and prospered financially. One such butcher was Jacob J. Blankard, who built a mansion in the area that is now known as the Blankard-Gunther House.

Development of Butchers Hill intensified after the Civil War. Previously, there had been freestanding homes and slaughterhouses, but by 1865, those were gone and the area was redeveloped. The redeveloped area is distinct from other Baltimore neighborhoods because individual homes were built at different times by different people, which provided the area with a variety of unique architectural styles and less uniformity that other neighborhoods with row housing. Instead of large blocks of rowhouses like in other neighborhoods, development in Butchers Hill progressed in more modest efforts of small clusters at a time. Butchers Hill also has larger homes built by particularly affluent residents. Construction of the buildings largely occurred between 1850 and 1915.

By the mid-1920s, the last of the butchers had moved and the neighborhood was largely home to immigrants. From the 1920s to the 1940s, Butchers Hill was a thriving Jewish neighborhood home to dentists, doctors, lawyers and merchants. Synagogues and social clubs were established. The Blankard-Gunther House became for a while a Jewish home for indigent people. Residences were converted to include storefronts.

During World War II, the neighborhood experienced decline. Because of its proximity to large defense plants in southeastern Baltimore, the population exploded with many larger homes being subdivided into multiple small apartments to accommodate more workers. In the post-war years, like many urban areas nationally, there was disinvestment, the suburbs attracted many city dwellers, and the Jewish residents of Butchers Hill largely moved to the northwest portion of Baltimore. They were replaced primarily by poorer people, especially internal migrants from Appalachia.

In the 1970s, there were urban revitalization efforts, which were mostly sensitive to the historic nature of Butchers Hill. The Butchers Hill Association was established in the 1970s. In the 1980s, the neighborhood was listed in the National Register of Historic Places. For a while, the neighborhood's name had fallen into disfavor and was just referred to as "East Baltimore" or the area around Patterson Park. A real estate marketing effort, however, resurrected the "Butchers Hill" name, which is still used.

Today, Butcher's Hill is a prosperous neighborhood. The neighborhood is popular among young professionals, artists, and students, residents, and staff at the nearby Johns Hopkins School of Medicine and Johns Hopkins Hospital. It is one of the neighborhoods where full-time employees of Johns Hopkins may apply for "Live Near Your Work" grants toward down payments on homes.

== Demographics ==
As of the census of 2010, there were 1,967 people living in the neighborhood. The racial makeup of Butchers Hill was 51.9% White, 25.4% African American, 3.3% Native American, 2.6% Asian, 3.4% from other races, and 2.6% from two or more races. Hispanic or Latino of any race were 16.7% of the population. 43.6% of occupied housing units were owner-occupied. 24.6% of housing units were vacant. Butchers Hill is a popular neighborhood for students from the nearby Johns Hopkins medical campus.

74.6% of the population were employed, 2.3% were unemployed, and 23.1% were not in the labor force. The median household income was $36,636. About 23.9% of families and 23.5% of the population were below the poverty line.

Butchers Hill is home to many Irish-Americans, Polish-Americans, and Ukrainian-Americans, as well as African-Americans, Lumbee Native Americans, and a growing Hispanic and Latino population.

== In popular culture ==
In 1999, the third book of Laura Lippman's series focusing on Baltimore detective, Tess Monaghan, was entitled Butchers Hill, in which Monaghan has an office in the neighborhood. The neighborhood described as having had a prosperous past with beautiful homes, but is currently lower income and plagued by crime.
