= The Horse You Came In On Saloon =

- Interactive map of The Horse You Came In On Saloon

Restaurant information
- Established: 1972
- Location: Maryland
- Coordinates: 39.28151°N 76.59417°W

The Horse You Came In On Saloon, popularly known as The Horse, is a bar established in 1972 in Fell's Point, Baltimore, Maryland. The bar's predecessor, The fountain inn first opened for business in 1775.

The Horse erroneously claims to be the last place Edgar Allan Poe was seen at before his delirium and sudden death.

== History ==
The Horse was built as the fountain inn in 1775. It is a watering hole in the historic port of Fell’s Point, and the establishment catered to miscreants, sailors and shipbuilders. Howard Gerber won at Pimlico Race Course and bought the establishment in 1972. He renamed it into the Horse You Came In On Saloon. Gerber also forced a friend to dress as a cowboy and ride a horse into the building on his first day of business.

In 2006, The Horse was sold in an auction to Eric Mathias and Spiros Korologos.

== Attraction ==
The Horse has gone through renovations throughout the years but the owners managed to maintain its theme, especially with the saddle-shaped seats. The bar at the front entrance of the colonial-era building is the authentic 18th century saloon. The owners eventually expanded by replacing the horse stable area with brand new bars.

The Horse is also known for their programs, such as the Jack Daniels Bottle Club, where regular customers may buy and store a bottle of the whiskey brand at the saloon until fully consumed.

The Horse is often cited as the last place Edgar Allan Poe was seen at before his delirium and sudden death. There is a designated seat in the bar marked Poe’s Last Stop.
