= National Slavic Museum =

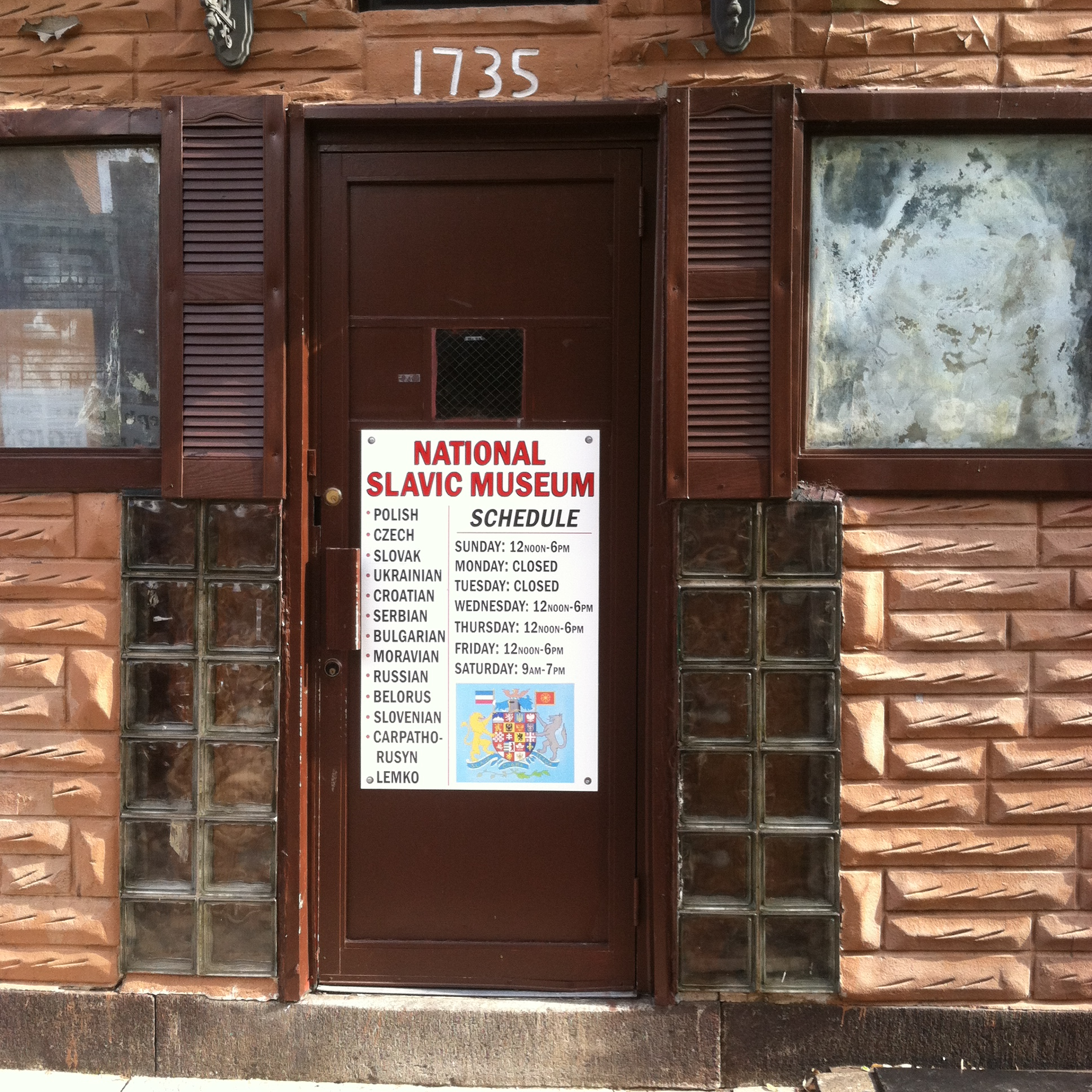
- National Slavic Museum, June 2014.

- Location within Baltimore National Slavic Museum (Maryland) National Slavic Museum (the United States)
- Established: 2012
- Location: 1735 Fleet Street, Baltimore, Maryland, United States
- Coordinates: 39.284492°N 76.591889°W
- Type: Ethnic museum

The National Slavic Museum in Fell's Point, Baltimore is a museum dedicated to the documentation of the Polish and Slavic heritage of Baltimore, including Baltimore's Belarusian, Bulgarian, Carpatho-Rusyn, Croatian, Czech, Lemko, Moravian, Russian, Serbian, Slovak, Slovene, and Ukrainian heritage.

== See also ==
- History of the Czechs in Baltimore
- History of the Poles in Baltimore
- History of the Russians in Baltimore
- History of the Ukrainians in Baltimore
