= Russian Night School of Baltimore =

Defunct school in Baltimore, Maryland, US

Coordinates: 39.2914°N 76.6006°W

- Founded: 1889
- Type: Russian-Jewish educational institution
- Location: Baltimore, Maryland, United States
- Region served: Baltimore

The Russian Night School of Baltimore was a night school that served the educational needs of Russian and Eastern European Jewish immigrants living in Baltimore. Located at 1208 East Baltimore Street, the school was founded by the Zionist activist Henrietta Szold. The school was open for a decade, closing in 1898 after the City of Baltimore agreed to open public night schools for immigrants. 5,000 students were educated at the Russian Night School. The school left a lasting impression on American education, being an early example of an educational institution offering English as a Second Language (ESL) classes.

== See also ==
- History of the Jews in Baltimore
- History of Russians in Baltimore
