= Washington Hill, Baltimore =

Washington Hill
- Neighborhood of Baltimore
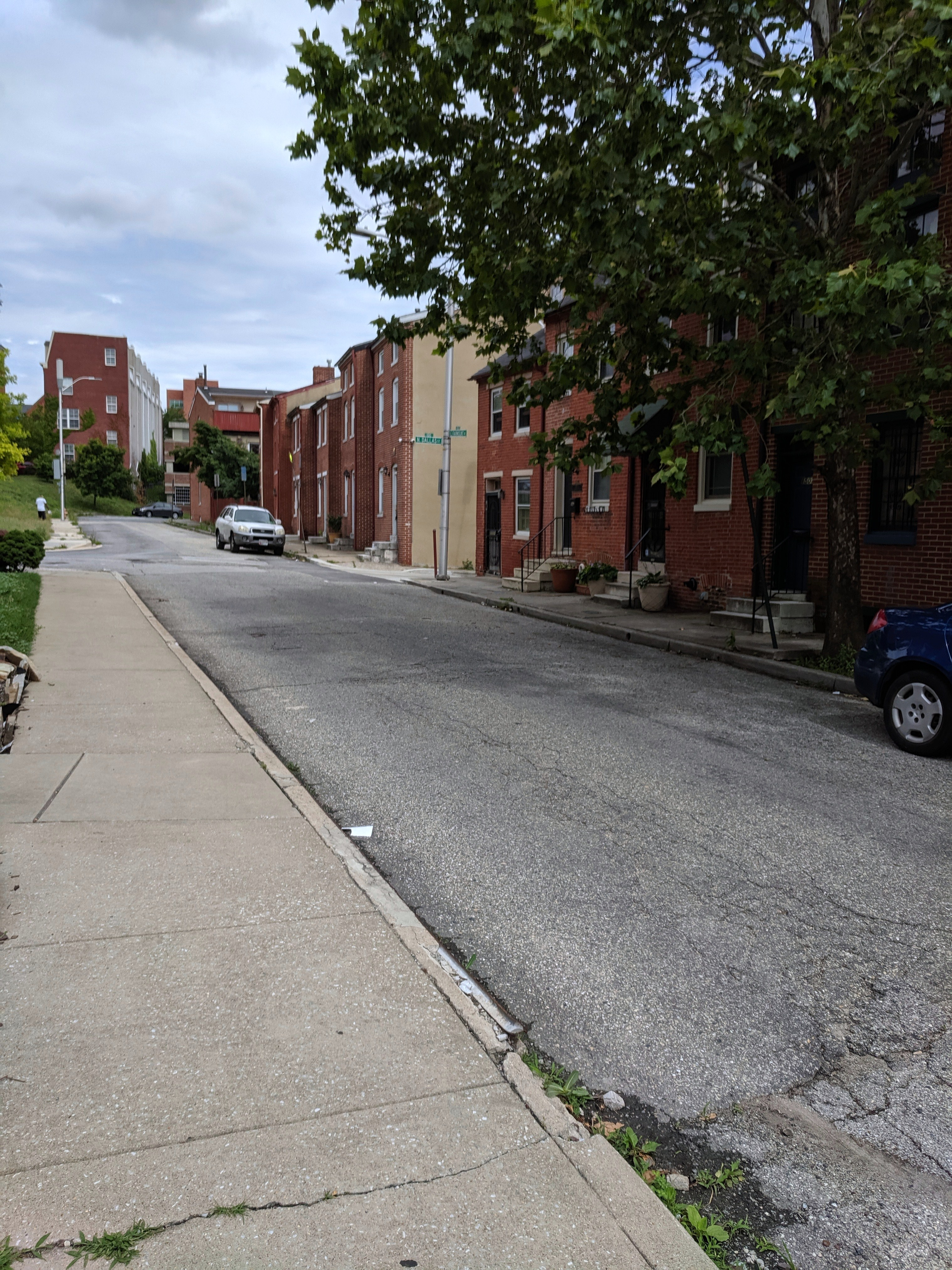

- Location within Baltimore
- Coordinates: 39°17′31.6″N 76°35′37.6″W
- Country: United States
- State: Maryland
- City: Baltimore
- Time zone: UTC-5 (Eastern)
  - Summer (DST): EDT
- Area code: 410, 443, and 667

Washington Hill is a neighborhood in Baltimore, Maryland, United States. It is north of Fells Point, south of Johns Hopkins Hospital, east of Old Town and Jonestown and west of Butchers Hill. It is bounded by Fayette Street, Washington Street, Lombard Street, and Central Avenue. The neighborhood surrounds Broadway (formerly known as Market Street in Colonial times) running north from Fells Point to terminate at East North Avenue and is named for the now-defunct Washington Medical College later known as the Church Home and Hospital on Broadway where famed writer/poet Edgar Allan Poe was taken to die in 1849 after being found comatose in a downtown Baltimore street. In the median strip of Broadway is a statue of seven-term mayor of Baltimore, Ferdinand Claiborne Latrobe.

City Springs School, a charter school for the Baltimore Curriculum Project, is located in Washington Hill. City Springs was the second school in Baltimore City history to be removed from the state's "recon list" of failing schools. Fairmount Heights Vocational High School (now closed) is in the area. Also nearby is City Springs Park, which contains recreational facilities.

== Demographics ==
As of the census of 2010, there were 7,937 people living in the neighborhood. The racial makeup of Washington Hill was 29.1% White, 57.2% African American, 1.3% Native American, 2.2% Asian, 3.1% from other races, and 2.2% from two or more races. Hispanic or Latino of any race were 11.3% of the population. 34.0% of occupied housing units were owner-occupied. 10.0% of housing units were vacant.

Washington Hill is home to many descendants of Irish, Czech, Russian, and Polish immigrants, as well as Appalachian people and Lumbee Native Americans.

60.0% of the population were employed, 7.7% were unemployed, and 31.9% were not in the labor force. The median household income was $36,138. About 16.3% of families and 23.8% of the population were below the poverty line.

=== Urban Redevelopment ===
In 1974 Citizens for Washington Hill was established as a federal and city sponsored organization to create a revitalization plan for the community. Betty Hyatt became the leader of the community organization that subsequently led the development of artists housing and studios in the 1500 and 1600 blocks of East Baltimore St, the renovation of a significant number of blocks of housing throughout the neighborhood, and the creation of Washington Hill Mutual Homes, a very successful community housing cooperative. With over 200 resident-owned dwellings that dominate Broadway and the blocks of East Fairmount and East Baltimore Streets, the development has been a model for community-led urban housing development having been visited by Prince Charles of England and President Jimmy Carter.
