= Holy Trinity Russian Orthodox Church (Baltimore) =

Coordinates: 39.2927897°N 76.5925772°W

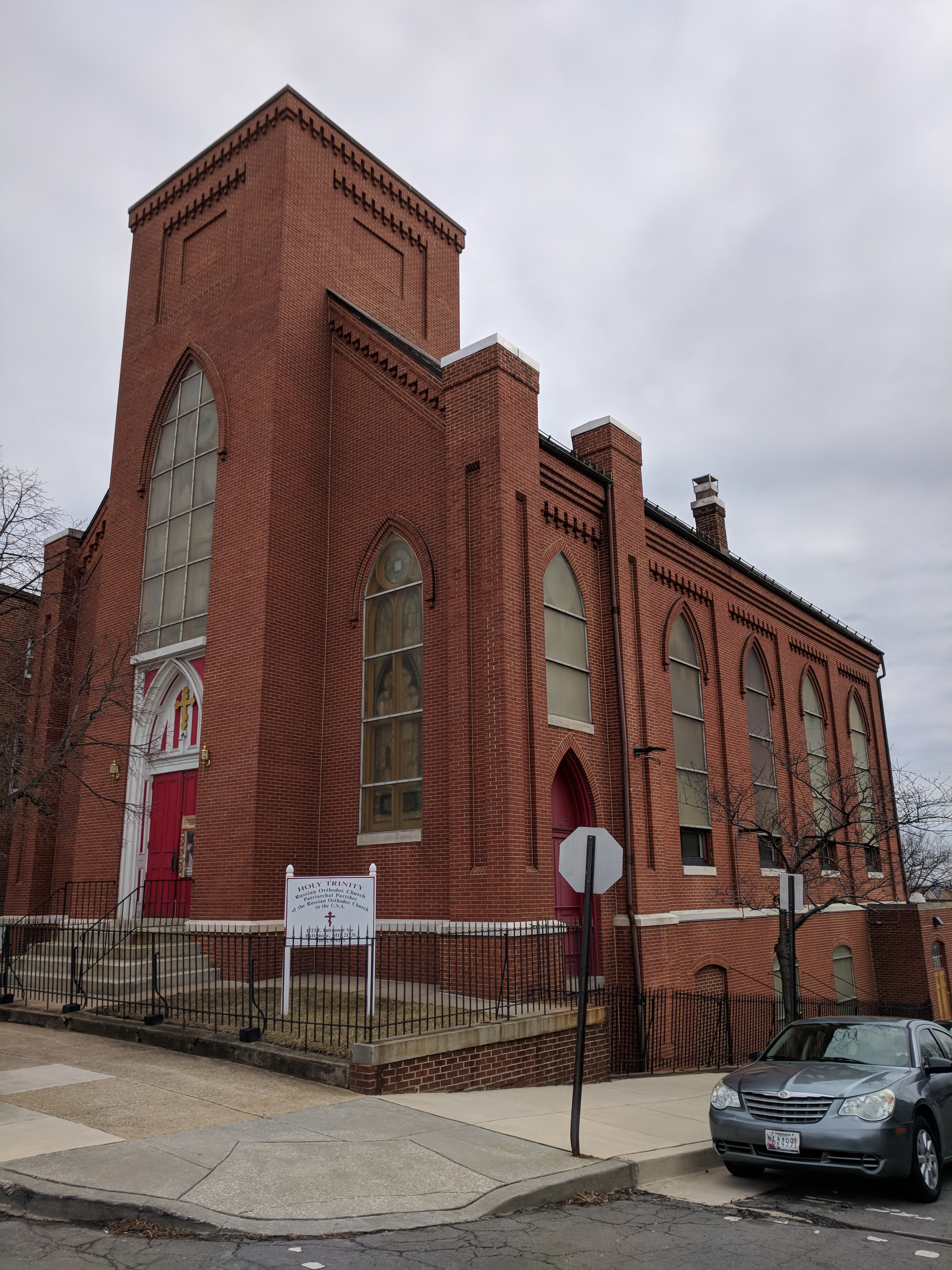

- Location: 1723 East Fairmount Avenue, Baltimore, Maryland
- Country: United States
- Denomination: Russian Orthodox
- Website: Holy Trinity Russian Orthodox Church

History
- Founded: February 9, 1919
- Founder: Russian immigrants

Architecture
- Functional status: Active
- Heritage designation: For Russian immigrants
- Architectural type: Church

Holy Trinity Russian Orthodox Church is a church of the Patriarchal Parishes in the USA of the Russian Orthodox Church, located in the Dunbar neighborhood of Baltimore, Maryland. The church was founded by ethnic Russian immigrants from Belarus.

== History ==
The founders of Holy Trinity were ethnic Russians and Russian-speakers who immigrated from the Russian Empire, including areas that are now Belarus, Poland, and Ukraine. The church building was constructed sometime before or after the Civil War to serve a Methodist congregation. During the 1890s, the church building was acquired by Lutherans and served as a Lutheran church until it was purchased by the Russian émigré community on February 9, 1919. The attendance started to decline in numbers after the 1930s due to many Russian-Americans in Baltimore moving to the suburbs, leaving a smaller, aging congregation.

More recent members of the church have largely been immigrants from Eastern European and Central Asian countries of the former Soviet Union, the majority of parishioners being Russians, Ukrainians, Belarusians, Georgians, Romanians, Uzbeks, and Tajiks. Other members of the church include Black Americans and white Americans as well. At least 10 different languages are spoken by parishioners.

The church holds an annual Russian Festival in order to celebrate Baltimore's Russian heritage.

== See also ==
- List of churches in Baltimore
- Russian Orthodox Church Outside Russia
