= Zenon Mazurkevich =

Ukrainian-American architect (1939–2018)

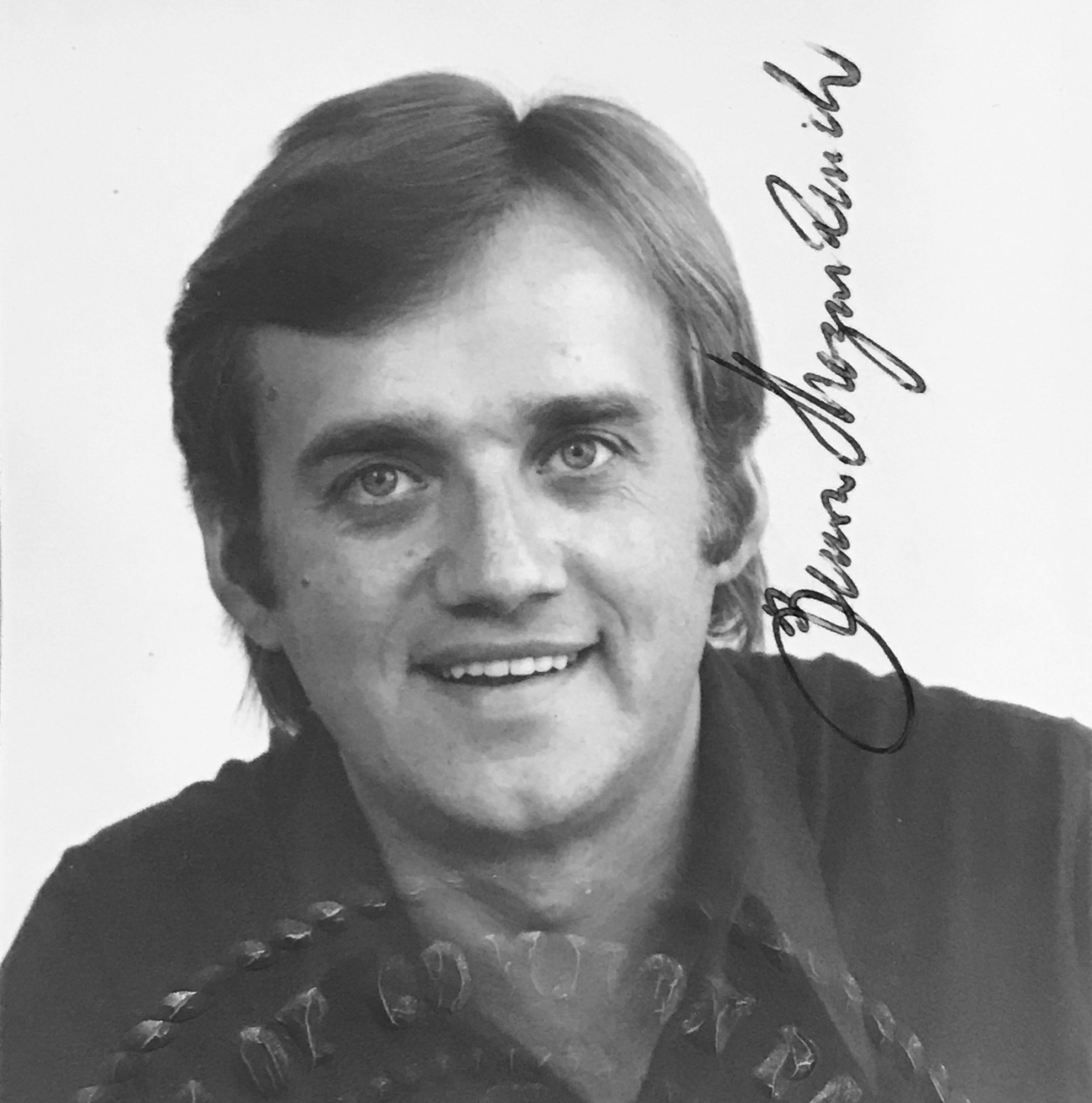
- Born: August 31, 1939; Ivano-Frankivsk, Ukraine
- Died: October 26, 2018 (aged 79); Philadelphia, U.S.
- Education: University of Pennsylvania
- Occupation: Architect
- Spouse: Ulana Baluch Mazurkevich
- Children: 2
- Buildings: St. Joseph the Betrothed Ukrainian Greek Catholic Church; St. Michael the Archangel Ukrainian Catholic Church

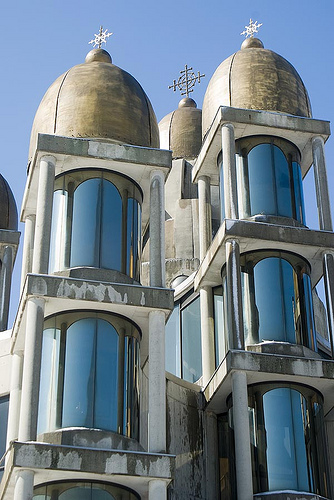
St. Joseph the Betrothed Ukrainian Catholic Church designed by Zenon Mazurkevich.

Zenon Mazurkevich (August 31, 1939 – October 26, 2018) was a Ukrainian-American architect known for his church architecture, in particular the St. Joseph the Betrothed Ukrainian Catholic Church.

== Early life and education ==
He was born in the town of Rozhniativ in the Ivano-Frankivsk region of Ukraine. He emigrated with his parents to Germany and then to Canada. He graduated from the University of Toronto with a degree in architecture in 1966. He received master's degrees in architecture and in city planning from the University of Pennsylvania, Graduate School of Fine Arts in 1972.

== Career ==
At the beginning of his career, Mazurkevich worked for Ludwig Mies van der Rohe, as well as the architectural firm of Skidmore Owings and Merrill, where he was involved with the design of the 100-story John Hancock Center in Chicago, Illinois. He later opened up his own firm in Philadelphia, Pennsylvania, where he pursued his passion in religious architecture.

His most prominent architectural work is St. Joseph the Betrothed Ukrainian Catholic Church in Chicago, Illinois. Three-quarters of the Church's exterior consists of curved windows. It was one of the largest bent-glass projects in the country at that time. When it was built, local press commented that its futuristic design looked “like a product of a cosmic collision between 12th Century Russia and 21st Century Mars.” The church has been cited by architectural experts as one of the most beautiful buildings in Chicago, and one of the most beautiful churches in America.

Mazurkevich's other projects included St. Michael the Archangel Ukrainian Catholic Church in Baltimore, Maryland, which he designed in the Cossack Baroque style, the Prayer Room at St. Basil Academy in Fox Chase, Pennsylvania, the Order of St. Basils Monastery in Glen Cove, New York, renovations of St. Nicholas Ukrainian Catholic Cathedral in Chicago, Illinois, as well as an avant-garde design for the Cathedral of the Transfiguration of our Lord, in Kolomyia, Ukraine.

== Personal life ==
He married human-rights activist and restaurateur Ulana Baluch Mazurkevich, and had two sons.

== Gallery ==
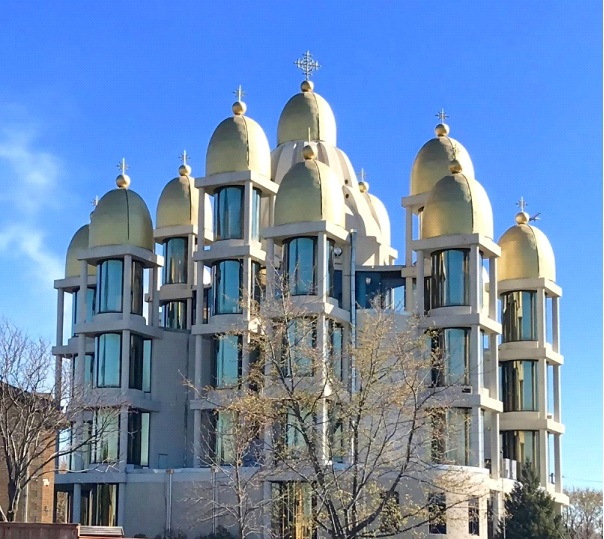
St. Joseph the Betrothed Ukrainian Catholic Church (Chicago, United States)

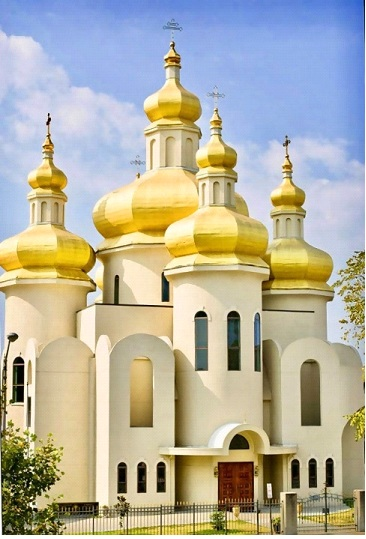
St. Michael the Archangel Ukrainian Catholic Church (Baltimore, United States)

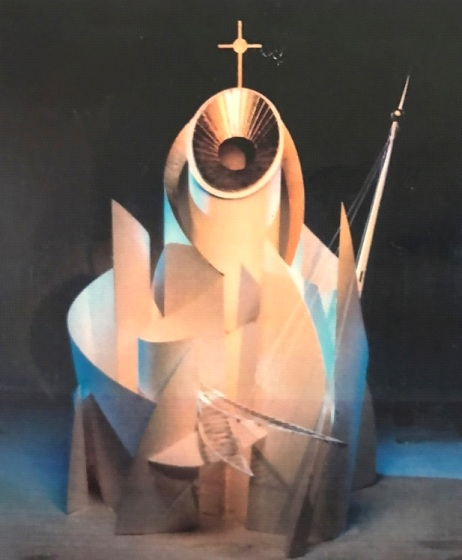
Design for Cathedral of the Transfiguration of our Lord (Kolomyia, Ukraine)
