= St. Michael the Archangel Ukrainian Catholic Church =

Coordinates: 39.285739°N 76.582583°W

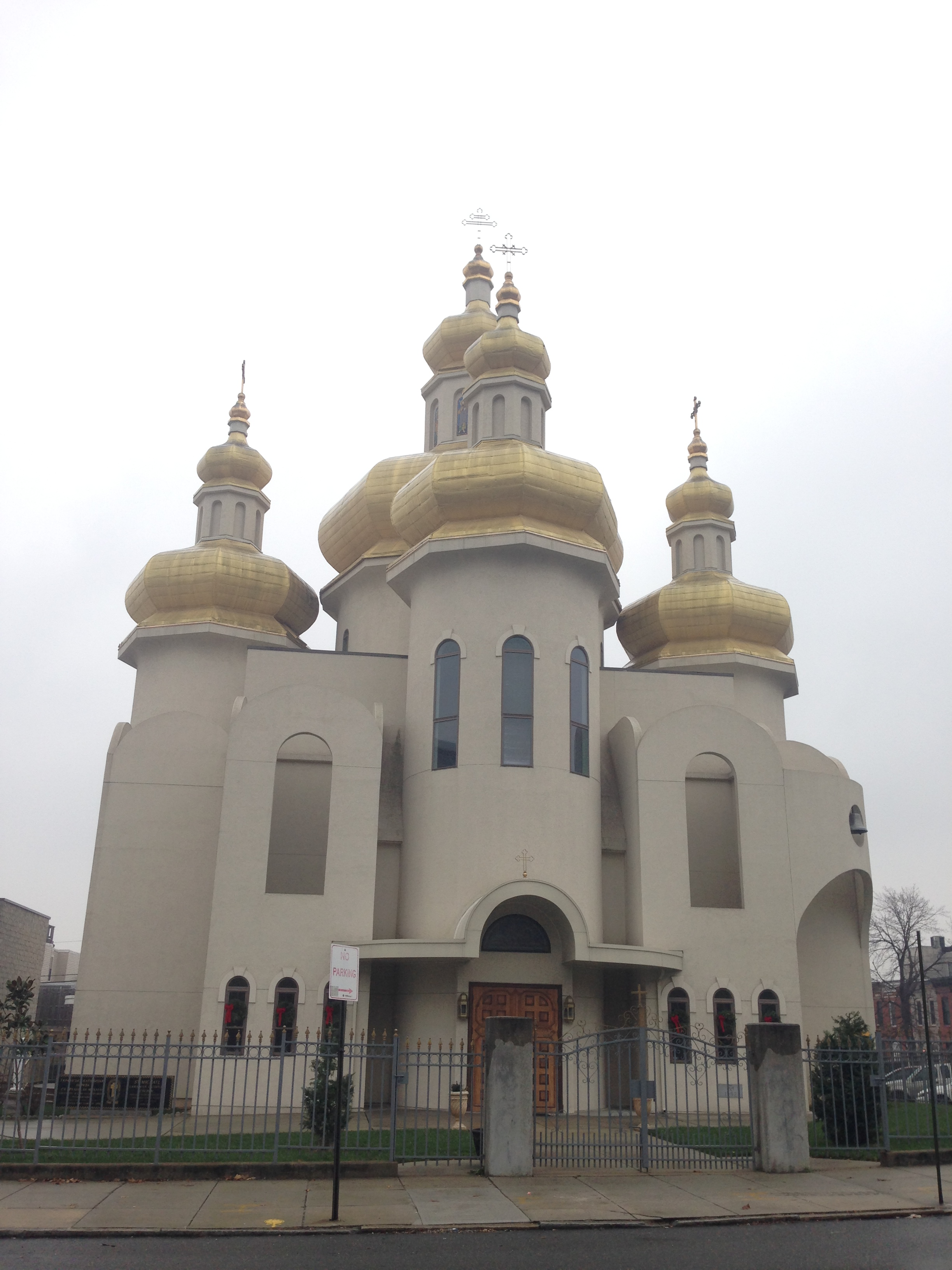
- St. Michael the Archangel Ukrainian Catholic Church.

- Location: Baltimore
- Country: United States
- Denomination: Ukrainian Catholic
- Website: Church website

History
- Founded: November 1872
- Founder: Ukrainian immigrants
- Dedication: St. Michael
- Dedicated: 1991
- Consecrated: 1992

Architecture
- Functional status: Active
- Architect: Zenon Mazurkevich
- Architectural type: Church
- Style: Neo-Byzantine
- Groundbreaking: 1984
- Completed: May 1991

Administration
- Diocese: Ukrainian Catholic Archeparchy of Philadelphia

Clergy
- Bishop: Most Rev. Borys Gudziak
- Priest: Fr. Vasyl Sivinskyy

St. Michael the Archangel Ukrainian Catholic Church is a Ukrainian Catholic church located in Baltimore, Maryland. It was founded to initially serve the needs of the Ukrainian immigrant community in Baltimore.

== History ==
Western Ukrainians (sometimes identified as Ruthenians or Rusyns) began to immigrate to Baltimore in the 1880s and by the 1890s Ukrainian Catholic priests were traveling from Pennsylvania to Baltimore to serve the Ukrainian Catholic community. St. Michael's parish was founded in 1893 and the church was built in 1912. The church population continued to grow throughout the 20th century, causing the church to seek home in a new building in 1981. The church lot was blessed in 1984 and the construction on the parish was completed by September, 1988. Final construction on the church was not completed until May, 1991. The church was dedicated in 1991, consecrated in November, 1992, and the Iconostasis was blessed in June, 1995. The painting of the interior was completed and blessed by Metropolitan Stephen Sulyk in November, 1997. The church was modeled after a design in Kyiv, Ukraine.
