= History of Ukrainians in Baltimore =

The history of Ukrainians in Baltimore dates back to the mid-19th century. Baltimore, Maryland and Washington, D.C. have the largest Ukrainian-American communities in the Mid-Atlantic.

== Demographics ==
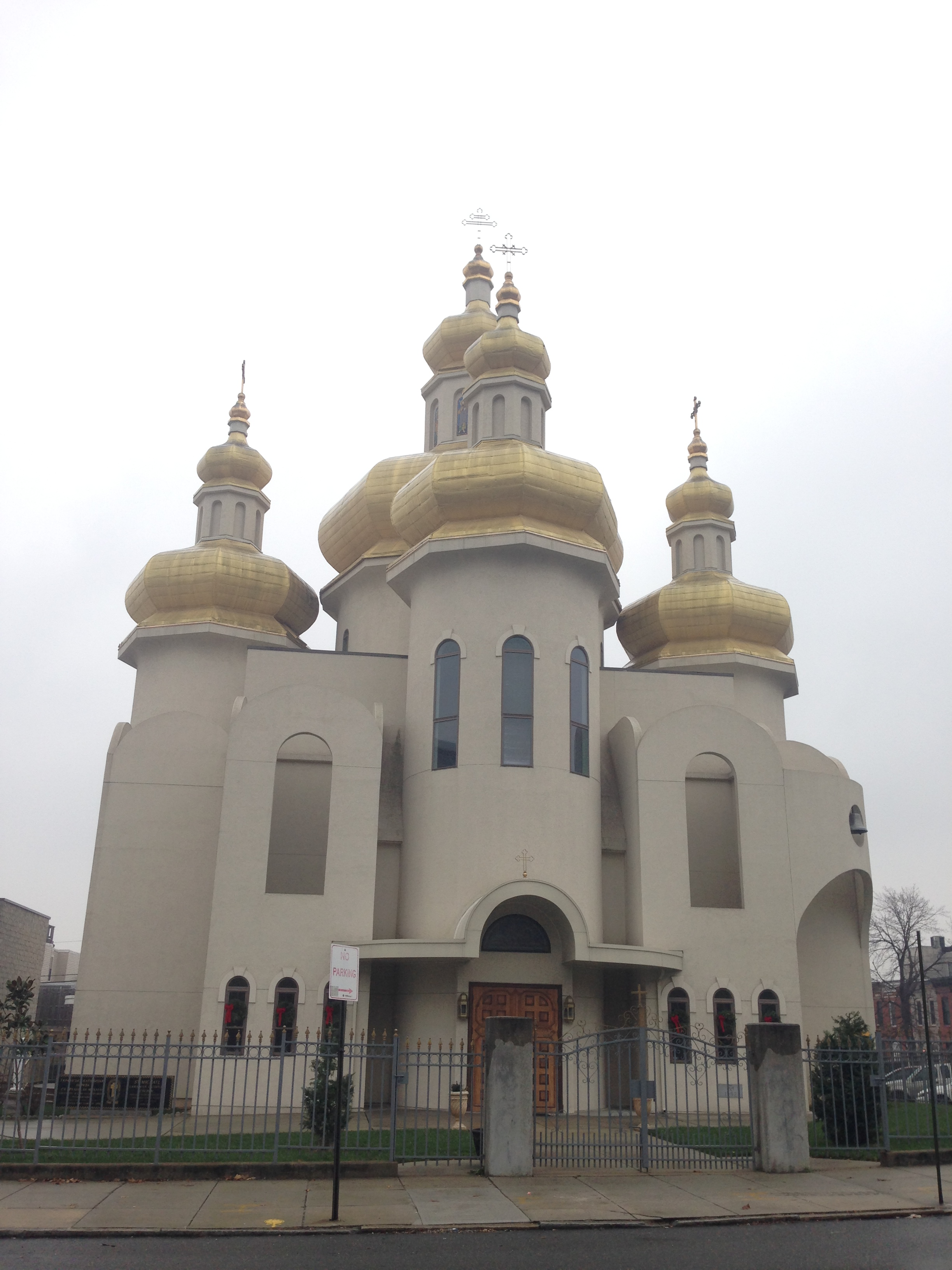
St. Michael's, a Ukrainian Catholic parish in Baltimore, January 2016.

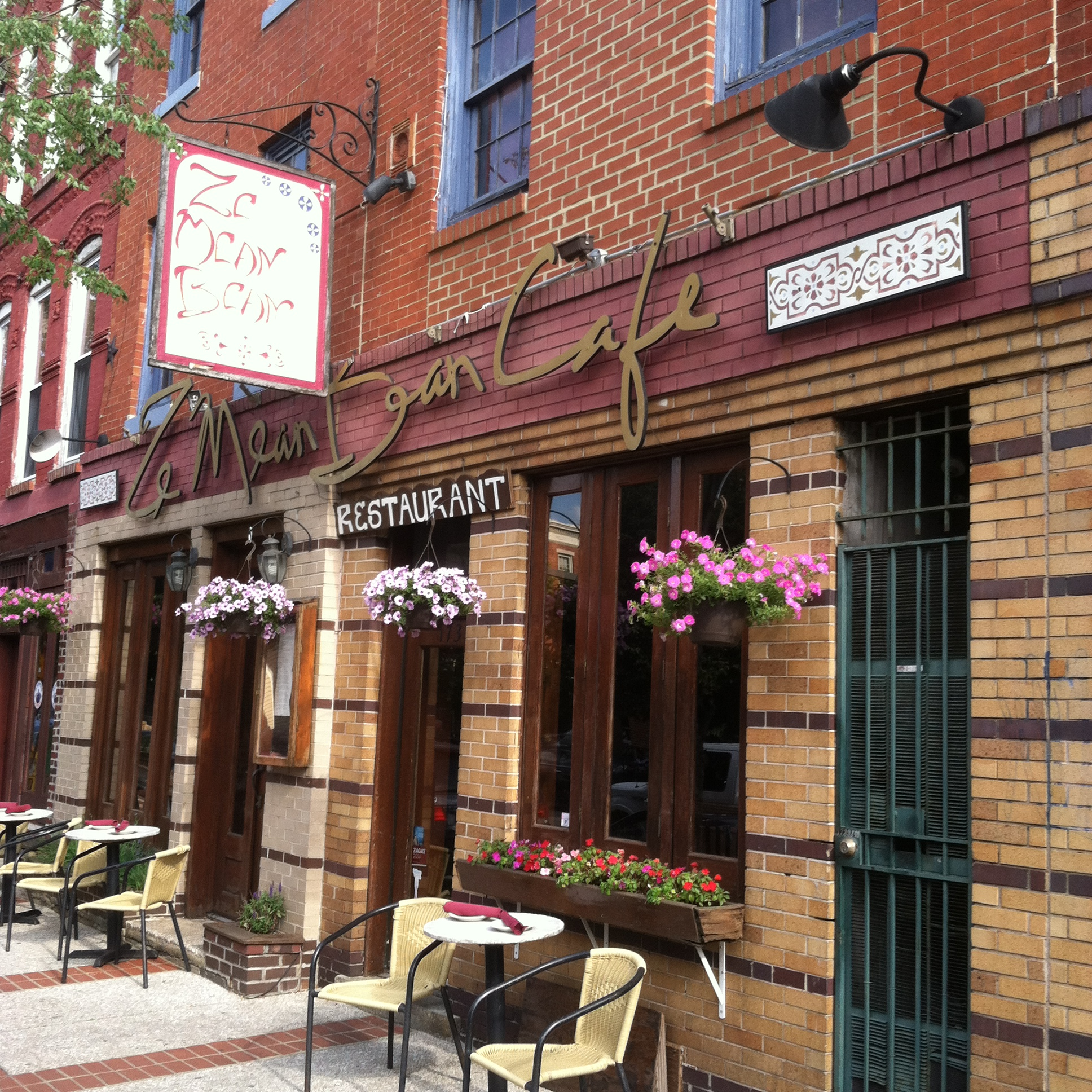
Ze Mean Bean Café, Fell's Point, June 2014.

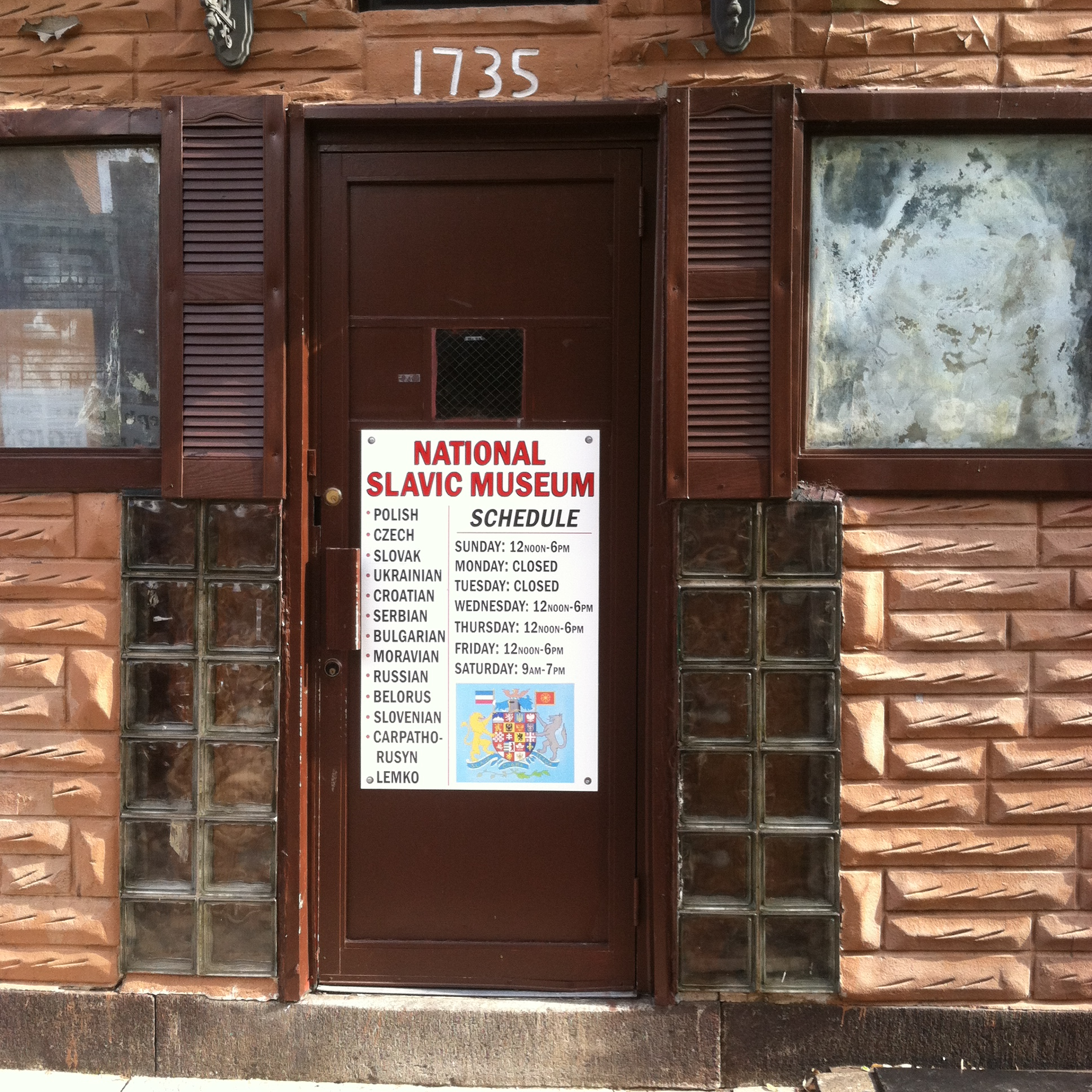
National Slavic Museum in Fell's Point, June 2014.

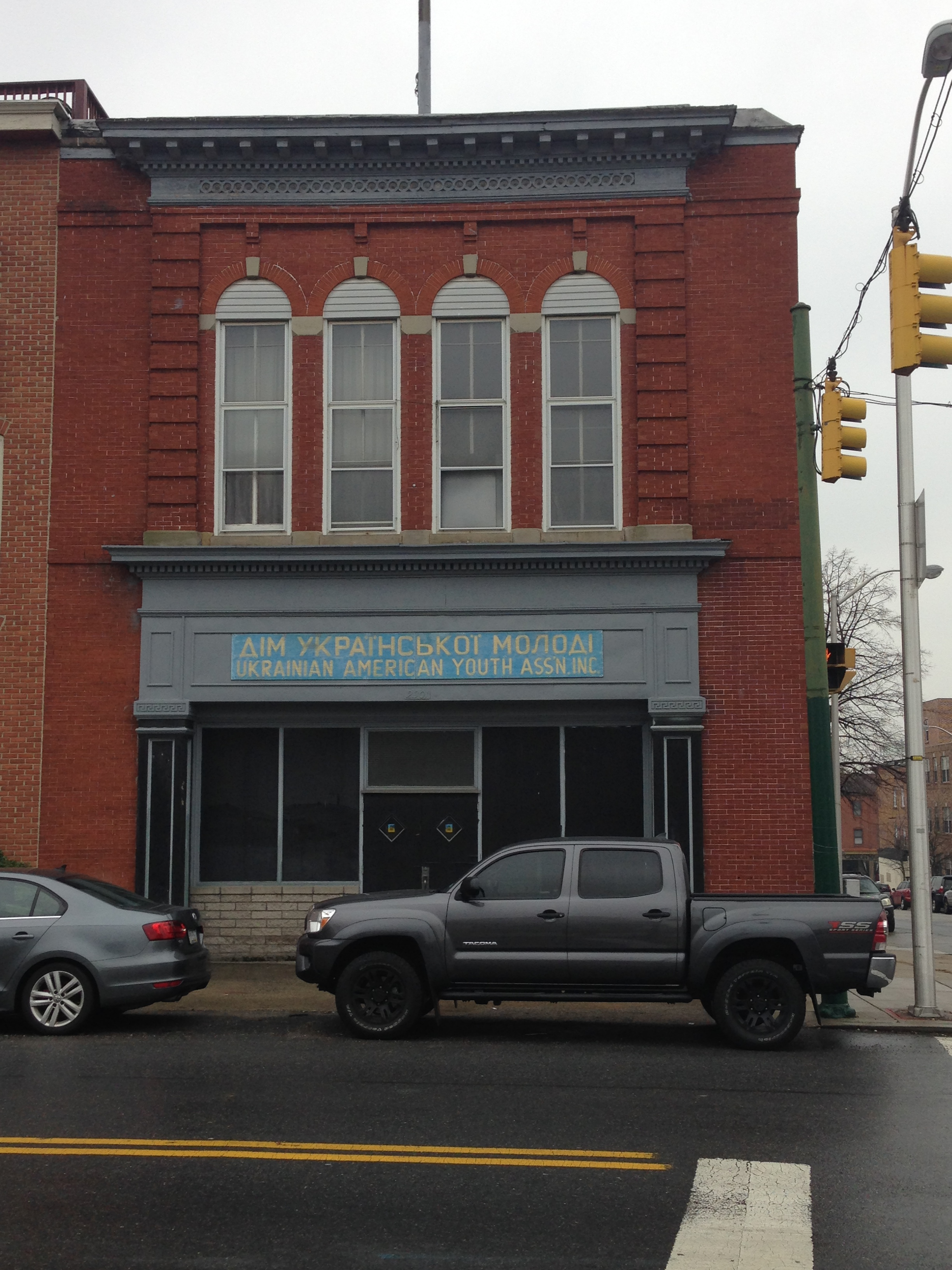
Ukrainian-American Youth Association, Inc. in Patterson Park, January 2016.

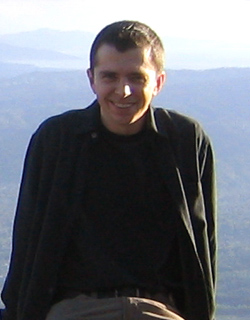
Alexander Onischuk, a chess grandmaster.

The Ukrainian community in the Baltimore metropolitan area numbered 10,806 as of 2000, making up 0.4% of the area's population. In the same year, Baltimore city's Ukrainian population was 1,567, which is 0.2% of the city's population.

In 1920, 151 foreign-born White people in Baltimore spoke the Ukrainian language, then referred to as the Ruthenian language.

In 1940, 14,670 immigrants from the Soviet Union lived in Baltimore, many of whom were of Ukrainian descent. These immigrants comprised 24.1% of the city's foreign-born white population.

In 2013, an estimated 808 Ukrainian-Americans resided in Baltimore city, 0.1% of the population.

As of September 2014, immigrants from Ukraine were the twentieth largest foreign-born population in Baltimore.

== History ==
=== 19th century ===
Ukrainians began settling in Baltimore during the 1880s, mostly in East Baltimore and Southeast Baltimore and especially in the Highlandtown neighborhood. Other Ukrainians settled in Washington Hill and Fell's Point, where there was a Ukrainian store. Most of these immigrants came from Western Ukraine and were Catholic. By the 1890s, Ukrainian Catholic priests were traveling from Pennsylvania to Baltimore to serve the Ukrainian Catholic community. St. Michael the Archangel Ukrainian Catholic Church was founded as a parish in 1893 and the church was built in 1912.

While many immigrants from Western Ukraine identify simply as Ukrainian Americans, others identify as Rusyn American. Rusyns also sometimes describe themselves as Carpatho-Rusyns, Carpatho-Russians or Ruthenians. Some of the Western Ukrainians that established St. Michael the Archangel Ukrainian Catholic Church identified as Rusyns. Rusyns also helped establish Sts. Peter & Paul Ukrainian Catholic Church. Many Rusyn and Western Ukrainians have settled in the neighborhoods of Fell's Point and Patterson Park. Western Ukrainians began immigrating to Baltimore during the 1880s.

=== 20th century ===
During the early 1900s, many Ukrainian immigrants to Baltimore worked for steel- and glass-makers.

From the 1920s to the 1970s, the Ukrainian American Citizen's Club and Ukrainian National Home was the focal point of the Ukrainian-American community in Baltimore. Coalescing as an informal association in the 1920s, the club was legally incorporated in 1931. The club owned a property at 3101 O'Donnell Street, which became the Ukrainian National Home. The home included a school for the Ukrainian language and culture, the Vasile Avramenko School of Ukrainian Dancing, the Ukrainian American Citizen's Club Choir, and a softball team for Ukrainian-Americans. The space was also used by multiple community organizations and after World War II it was used as accommodations for displaced refugees.

By the 1940s, the Ukrainian community in Highlandtown numbered around 1,200.

Many Ukrainians fled to Baltimore from the 1930s to the 1950s in order to escape political persecution, labor camps, the Holodomor famine, or deportation to Siberia. Every year Ukrainian refugees and their children and grandchildren celebrate their good fortune on Thanksgiving Day by giving a toast and playing a game of football in Patterson Park. On 29 May 2008, the city of Baltimore held a candlelight commemoration for the Holodomor at the War Memorial Plaza in front of City Hall. This ceremony was part of the larger international journey of the "International Holodomor Remembrance Torch", which began in Kyiv and made its way through thirty-three countries. Twenty-two other US cities were also visited during the tour. Then-Mayor Sheila Dixon presided over the ceremony and declared 29 May to be "Ukrainian Genocide Remembrance Day in Baltimore". She referred to the Holodomor as "among the worst cases of man's inhumanity towards man".

In 1969, the Ukrainian American Citizen's Club granted usage and maintenance of the Ukrainian National Home to the Dnipro Ukrainian Club.

Beginning in the 1970s, large numbers of Ukrainian Jews immigrated to Baltimore in order to escape antisemitism in the then Soviet Union. In the early 1980s, about 70% of the Soviet Jews in Baltimore had immigrated from the then Ukrainian Soviet Socialist Republic. One-third came from Odesa, Baltimore's sister-city at the time.

Ze Mean Bean Café in Fell's Point opened in 1995. It is a restaurant which offers Ukrainian cuisine, as well as other Slavic and Eastern European fare. The restaurant was founded by Yvonne Dornic as an ode to Ivan Dornic, her Czechoslovak-born Carpatho-Rusyn father.

=== 21st century ===
The National Slavic Museum opened in 2012. The museum focuses on the Slavic history of Baltimore, including Baltimore's Ukrainian history.

In light of the 2014 Ukrainian revolution and the Russian intervention in Crimea, Ukrainians in Baltimore have mobilized to support the pro-Ukrainian cause.

The Lemko House, an apartment complex on South Ann Street, provides housing for Eastern European immigrants. Founded in 1983 by Ivan Dornic, an Eastern Rite priest, the complex is named after Dornic's ethnic group, the Lemkos. The Lemkos are a Rusyn ethnic group inhabiting Lemkivshchyna, a part of Transcarpathia that spans parts of Slovakia, Poland, and Ukraine. Lemko House has opened its doors to low-income residents of any ethnicity, but is still home to many Slavic and Eastern European immigrants.

== Little Ukrainian Village ==
A corridor of Baltimore's Patterson Park neighborhood is referred to by locals as "The Little Ukrainian Village in Baltimore" and "Little Ukraine." The village is home to St. Michael the Archangel Ukrainian Catholic Church and Baltimore's Ukrainian-American festival, as well as organizations for Ukrainians, such as the SelfReliance Baltimore Federal Credit Union, the Ukrainian-American Youth Association, and the Dnipro Ukrainian Club, a sports club and cultural organization.

The Ukrainian Festival was founded in 1976 and is organized by the Baltimore Ukrainian Festival Committee, a non-profit affiliated with the Ukrainian Congress Committee of America (UCCA). The festival lasts two days and features traditional Ukrainian music, dancing, crafts, and cuisine.

== Notable Ukrainian-Americans from Baltimore ==
- Joseph H. Flom, a lawyer and pioneer of mergers and acquisitions.
- Jacob Glushakow, a painter known for his keen observations of life in the city of Baltimore.
- Philip H. Goodman, the 42nd Mayor of the City of Baltimore and a member of the Maryland Senate.
- Joseph Meyerhoff, a businessman, fundraiser, and philanthropist.
- Alexander Onischuk, a chess grandmaster.
- Nikolai Volkoff, a professional wrestler.

== See also ==
- Ukrainian Americans
- History of the Russians in Baltimore
- National Slavic Museum
