= History of Russians in Baltimore =

The history of Russians in Baltimore dates back to the mid-19th century. The Russian community is a growing population and constitutes a major source of new immigrants to the city. Historically the Russian community was centered in East Baltimore, but most Russians now live in Northwest Baltimore's Arlington neighborhood and in Baltimore's suburb of Pikesville.

== Demographics ==
In 1920, 4,632 foreign-born White people in Baltimore were reported as speaking the Russian language as their mother tongue, though the figure probably erroneously included a significant number of Jews whose mother tongue was not Russian. Russian was the second most widely spoken Slavic or Baltic mother tongue of immigrants in the city, after the Polish language.

In the 1930 United States census, Russian-Americans were the largest foreign-born group in Baltimore. In that year 17,500 Russian-born immigrants lived in the city and more than 24,000 Baltimoreans were of Russian parentage.

In 1940, 14,670 immigrants from the Soviet Union lived in Baltimore, many of whom were of Russian descent. These immigrants comprised 24.1% of the city's foreign-born white population.

During the 1990s around 8,208 immigrants settled in Baltimore from Russia, Ukraine, and other countries of the former Soviet Union.

The Russian community in the Baltimore metropolitan area numbered 35,763 as of 2000, making up 1.4% of the area's population. In the same year Baltimore city's Russian population was 5,526, 0.8% of the city's population. 19,430 Russians live in adjacent Baltimore County and in total 7.2% of the Baltimore metropolitan area's foreign-born population is Russian-American.

According to the 2000 Census, the Russian language was spoken at home by 1,235 people in Baltimore.

As of 2005, the Baltimore region had the 15th-largest Russian-speaking population in the United States.

As of 2011, immigrants from Russia were the twenty-sixth largest foreign-born population in Baltimore and the Russian language was the sixth most spoken language among those who spoke English "less than very well".

In 2013, an estimated 5,647 Russian-Americans resided in Baltimore city, 0.9% of the population.

== History ==
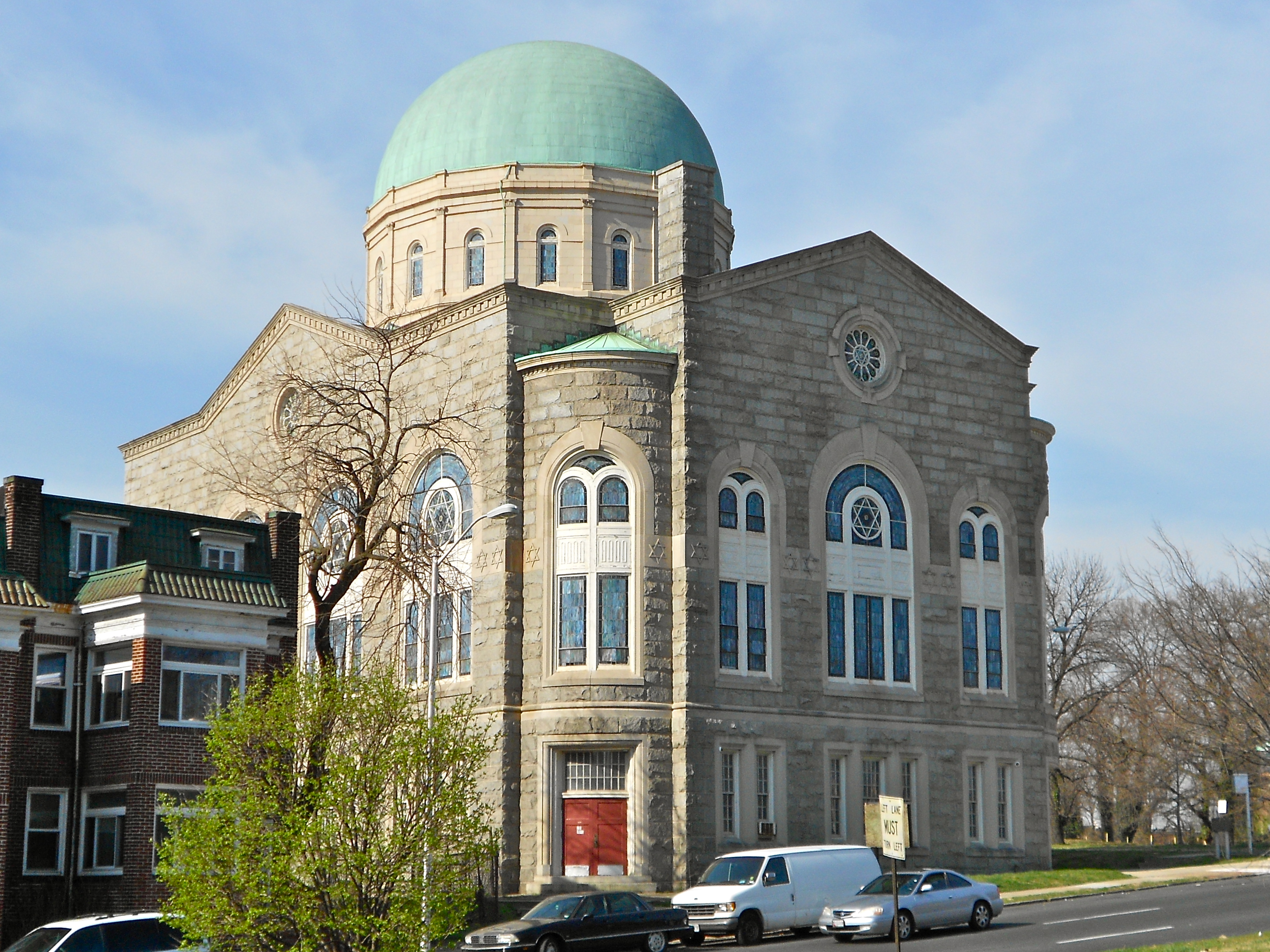
Shaarei Tfiloh Synagogue, in March 2012.

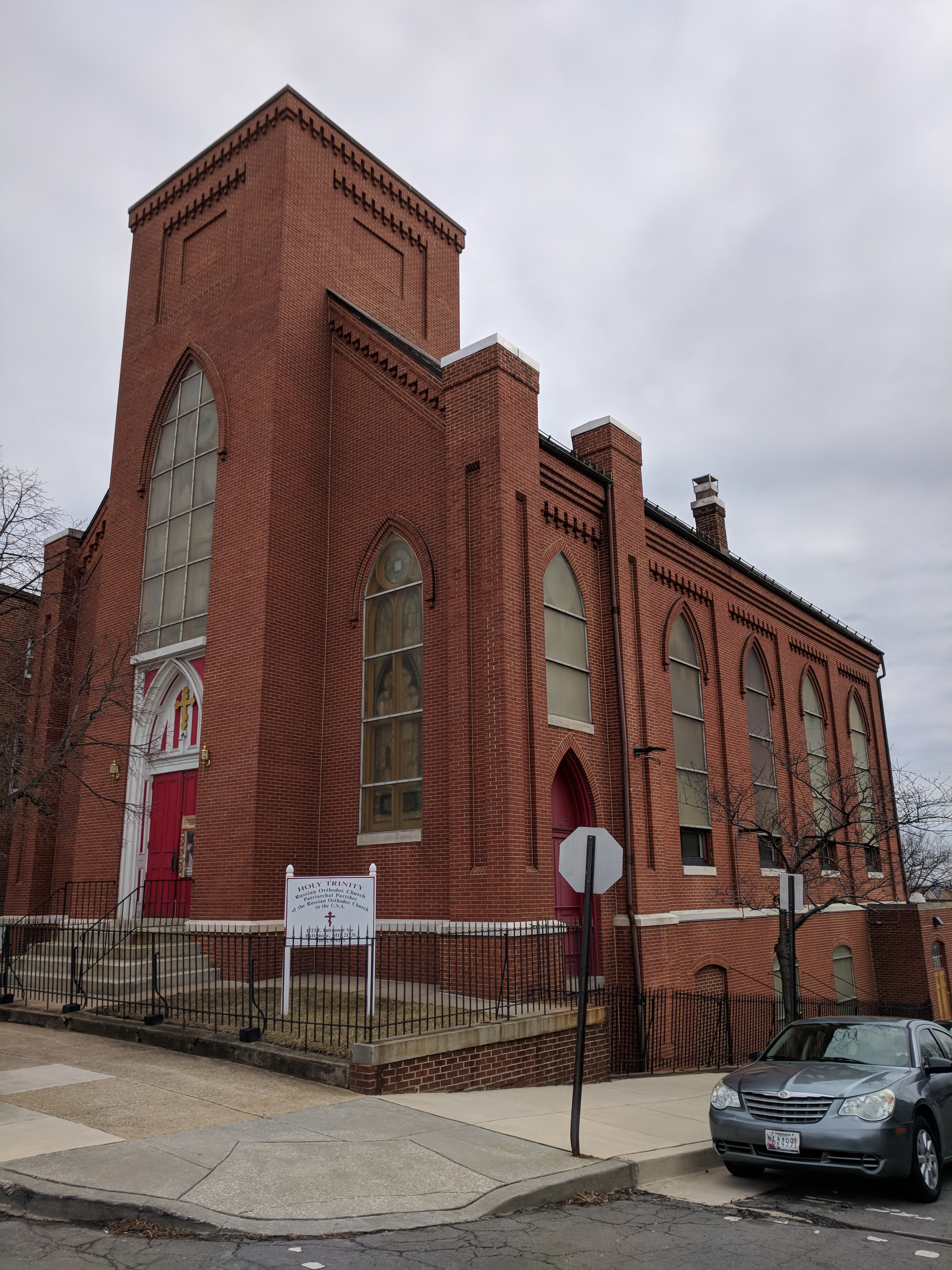
Holy Trinity Russian Orthodox Church, a Russian Orthodox church in Dunbar, Baltimore, February 2018.

Most Russian immigrants to Baltimore have been Russian Jews. In the 1930 United States census there were 17,000 Russians living in the city, most of whom were Jewish. In comparison to Baltimore's wealthy and assimilated German Jews, Russian Jews were largely poor and lived in slums with other Russians. The German-Russian divide among Baltimore's Jewry lead many Jews from Russia to associate more with the Russian community than the wider Jewish community. Baltimore's Russian community, including Russian Jews, was originally centered in Southeast Baltimore. The largest wave of Russian-Jewish immigrants to Baltimore occurred during the 1880s. A second wave of Russian-Jewish immigrants came during the 1990s, following the collapse of the Soviet Union.

During the 1920s, a number of Russians in Baltimore were involved in the Communist Party of Maryland. The Communist Party in Baltimore had a Russian branch. With the approval of the national Russian-language organization of the Communist Party USA, members of Baltimore's Russian Communist branch often attended the Independent Russian Orthodox Church in Baltimore. Prokope Suvorov, the leader of the Russian Communist branch, taught the Russian language at the church. Another Russian Communist staged the congregation's plays, while other members sold Communist literature at the church. The Russian-American Communist Alex Bail was concerned by the religiosity of Baltimore's Russian Christian Communists, but his concerns were somewhat abated due to the portrait of Vladimir Lenin hanging inside the Russian Orthodox church.

During the 1930s, Russians were the largest foreign-born population in Baltimore.

In the 1960 United States census, Russian Jews comprised 18.2% of Baltimore's population. By 1940, Russian Jews were the majority in 13 of Baltimore's census tracts.

Russian Jews helped establish several synagogues in Baltimore, including the B'nai Israel Synagogue and the Shaarei Tfiloh Synagogue.

While most people of Russian descent in Baltimore are Jewish, a significant minority are Christians, mostly from the Russian Orthodox Church. Ethnic Russians from Belarus established the Transfiguration of our Lord Russian Orthodox Church in 1963 in order to serve the needs of the Russian Orthodox community. Russian Orthodox Christians also established the Holy Trinity Russian Orthodox Church.

To facilitate the integration of Russian immigrants into American society, the Baltimore branch of the HIAS established a bilingual Russian-English newspaper titled The News Exchange in May, 1978.

In the 1990 United States census over 30,000 people of Russian descent lived in Baltimore and Baltimore County. At the time, over 400 Russian-speaking people settled in the Baltimore area each year.

Ze Mean Bean Café in Fell's Point opened in 1995. It is a restaurant which offers Russian cuisine, as well as other Slavic and Eastern European fare.

== Culture ==
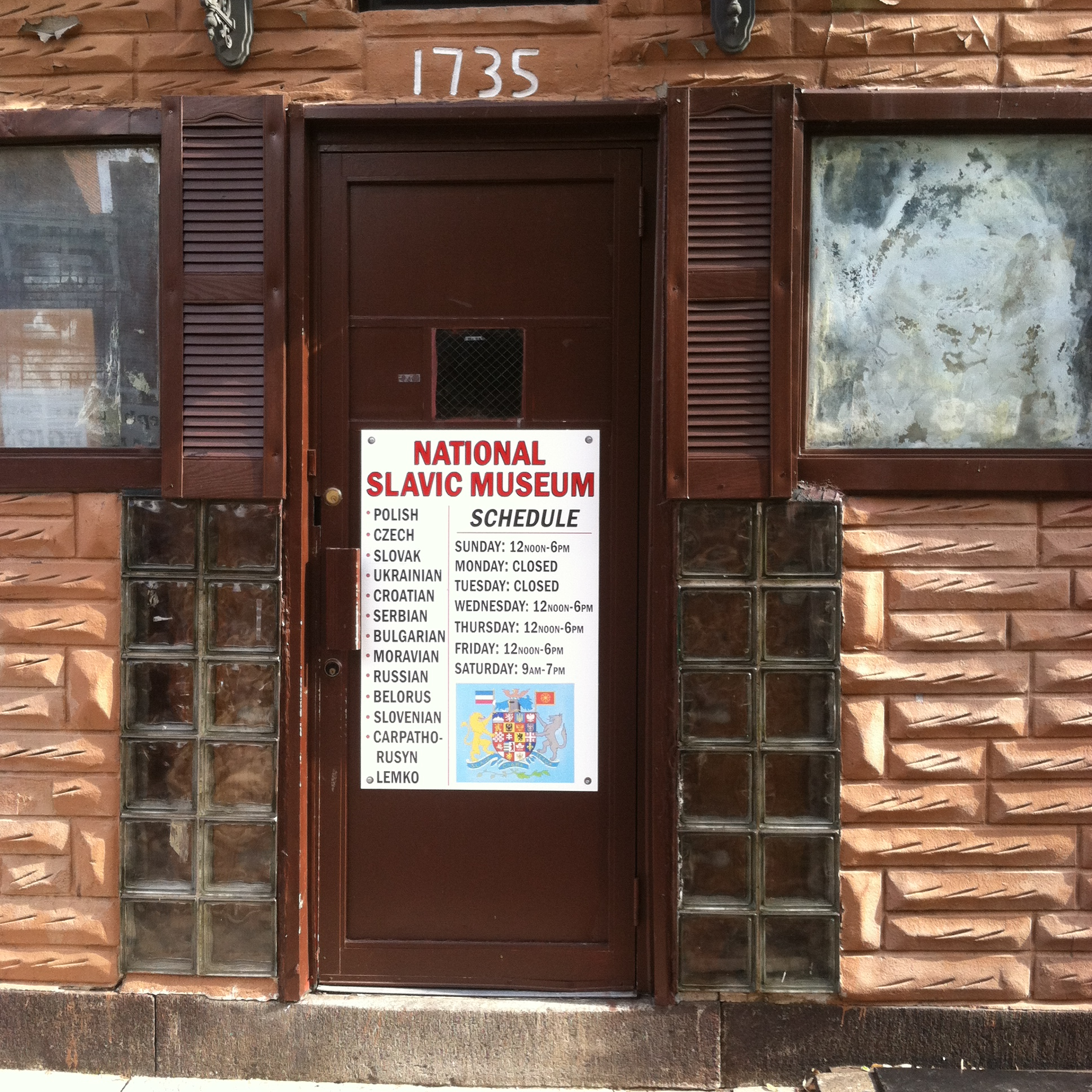
National Slavic Museum in Fell's Point, June 2014.

In 1995 a biweekly Russian language newspaper titled Kaskad (Cascade) was founded by a Russian-speaking Jewish immigrant from Belarus.

As of 1995, the Baltimore area was home to several Russian grocery stores, a Russian language magazine, and a Russian language radio program.

An annual Russian Festival is held at the Holy Trinity Russian Orthodox Church in October. The festival celebrates Russian heritage, history, and cuisine.

The National Slavic Museum opened in 2012. The museum focuses on the Slavic history of Baltimore, including Baltimore's Russian history.

The Lemko House, an apartment complex on South Ann Street, provides housing for Eastern European immigrants. Founded in 1983 by Ivan Dornic, an Eastern Rite priest, the complex is named after Dornic's ethnic group, the Lemkos. The Lemkos are a Rusyn ethnic group inhabiting Lemkivshchyna, a part of Transcarpathia that spans parts of Slovakia, Poland, and Ukraine. Lemko House has opened its doors to low-income residents of any ethnicity, but is still home to many Slavic and Eastern European immigrants, including Russians.

== Notable Russian-Americans from Baltimore ==
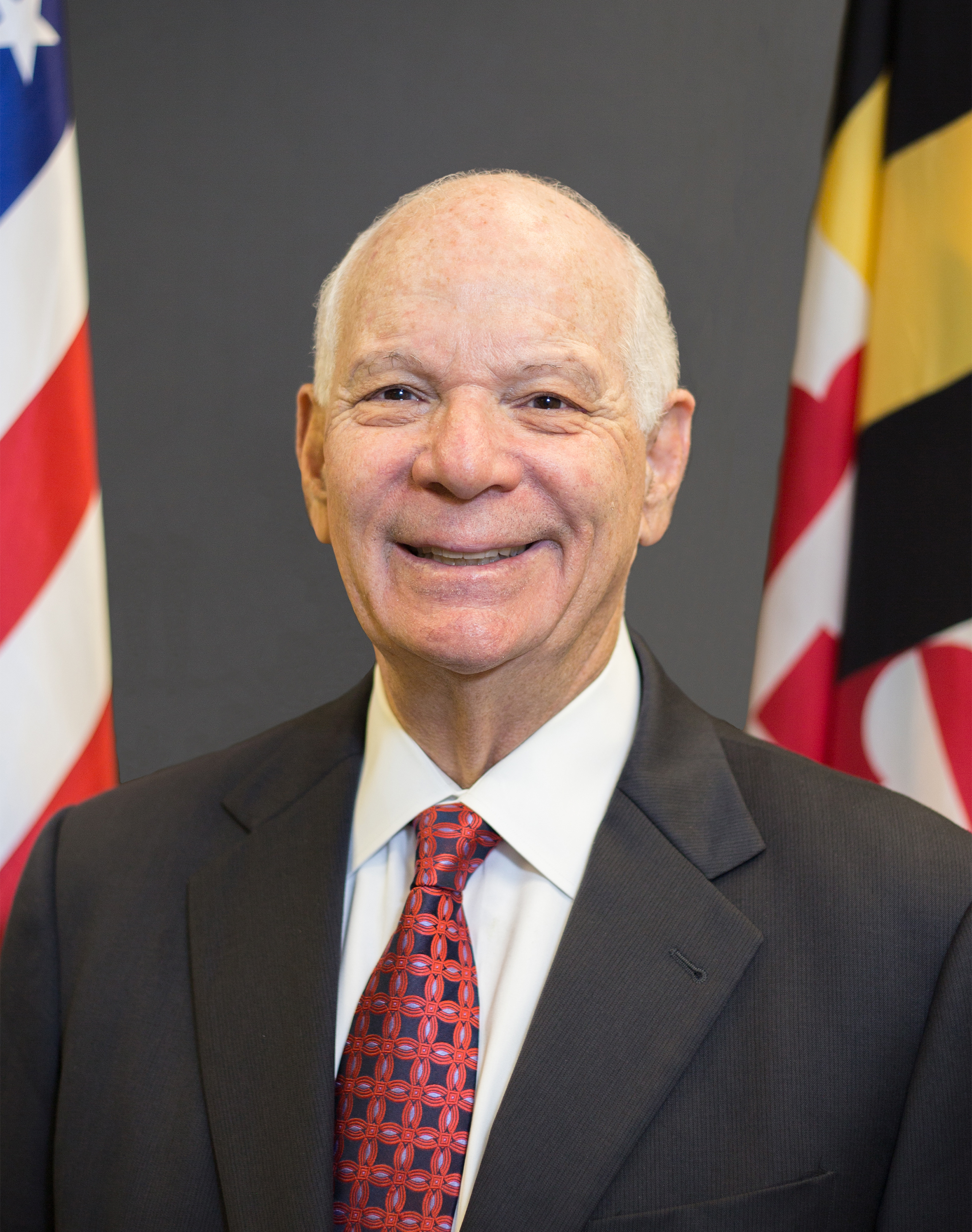
Ben Cardin, a Democratic politician serving as the senior United States senator from Maryland, first elected to that seat in 2006. He previously was the U.S. representative for Maryland's 3rd congressional district from 1987 to 2007, Maryland delegate from 1967 to 1987, and as Speaker of the Maryland House of Delegates from 1979 to 1987.

- Bernard Ades, a Communist lawyer who is most known for his defense of Euel Lee, an African American.
- Ben Cardin, a Democratic politician who serves as the junior United States senator from Maryland in office since 2007.
- Meyer Cardin, a jurist who served as an associate judge on the Supreme Bench of Baltimore City.
- Mary Dobkin, a Russian-born amateur sports coach and advocate for children.
- Cass Elliot (Mama Cass), a singer and member of The Mamas & the Papas.
- Daniel Ellison, a U.S. Representative from Maryland.
- Samuel Friedel, a Democratic Congressman who represented the 7th congressional district of Maryland from January 3, 1953, to January 3, 1971.
- Nick Kisner, Professional Boxer, who has Chechen roots on his mother's side.
- Barry Levinson, a screenwriter, Academy Award-winning film director, actor, and producer of film and television.
- Jessica Long, a United States Paralympic swimmer who is the current world record holder in 10 Paralympic events.
- David Macht, a Pharmacologist and Doctor of Hebrew Literature responsible for many contributions to pharmacology during the first half of the 20th century.
- Tatyana McFadden, a United States Paralympian athlete competing in the category T54.
- Paul Israel Pickman, a film director, screenwriter, producer, newspaper publisher and columnist.
- Steven Posner, a corporate raider who worked together on a number of major hostile takeovers along with his father Victor Posner.
- Victor Posner, a businessman known as one of the highest paid business executives of his generation.
- Carroll Rosenbloom, a businessman who was owner of the Baltimore Colts and the Los Angeles Rams.
- Max Scherr, an underground newspaper editor and publisher known for his iconoclastic 1960s weekly the Berkeley Barb.
- Alan Shulman, a composer and cellist.
- Simon Sobeloff, an attorney and jurist.
- Leon Uris, a novelist known for his historical fiction.

== See also ==
- History of the Jews in Baltimore
- History of Ukrainians in Baltimore
- National Slavic Museum
