= Fells Point =

- Neighborhood of Baltimore
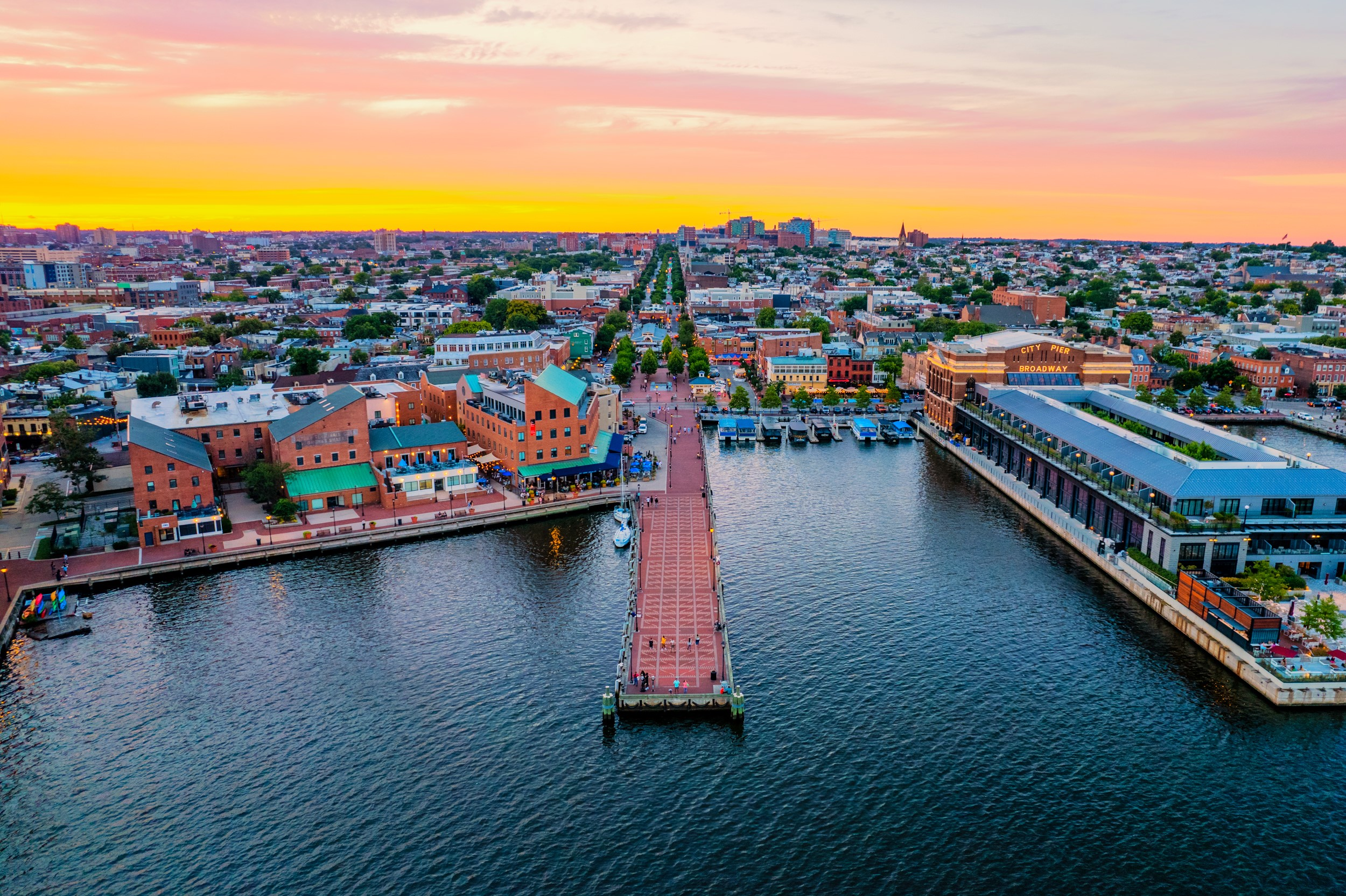
- The Fells Point waterfront at sunset
- Nickname: Fell's/Fells
- Interactive map of Fells Point
- Country: United States
- State: Maryland
- City: Baltimore
- Settled: 1670
- Incorporated: 1729
- Founded: 1732
- Named after: William Fell
- Fells Point Historic District
- U.S. National Register of Historic Places
- U.S. Historic district
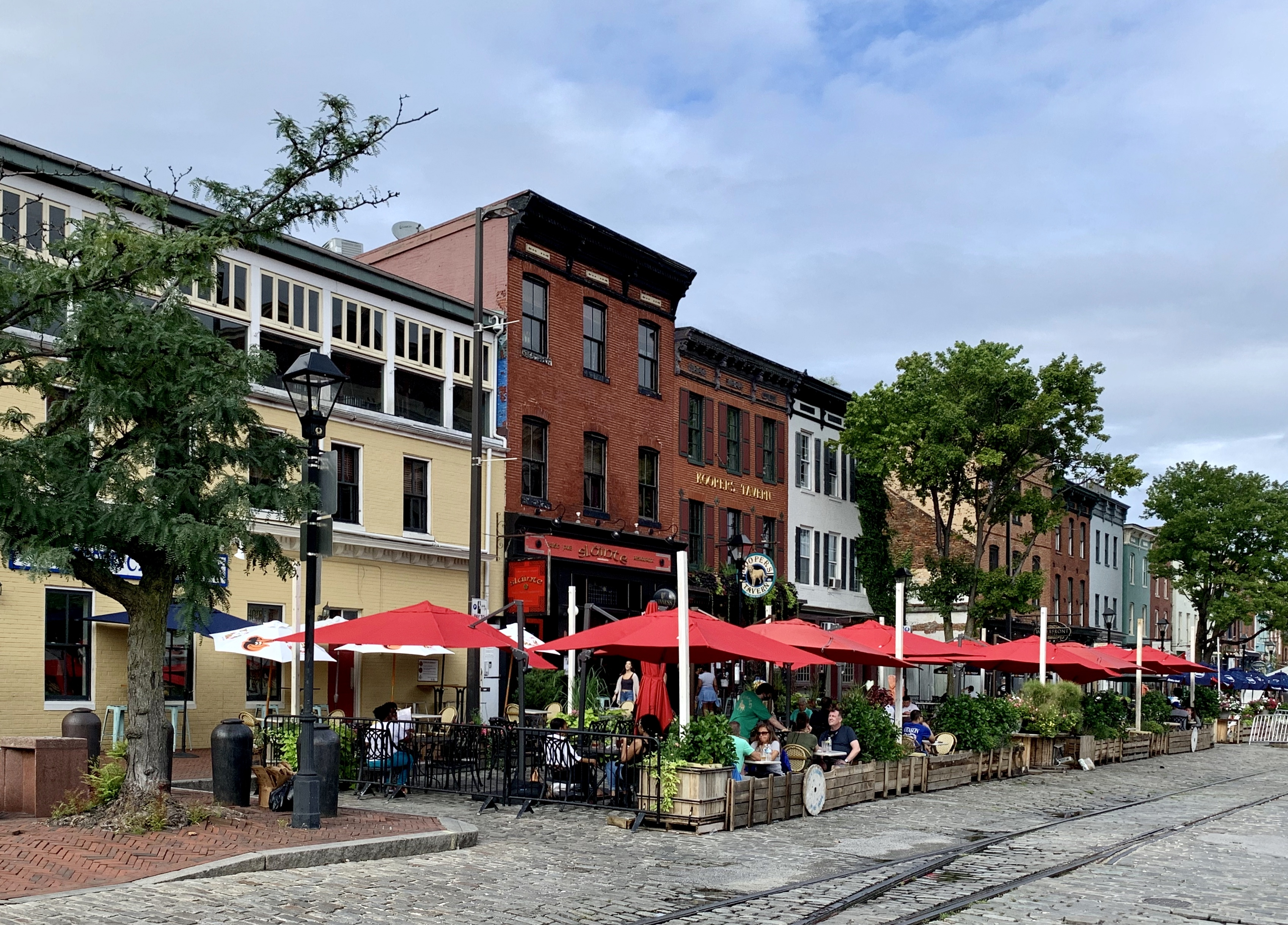
- Storefronts along the Belgian blocks of Thames Street

- Location within Baltimore Location within Maryland Location within the United States
- Location: Bounded on the north by Eastern Avenue, on the east by Chester Street, on the south by the Patapsco River and Harbor, and on the west by Central Avenue; southeastern Baltimore, Maryland
- Coordinates: 39°16′59″N 76°35′34″W
- Area: 75 acres (30 ha)
- Built: 1763
- Architect: Multiple
- Architectural style: Italianate, Greek Revival
- NRHP reference No.: 69000319
- Added to NRHP: March 28, 1969

Fells Point is a historic waterfront neighborhood in southeastern Baltimore, Maryland, established around 1763 along the north shore of the Baltimore Harbor and the Northwest Branch of the Patapsco River. Located 1.5 miles east of Baltimore's downtown central business district, Fells Point is known for its maritime history and character.

The neighborhood has numerous antique, music, and other stores, restaurants, coffee bars, a municipal markethouse with individual stalls, and over 120 pubs.

Across its 250-year history, Fells Point has hosted large immigrant communities, including Irish, Germans, Jews, Poles, Ukrainians, Russians, Czechs, and Slovaks. Since the 1970s, middle- to upper-middle-income residents have increasingly adopted the area, restoring and preserving historic homes and businesses. Sometimes now called "Spanish Town," Upper Fells Point to the north along Broadway has gained a sizable Latino community, primarily Mexican and Central American immigrants, mostly since the 1980s.

This Fells Point waterfront is an upscale residential area and tourist destination featuring first rate hotels and restaurants. A short walk from the Inner Harbor, the neighborhood can be reached by foot, water taxi barges, bus or car. It is one of several areas in and around Baltimore listed on the National Register of Historic Places, (maintained by the National Park Service), the first designated from Maryland, and is one of the first registered historic districts in the United States to combine two separate waterfront communities (along with Federal Hill to the southwest across the Patapsco River and the Harbor on the "Old South Baltimore" peninsula of "Whetstone Point" at Fort McHenry).

== History ==
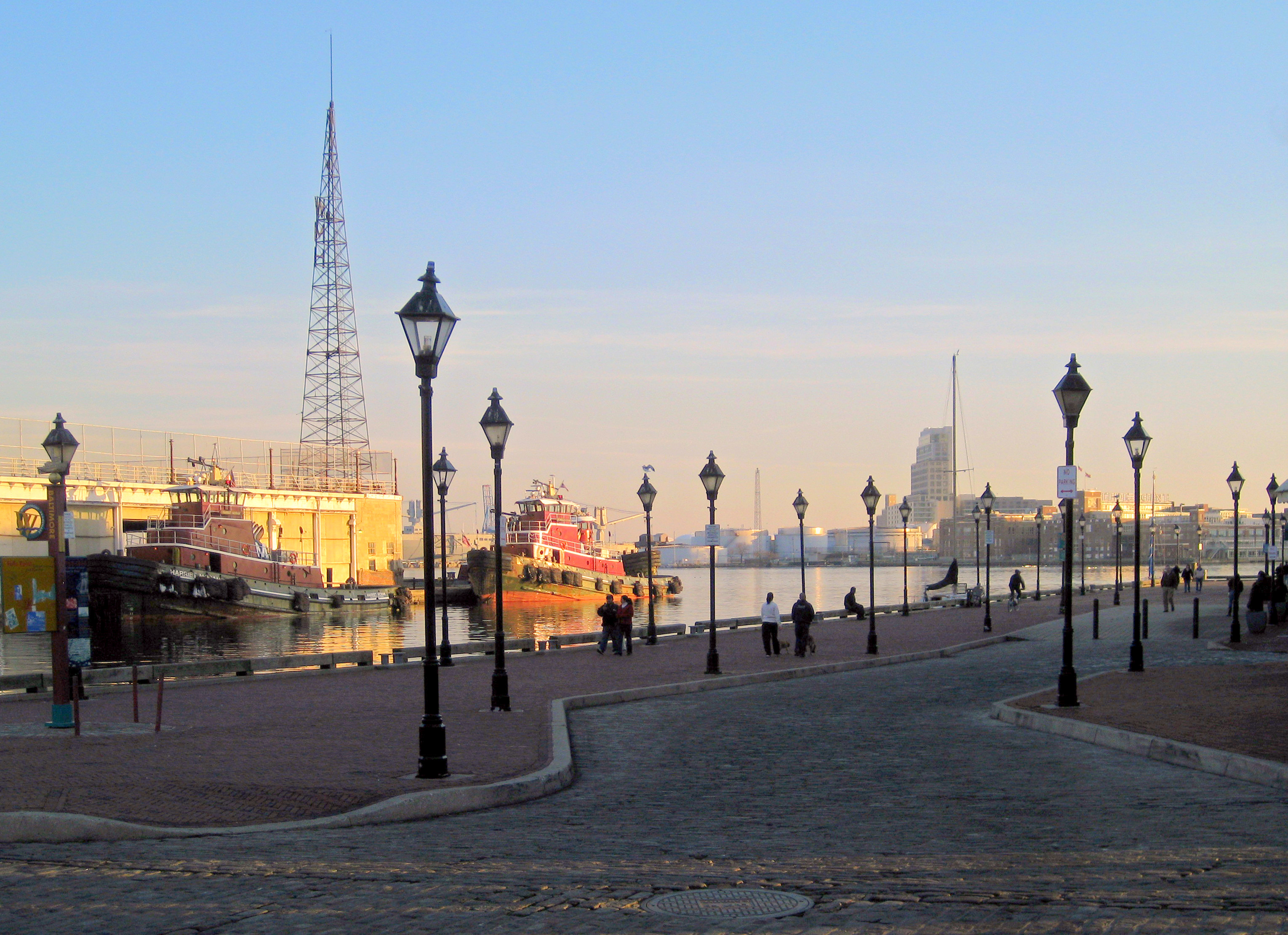
The waterfront of the Northwest Branch of the Patapsco River, the old Basin, at Fells Point

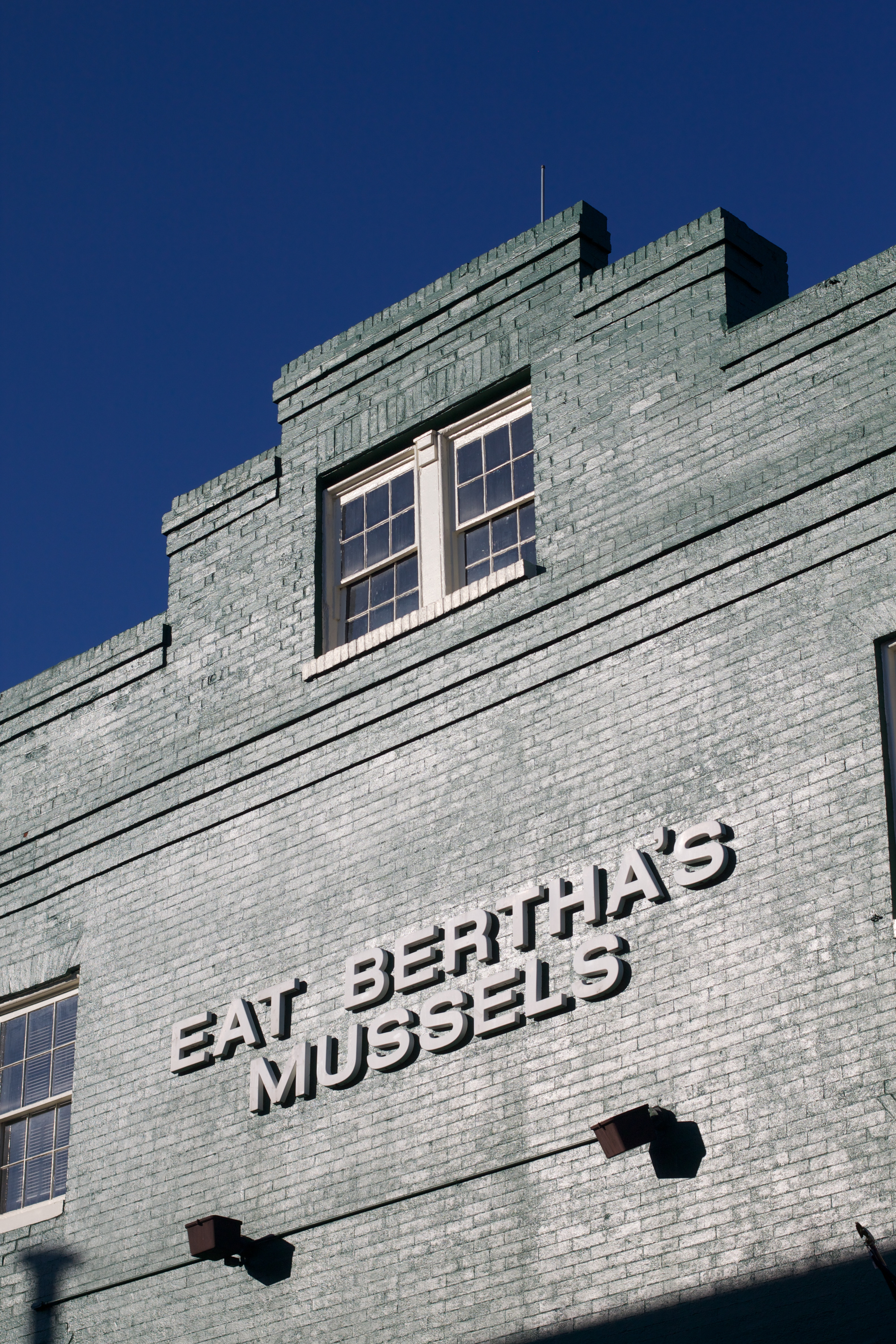
Eat Bertha's Mussels tavern and restaurant in Fells Point

First described by a European seafarer as "Long Island Point" in 1670, the area later to be known as Fells Point was a thin little peninsula jutting out southwestward between the streams of Jones Falls and Harford Run (later covered over by Central Avenue) to the west and Harris Creek to the east (now culverted beneath the community of Canton) and further east to Colgate Creek (now surrounded by the Dundalk and Sea Girt Marine Terminals). Later land was patented with the title of "Copus Harbor". Nearby Baltimore Town to the west at the headwater of the Patapsco River's Northwest Branch was land patented under the name of "Cole's Harbor" and "Todd's Range" to William Cole and later sold to Charles and Daniel Carroll. This area was later established as a "port of entry" by the General Assembly of the Province of Maryland in 1706. After several local farmers and plantation owners originally planning to establish a town on the northeastern shores of the Middle Branch of the Patapsco (also known as "Ridgeley's Cove") were stymied by the objections of local owner William Moale, who thought the land was too valuable as a site of iron ore deposits. So the new town site was moved further to the northeast to the head of the Northwest Branch. Established as a town by the authority of the Colonial Assembly on July 30, 1729, (and signed by Governor Benedict Leonard Calvert on August 8), several streets were laid out in the "Original Survey" of January 12, 1730, with the main one going east-to-west called "Long Street" (later by the 1760s as "Market Street", then renamed East and West Baltimore Streets) and several others intersecting from north-to-south such as Forrest (later Charles), Calvert, running north from "The Basin" (today's Inner Harbor) in 1730.

Joined in 1732, to the northeast along the banks of the stream "Jones Falls" (which originates in northern Baltimore County near the Pennsylvania border) by the laying out of several streets on a northwest to southeast angle by David Jones and named "Jones's Town" with streets such as Front, High, and Low. Founded by William Fell, who was attracted by its deep water and proximity to agriculture and thick forests, Fell's Point became a shipbuilding and commercial center. About 1763, William's son Edward Fell laid out streets and began selling plots for homes. The waterfront village port grew quickly, and eventually incorporated with nearby Baltimore Town to the west and Jones Town to the northwest (which had merged in 1745) in 1773 to form a new Town of Baltimore and later beginning in 1796 and taking effect in January 1797, becoming incorporated by the State of Maryland's act of the General Assembly to become the City of Baltimore (under the title of "the Mayor and City Council of Baltimore").

In 1784, the combined town's market house system was expanded from the original first Centre Market (later known as "Marsh Market") on Market Place (between East Pratt Street to the south and Long Street (later called Market Street, then East Baltimore Street) to the north from 1767. Two additional market areas were established shortly after the end of the American Revolutionary War in 1784. Known first as the "Western Precincts Market" and renamed later as the Lexington Market (by future West Lexington and North Eutaw Streets) on land donated by Continental Army Col. John Eager Howard (1752–1827), an influential Baltimore citizen with a large estate named "Belvidere" surrounding the town to the west and north). To the east borders of the town in that same year was the new "Eastern Precincts Market", also later renamed Fells Point Market or Broadway Market which was located for several blocks length between Fleet Street and Thames Street at the harborside. Later the municipal market system extended to include 12 markets spread throughout the center city by the early 20th century. All became focal point and gathering places for their neighborhoods and attracted customers from the entire city and metropolitan area. The area grew wealthy on the tobacco, flour, and coffee trades overseas through the 18th and 19th centuries.

Fell's Point shipyards became best known for producing topsail schooners, sometimes called "Baltimore clippers", renowned for their great speed and handling. They were excellent blockade runners, and were frequently used as armed privateers. The schooner "Pride of Baltimore II" is based on the "Chasseur", built by Thomas Kemp, which was one of the most successful privateers built in Fell's Point during the War of 1812.

During the War of 1812 (1812–1815), Fells Point's yards built and supported dozens of privateers which preyed on British shipping vessels. Between 1810 and 1815, the yards produced over 150 schooners. Consequently, Baltimore became a principal target of the British during the war, which eventually led to the attack on the city and the bombardment of Fort McHenry in September 1814. Because of this, many people have claimed the British referred to Baltimore as a "nest of pirates", citing Hezekiah Niles' "Niles' Weekly Register", the famous nationally circulated newspaper. However, no such reference has ever been found to support that claim.

It has been an immigrant neighborhood since the 19th century, in part because it was a major point of entry into the United States, but mainly because jobs were available in Baltimore's industries and on the waterfront. In the era before mass transportation, immigrants crowded into the cheap housing near the shipbuilding yards, warehouses and factories of Fells Point. This added to the multicultural fabric of the area, but also caused the more affluent to move into other parts of the city.

In 1835, the later famous abolitionist, writer/author, public speaker/orator, agitator and minister/ambassador Frederick Douglass (1818–1895), while still enslaved, was hired out to the shipbuilder John A. Robb as a caulker at the Fells Point shipyard. In his autobiography, Douglass recounts that, years earlier, the first time he had been sent to Baltimore, the Fells Point neighborhood was where he taught himself to read and write, copying the letters with which the men in the shipyard labeled boards and "making friends of all the little white boys whom I met in the street. As many of these as I could, I converted into teachers."

Fells Point remained a shipbuilding center until the Civil War, when it could no longer handle the larger ships (also now built with steam power and paddle wheels/screw propellers) then coming into use. Likewise, the shipping industry slowly moved away to larger facilities, some of the newer shipyards further downriver with deeper waters close to shore on the outer Patapsco River, and the Fells Point area became a manufacturing center, with innovations in canning, along with nearby Canton to the east, which was an early commercial/industrial and residential development by the Canton Company of the O'Donnell family and Pattersons in the early 1800s. and packing. The neighborhood escaped serious damage during the Great Baltimore Fire of February 1904, which destroyed the downtown financial area further west. Eventually, much of the manufacturing left the city by the 1980s, resulting in urban decay until preservationists in the 1960s, 1970s and late 20th century organized to save the area's historic buildings and neighborhood waterfront fabric along with Federal Hill on the other western side of the newly renamed with proposed redevelopment of the Inner Harbor (formerly called "The Basin") from a proposed East-West Highway of Interstate 95 which was to run north to south down the East Coast states, begun in the mid-1960s.

After World War II (1939/41-1945), many out-migrants from rural Appalachia settled in Fell's Point. In the 1960s, following the civil rights movement, many African Americans settled in the neighborhood.

In 1965, city, state and some federal transit planners proposed to link Interstate 83 (Jones Falls Expressway going north from downtown since 1962), with Interstate 70 (a cross-country highway stretching west to east - from Baltimore to Sacramento, California, but would be designated here as I-70 West) and Interstate 95, (the main East Coast, Maine to Florida super-highway) by building an elevated highway along the north shore of the Baltimore Harbor and Port. This project would have entailed extensive demolition within Fells Point, and across the river in Federal Hill/South Baltimore and the highway would have cut off the remainder of the neighborhood from the waterfront. An "expressway revolt" against the proposals was raised by local residents and derailed the project. Another proposal had I-83 going under the harbor in an alignment that completely avoided Fells Point, but that was scrapped as well. Fells Point's addition to the National Register of Historic Places (supervised by the National Park Service of the United States Department of the Interior) prevented the use of federal funds for the road project, and contributed to the project's cancellation. One of the leaders of the revolt was social worker Barbara Mikulski, who was later elected a City Council member and later a U.S. Representative followed by as a U.S. Senator from Maryland, one of the first women elected to that upper chamber of the United States Congress and by 2014, one of the longest serving when she retired.

Fells Point achieved some fame as the central setting for the 1990s NBC TV network police drama Homicide: Life on the Street, (based on the book Homicide: A Year on the Killing Streets by David Simon of The Baltimore Sun, the city's longtime daily newspaper) and has been the site of many films shot in Baltimore.

Fells Point, located to the east of the Inner Harbor, suffered extensive flooding during Hurricane Isabel in September 2003, with water as high as 10 feet.

== Architecture ==
Fells Point includes a diversity of historic architecture. Flemish bond brickwork is used in some of the earliest homes, while row housing is prominent of nineteenth and early twentieth century construction. Gabled roof buildings and Victorian homes are also interspersed with other housing and use types.

Historic buildings include:

- The Robert Long House, at 812 South Ann Street, built in 1765, is the oldest surviving home in Baltimore.
- Lloyd Street Synagogue, at Lloyd and Watson Streets, in adjacent Jonestown / Old Town neighborhood, an 1845, Greek Revival styled architecture building. Baltimore architects Robert Cary Long, Jr. and William Reasin designed the historic building. It is the third oldest Jewish synagogue building still standing in the United States.
- The Saint Patrick Catholic Church (founded in 1792, current building on Broadway, completed in 1898) one of the first parishes in the Roman Catholic Archdiocese of Baltimore, was unfortunately damaged in the 2011 Virginia earthquake. While the building was condemned and the steeple sustained significant damage, the building reopened for Mass on Ash Wednesday in 2012.

== Awards ==
In 2012, Fells Point was selected by the American Planning Association as one of the Great Places in America (neighborhood category), which "celebrates places of exemplary character, quality, and planning".

== Annual festivals ==
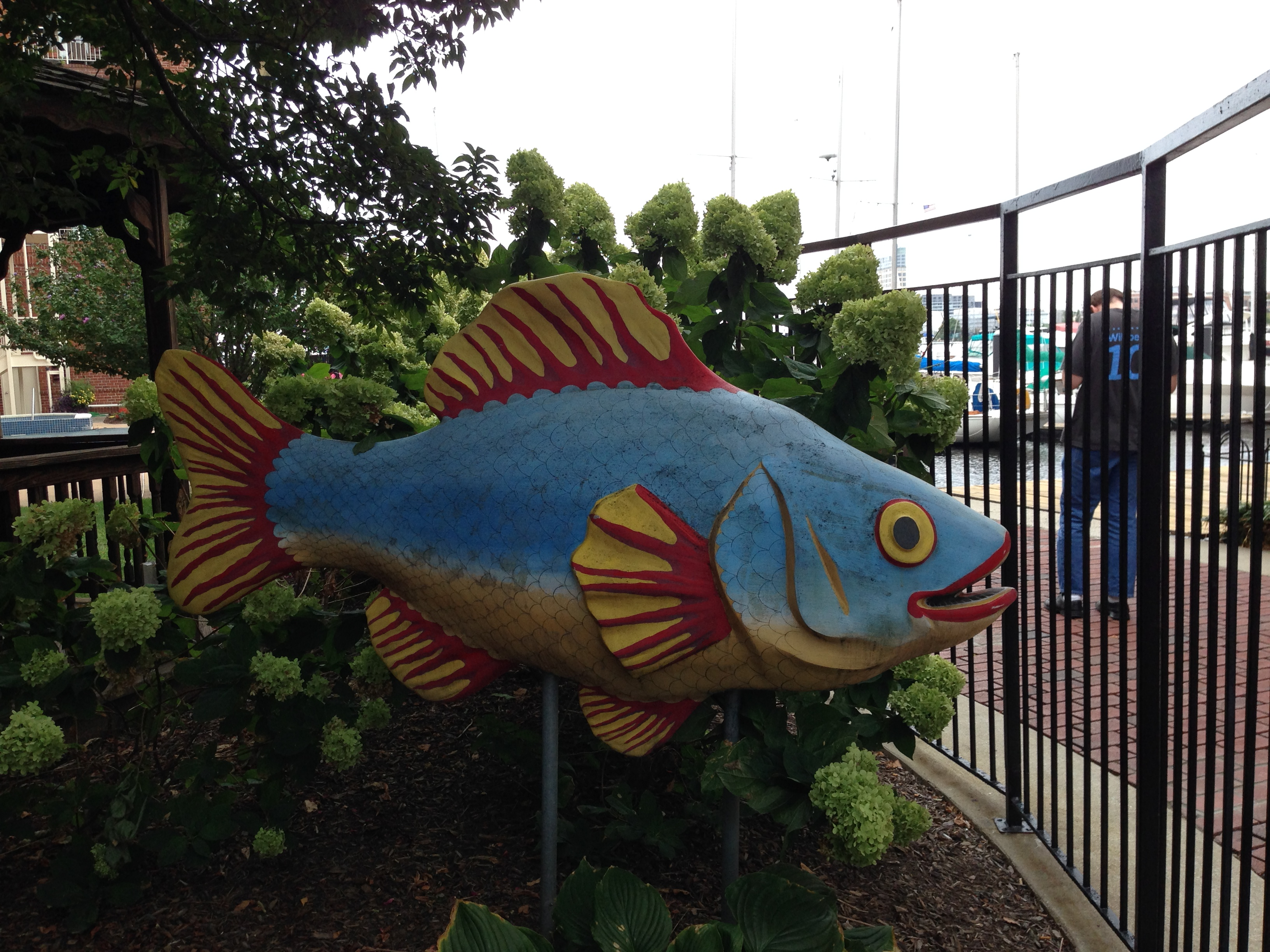
Fish statue in Fells Point

Fell's Point Fun Festival started in 1966 in response to the proposed I-95 freeway that was to run through the neighborhood. The original purpose of the festival was to raise money to help save Fell's Point and to raise awareness of the historical significance of the neighborhood and its plight. The weekend-long Fun Festival, celebrated in October, has an estimated attendance of over 700,000. The event includes entertainment, arts and crafts vendors, and cultural and culinary offerings.

Fell's Point Privateer Festival is an annual weekend-long festival in April celebrating the privateer and maritime history of Fell's Point. Activities include educational demonstrations, a pub crawl, pet costume contest, and pyrate's ball.

Halloween in Fell's Point occurs annually on October 31 celebrating Halloween. The informal gathering takes place in and around Broadway Square and Thames Street. As the evening goes on, hundreds of individuals come dressed in costume and participate in taking photos, trick-or-treating, and pub crawling.

Fell's Point Olde Tyme Christmas Festival is held during the first weekend in December and includes a traditional Christmas market, pet costume contest, and a Reindeer Run pub crawl.

== Demographics ==
At the census of 2010, 3,168 people resided in the neighborhood, 61% white, 24.9% Hispanic, 7.4% African American, and 6.7% other. 37.0% of occupied housing units were owner-occupied, and 17.4% vacant.

83.7% of the working-age population were employed, 4.0% were unemployed, and 13.1% were not in the labor force. 7.5% of families and 12.6% of the population were below the poverty line. The median household income was US$46,167.

== In popular culture ==
Several films and television shows have been filmed in Fell's Point.

- Several scenes in the 2009 movie He's Just Not That Into You were filmed on the Fells Point waterfront.
- David Simon's Homicide: Life On The Street used the former City Rec Pier, now The Sagamore Pendry, as police headquarters throughout the series.
- The 1993 film Sleepless in Seattle had several scenes of 'Annie's house' filmed in Fells Point.

Some fictional works make reference to Fells Point.

- The Doctor Who character Peri Brown portrayed by English actress Nicola Bryant is from Fells Point. This detail was never stated on-screen during the character's original run on the program (1984–1986), but it was included in many book stories and Big Finish audio stories. It was also confirmed in Tales of the Tardis, a spin off marking the 60th anniversary of the program (2023).
- The Baltimore Gun Club featured in Jules Verne's From the Earth to the Moon is located in Fell's Point.

== Notable residents and former residents ==
- Frederick Douglass – abolitionist
- Henry Hochheimer – rabbi
- Billie Holiday – Jazz singer
- Melissa Leo – Academy Award-winning actress
- Edith Massey – actress known for her appearances in films by John Waters
- Michael Phelps – Olympic gold medal-winning swimmer, former resident
